= 2020–21 Arsenal F.C. season =

English football club season

Arsenal F.C.
2020–21 season
- Owner: Kroenke Sports & Entertainment
- Manager: Mikel Arteta
- Stadium: Emirates Stadium
- Premier League: 8th
- FA Cup: Fourth round
- EFL Cup: Quarter-finals
- Community Shield: Winners
- UEFA Europa League: Semi-finals
- Top goalscorer: League: Alexandre Lacazette (13); All: Alexandre Lacazette (17)
Home colours	Away colours	Third colours

The 2020–21 season was Arsenal's 29th season in the Premier League, their 95th consecutive season in the top flight of English football and 104th season in the top flight overall. In addition to the domestic league, Arsenal participated in the FA Cup and EFL Cup. They also participated in the UEFA Europa League for the fourth consecutive year. Arsenal kicked off the season by defeating league champions Liverpool in the FA Community Shield, which ended up being their only trophy.

Managed by Mikel Arteta in his first full season, Arsenal finished eighth in their Premier League season, and following eliminations from the FA Cup, EFL Cup and UEFA Europa League, they failed to qualify for any European competition for the first time since the 1994–95 season.

== Review ==
=== Background ===
Arsenal's 2019–20 campaign had seen defensive frailties and a lack of creativity lead to a disappointing eighth-place finish in the league, the club's lowest for a quarter of a century, but a successful FA Cup run and increasing promise under new coach and former cup-winning captain Mikel Arteta gave them increased optimism for the season ahead. The season had been defined by a three-month lull between March and June, caused by the COVID-19 pandemic; indeed, it was head coach Arteta's positive test that led to the season's pause, and when it returned, it was behind closed doors. The upcoming season was expected to continue in this manner. The league fixtures were released on 20 August, with Arsenal to kick off the new season away at newly promoted Fulham on 12 September. Soon after, the club announced plans to allow fans back into the Emirates Stadium in time for their home encounter with Sheffield United on 3 October.

=== August ===
==== Pre-season ====
The club's first major transfer of the season came on 14 August, with former Chelsea winger Willian signing a three-year contract. He had previously featured 339 times for the Blues over a spell of seven years, scoring 63 goals and winning two Premier League titles, a FA Cup, a League Cup and one UEFA Europa League.

Following the departure of assistant coach and former interim manager Freddie Ljungberg, Arsenal permanently signed January loanees Cédric Soares and Pablo Marí, with the latter arriving for a fee of £7 million. Two days later, following the players' return from a two-week break, Arsenal played their only pre-season friendly, at Stadium MK against League One side Milton Keynes Dons. Mohamed Elneny, Emile Smith Rowe, Daniel Ballard, Tyreece John-Jules, James Olayinka and William Saliba were all making their first appearances back from loan spells elsewhere; Saliba and a host of other youth-teamers made their debuts for the club. Arsenal took an early lead after Elneny took advantage of a poor clearance from goalkeeper Lee Nicholls with a long-range effort. A flowing team move ending with Bukayo Saka setting up Eddie Nketiah for a finish made it 2–0, before Rob Holding's own goal halved the deficit. A header from youth-teamer Mark McGuinness made it 3–1 late on, before Reiss Nelson scored a penalty he himself had won as the match ended 4–1 to Arsenal.

==== Community Shield ====
Arsenal kicked off their season by taking part in the FA Community Shield for the 24th time in their history, against last year's runaway Premier League champions Liverpool. Liverpool initially dominated the contest, but in the 12th minute, Arsenal captain Pierre-Emerick Aubameyang received the ball from youngster Bukayo Saka and then cut away from young Liverpool right-back Neco Williams, before bending a shot into the bottom left-hand corner. Liverpool grew back into the game and equalised late on through Takumi Minamino. The match ended 1–1 and went straight to penalties. Liverpool's Rhian Brewster was the only man to miss as Arsenal clinched their 16th Community Shield, with Aubameyang scoring the winning penalty.

=== September ===
Arsenal's first major action of September was the £23 million signing of Lille centre-back Gabriel, with whom they had been linked for weeks. Gabriel signed after a promising 2019–20 season with the French club, his third total but his first at the Stade Pierre-Mauroy; he had spent the previous two seasons on loan at Avai and Dinamo Zagreb. Less than a week later, the club announced they had re-signed influential central midfielder Dani Ceballos on a second successive loan spell from Real Madrid. Ceballos had made 37 appearances in 2019–20, scoring twice, contributing two assists and providing a strong influence from a deep-lying position.

The Gunners began their Premier League campaign away at Craven Cottage against newly promoted Fulham. Both Brazilian signings, Willian and Gabriel, made their debuts in a comfortable 3–0 win. Alexandre Lacazette opened the scoring in the eighth minute with a left-footed shot after a spill by Fulham goalkeeper Marek Rodák. Willian hit the post with a free kick soon afterwards before delivering an excellent corner four minutes into the second half for Gabriel to nod in for a debut goal. Pierre-Emerick Aubameyang wrapped up the three points with a fantastic strike into the corner to finish of a fine team move, with Willian getting another assist after a fine switched ball.

On 16 September, captain Aubameyang signed a new three-year contract with the club, with reports suggesting his salary was now "in the region of £250,000" a week.

Three days later, the club played their first home match of the season against West Ham United, whom they had last played in their final game before lockdown. The Gunners took a first-half lead after Alexandre Lacazette powerfully headed in Aubameyang's chipped cross — the Frenchman's 50th goal in all competitions for the club — before West Ham levelled through Michail Antonio on the stroke of half-time, after a devastating counter-attack. The Hammers dominated the second period, hitting the bar through Antonio and wasting numerous goalscoring opportunities before Arsenal clinched all three points with five minutes to go as Spaniard Dani Ceballos squared the ball for Eddie Nketiah to tap in the winner.

Arsenal opened their League Cup campaign away at then-league leaders Leicester City at the King Power Stadium. Arsenal had not lost a third-round tie since a 1–2 reverse at home to Southampton in the 2014–15 edition of the competition at the Emirates Stadium. The Gunners comfortably won the tie 2–0; a Christian Fuchs own goal in the 57th minute was followed by a 90th-minute second from Eddie Nketiah to seal the win and a fourth-round tie away to Liverpool for the second consecutive year.

Following the Leicester win, Arsenal faced back-to-back games against league champions Liverpool at Anfield in the space of four days. First, a Premier League encounter with the Reds ended in a 3–1 defeat, the Gunners' first of the season; Alexandre Lacazette opened the scoring for the third successive league match after an error by Andrew Robertson, but Liverpool quickly responded with a Sadio Mané goal before Robertson atoned for his error by flicking the ball past Bernd Leno to give Liverpool the lead. Lacazette failed to convert a one-on-one with Alisson midway through the second half, while substitute and debutant Diogo Jota got on the scoresheet with two minutes remaining to seal a Liverpool victory.

=== October ===
Arsenal quickly avenged their league defeat by narrowly progressing past Liverpool in the third round of the League Cup at Anfield. Two much-changed sides were deadlocked for much of the contest, with both goalkeepers, notably Arsenal's man-of-the-match Bernd Leno, producing a number of terrific stops. The game eventually finished goalless and went to penalties; everybody but Mohamed Elneny and Divock Origi scored, leading to sudden death; after Harry Wilson saw his spot kick saved by Leno, Joe Willock scuffed a shot through the legs of Liverpool goalkeeper Adrián to win the tie for Arsenal 5–4 on penalties. The Gunners progressed to the quarter-finals, where they would face seven-time winners and defending champions Manchester City.

A day later, the draw for the Europa League group stage was made; Arsenal were drawn in Group B alongside Norwegian outfit Molde, Austria's Rapid Wien and Irish champions Dundalk.

Arsenal headed into the international break on the back of yet another win at the Emirates, this time against pointless and goalless Sheffield United; two goals in the space of 190 seconds, first a header from Bukayo Saka and then an accurate finish from substitute Nicolas Pépé just after the hour mark effectively sealed the win, despite Sheffield United getting a late goal back after a fine long-range effort from David McGoldrick for a 2–1 scoreline.

On transfer deadline day, 5 October, Arsenal signed Atlético Madrid's Ghanaian central midfielder Thomas Partey, having paid his £45 million release clause. Two loan departures from the club also occurred: Lucas Torreira went the opposite direction to the Spanish club while Mattéo Guendouzi moved to German club Hertha Berlin. The club announced 55 redundancies related to COVID-19 financial stress, including their mascot, Gunnersaurus. A fundraiser had been set up for Jerry Quy, who had played Gunnersaurus for 27 years, and Mesut Özil offered to pay his salary.

The Gunners returned from the international break with a disappointing 1–0 defeat at Manchester City. They fell behind early to Raheem Sterling's well-taken finish, and failed to really threaten City, despite forcing Ederson into several smart saves and having a penalty waved away for an apparent high foot by Kyle Walker.

On October 20, Arsenal submitted their 25-man squad for the Premier League which excluded Sokratis Papastathopoulos and Özil. This sparked a social media battle between Özil and the club, with the former claiming "loyalty is hard to come by." It is to be believed that Özil will no play for the club again in a competitive match.

The club then played their first-ever game against Austrian side Rapid Wien. Arsenal had so far failed to win a competitive tie in Austria after previous attempts against Sturm Graz in the second round of the 1970–71 Inter-Cities Fairs Cup and against Austria Wien in the first round of the 1991–92 European Cup. They struggled to break down the hosts, and fell behind early in the second half to Taxiarchis Fountas's strike, after Bernd Leno's error. However the Gunners, led by debutant and man-of-the-match Thomas Partey, turned the game around, equalising through David Luiz before winning through substitute Pierre-Emerick Aubameyang's goal sixteen minutes from time.

This victory, however, was quickly followed by a bitterly disappointing 1–0 home defeat to Leicester City in the sixth matchweek of the Premier League. The Gunners were controversially denied an opener with Alexandre Lacazette's fourth-minute header, as VAR (Video Assistant Referee) adjudged Granit Xhaka to have been offside in the build-up to the goal, despite not having clearly interfered with the play. Despite this setback, Arsenal went on to have a strong first half, but faded away in the second half, with only Hector Bellerin's fierce volley on 68 minutes seriously testing the Leicester back line. The Foxes snatched three points and the win late on, with Youri Tielemans's simple ball over the top finding substitute Cengiz Under, who volleyed across to find fellow sub Jamie Vardy, who grabbed the winner by heading in his eleventh goal against the Gunners in all competitions.

A number of fringe players, including debuting goalkeeper Rúnar Alex Rúnarsson, played as the Gunners continued their perfect Europa League start by cruising past Irish side Dundalk 3–0. In their first-ever game against Irish opposition, they struggled to break down the visitors, until a misjudgement by 39-year old goalkeeper Gary Rogers just before half-time gifted Eddie Nketiah his tenth goal for Arsenal in all competitions. Joe Willock fired in a second minutes later, before Nicolas Pépé bent a terrific right-footed shot into the top corner for his tenth goal for Arsenal in all competitions as well. Late in the second half, Folarin Balogun made his debut as a substitute as the match ended in a comfortable victory.

=== November ===
On 1 November, Arsenal headed away to Old Trafford to take on traditional rivals Manchester United. In the first half, neither team was able to score, although after a couple half-chances Willian and Bukayo Saka came the closest to scoring; the former hit the crossbar in the 39th minute, and the latter headed unchallenged over the bar just before halftime. In the 68th minute, Paul Pogba clipped the ankle of Héctor Bellerín as the Spaniard tried to collect a pass from Willian just inside the box, and referee Mike Dean awarded the penalty. Captain Pierre-Emerick Aubameyang successfully converted the penalty for his second Premier League goal of the season and his first since the season opener at Fulham by slotting the ball into the bottom right corner of the goal as David de Gea dived in the other direction. The Gunners were able to successfully defend their narrow lead and earn their first away win against another "Big Six" team in almost five years; the last such victory came at the City of Manchester Stadium against Manchester City on 18 January 2015, which Arsenal won 2–0. The victory was also Arsenal's first away win against Manchester United since 17 September 2006, which was also a 1–0 affair.

The Gunners followed up the Old Trafford match with a first ever competitive meeting with Molde FK at the Emirates Stadium, securing a third consecutive win in all competitions via a 4–1 scoreline. They were, however, made to work for it, as they fell behind to Martin Ellingsen's well-taken strike halfway through the first half. Two Molde own goals from Kristoffer Haugen before half time and substitute Sheriff Sinyan just after the hour mark put Arsenal into the lead, before two well-taken late goals from Nicolas Pépé and Joe Willock padded the Gunners' lead.

The month ended with the FA Cup third-round draw, in which the holders Arsenal would start their title defence at home to Newcastle United.

The run of good form was ended when the Gunners lost at home to Aston Villa 3–0, marking the fourth time in the past five seasons that Arsenal had been beaten by three or more goals at the Emirates Stadium. Villa took the lead when a well-worked move involving Jack Grealish, Ross Barkley and Trezeguet ended with the lattermost's cross being turned in for an own goal by Bukayo Saka. Another great move ended with Barkley volleying the ball across the goal to Ollie Watkins, who had scored a hat-trick in the Villans' 7–2 win over defending champions Liverpool the previous month, to head in. A swift counterattack three minutes later ended in Watkins' second and Villa's third to seal the result of the game.

Mohamed Elneny and Sead Kolašinac both tested positive for COVID-19 on international duty for Egypt and Bosnia and Herzegovina respectively, and a thigh injury to Thomas Partey against Villa left the Gunners weakened upon their trip to Elland Road to face Leeds United. The first half was dull and goalless, but early in the second half, a headbutt on Ezgjan Alioski earned Nicolas Pépé a red card. From there, Leeds dominated, forcing Bernd Leno into several saves despite wasting numerous chances, including hitting the woodwork three times. However, Arsenal managed to hold on for a 0–0 draw.

The Gunners then made the trip to Norway to take on Molde again in the Europa League group stage. Once more, they started uncertainly, with Sheriff Sinyan, scorer of the second own goal in the first match between the two sides, missing an open goal in an attempt to redeem himself. At half time, it was 0–0, but once again the Gunners came back with three second half goals. After Nicolas Pépé hit the crossbar with a fine curling effort on 48 minutes, the Ivorian atoned for his red card at Elland Road by firing in Joe Willock's overhit cross, before an Eddie Nketiah goal was ruled out for offside. A fine, flowing team move ended with Reiss Nelson tapping in fellow academy graduate Willock's low cross for the second goal five minutes later. Late in the second half, Folarin Balogun, on just his second senior appearance, scored within 30 seconds of coming as a substitute. He received the ball from fellow substitute and academy graduate Emile Smith Rowe and swivelled before beating goalkeeper Andreas Linde from close range to wrap up a comfortable 3–0 win and book their places in the knockout stages with two games to go.

The side then returned to Premier League action in a crucial home encounter with Wolverhampton Wanderers. As David Luiz and Wolves striker Raúl Jiménez battled for a cross from Willian in the fifth minute, a clash of heads between the two resulted in a stoppage of play. Jiménez suffered a serious head injury that forced him to be stretchered off, while Luiz received on-field treatment and had to be bandaged for a head wound; the latter was eventually taken off at half time out of caution. Wolves nonetheless took the lead through Pedro Neto on 27 minutes after Leander Dendoncker's header rebounded off the crossbar. However, just three minutes later, a short, well-worked corner saw Willian find the head of fellow Brazilian Gabriel to power home. It was the Gunners' first goal in open play in the Premier League since 4 October against Sheffield United, but despite having several other great chances, they fell to a third home league defeat in a row after Daniel Podence smartly finished before the break.

=== December ===
The Christmas period began with the return of fans to the Emirates Stadium for the first time in nine months as Arsenal took on Rapid Wien in the fifth Europa League group stage game. A stunning long-range goal from Alexandre Lacazette gave the Gunners an early lead, which they added to with Pablo Marí's first goal for the club in just his fourth appearance, after a long-term ankle injury sustained in June. A fine passing move just before half-time culminated in Eddie Nketiah being denied from close-range by goalkeeper Richard Strebinger before heading in the rebound. Just after half-time, striker Koya Kitagawa pulled one back for the visitors before substitute Emile Smith Rowe capped off a dominant display with his first goal of the season on just his second appearance (both as a substitute) to cap off a 4–1 victory for Arsenal.

Once again, Arsenal failed to take their terrific European form into their domestic games. This time, Mikel Arteta's side fell to another disappointing defeat, their fifth in seven league games, in the North London derby against Tottenham Hotspur. Tottenham capitalized on individual defensive errors with first-half goals from Son Heung-min and Harry Kane on counterattacks to condemn the Gunners to a 2–0 defeat. Arsenal failed to be clinical having numerous half-chances as the side registered just two shots on target to Spurs' three. Spurs went top of the league after the win, while Arsenal slumped to 15th.

Arsenal recovered by completing a perfect European group stage for the first time in the club's history when they beat Dundalk 4–2 in the Aviva Stadium in Dublin as their first-ever club game in the Republic of Ireland ended in a success. Eddie Nketiah scored his fifth goal of the season, Mohamed Elneny got his first goal in nearly three years, Joe Willock scored his third of the campaign, and Folarin Balogun contributed with a goal and an assist after coming on as a substitute.

Against Burnley on 13 December at home, a red card for Granit Xhaka and an own goal by club captain Pierre-Emerick Aubameyang sealed a win for the visitors.

Pierre-Emerick Aubameyang ended his five-game goal drought with a second-half equaliser in a 1–1 home draw with Southampton, cancelling out former Arsenal player Theo Walcott's goal on his Emirates Stadium homecoming. There were more disciplinary problems as Gabriel was sent off for two yellow cards in a span of four minutes.

Aubameyang picked up a calf injury which kept him out of the starting lineup of the 2–1 Premier League defeat at Goodison Park against Everton. A Rob Holding own goal and a Yerry Mina header on either side of Nicolas Pépé's converted penalty before half-time gave the Toffees the win, with David Luiz coming closest for Arsenal in the second half when he hit the post with a well-struck half-volley.

This was followed by a bitterly disappointing performance against Manchester City at the Emirates Stadium in the League Cup quarter-finals. Gabriel Jesus scored for City inside two minutes and although Alexandre Lacazette equalised against the run of play, second-half goals from Riyad Mahrez, Phil Foden and Aymeric Laporte gave City a comfortable 4–1 win, as Arsenal's League Cup run came to an end in the quarter-finals for the second time in three years.

However, this was followed by a spectacular win over Chelsea at home in the Premier League, Arsenal's first in nearly two months. Aubameyang was still struggling with a calf injury as Mikel Arteta reshuffled his side, giving starts to youngsters Gabriel Martinelli and Emile Smith Rowe, with Pablo Marí making his first league appearance and start of the season and Granit Xhaka returning from his suspension. In the thirty-third minute, the Swiss midfielder found Kieran Tierney with a floated pass to the left side of the field. Tierney cut inside past Chelsea right back Reece James, who clipped the Scotsman's ankles inside the box. Referee Michael Oliver immediately awarded the penalty, which Alexandre Lacazette converted past Édouard Mendy. Before halftime, Xhaka scored a spectacular free kick to increase Arsenal's lead. In the second half, Arsenal continued to add to their lead. After receiving a pass from Smith Rowe, Bukayo Saka seemed to attempt a cross to the far post, but his errant pass managed to chip Mendy and find the top corner. Arsenal nearly managed to add a fourth when a Saka corner in the eighty-fourth minute fell to Mohamed Elneny on the edge of the box, but the Egyptian's half-volley rattled off the crossbar. Less than two minutes later, a cross from Callum Hudson-Odoi was chested in by Tammy Abraham, which, after VAR ruled it to be correctly onside, made the score 3–1. In stoppage time, Pablo Marí conceded a late penalty when he clipped Mason Mount in the box, giving Chelsea the opportunity to halve the deficit. However, Jorginho, a second-half substitute, had his spot kick saved by Bernd Leno to cap off a 3–1 victory for the Gunners.

A hard-fought 1–0 win away to Brighton at the Amex Stadium, the first time since September that Arsenal won consecutive league fixtures, saw Arsenal rise to thirteenth after spending the previous five matchweeks at fifteenth place. After a run by Bukayo Saka down the left in the sixty-sixth minute, the youngster found Alexandre Lacazette, who scored just 29 seconds after coming on in the 66th minute. Despite Saka limping off later with an injury, the three points ensured Arsenal ended 2020 on a high.

=== January ===
Arsenal hoped to win their third straight league game in a row and started off 2021 away to West Brom at The Hawthorns, who had conceded thirteen goals in their previous three league games. A snowstorm before and during the game made for less-than-ideal conditions, but Arsenal were on the front foot from the start, and a cross from Bukayo Saka to the back post proved to be just too far for captain Pierre-Emerick Aubameyang in the fifteenth minute. Arsenal opened the scoring in the twenty-third minute when Kieran Tierney ran in from the left past Darnell Furlong and curled in a shot past Sam Johnstone. Five minutes later, Alexandre Lacazette passed out to Emile Smith Rowe on the right side of the box, who found the onrushing Saka, who in turn tapped in Arsenal's second goal of the game. In the closing minutes of the first half, Héctor Bellerín received a yellow card for a late tackle on Conor Gallagher; this was the Spaniard's sixth yellow card of the season and a league-leading mark at the time. Two minutes into the second half, West Brom came the closest they were to scoring all game when winger Matheus Pereira's shot across goal hit the far post and Callum Robinson put in the rebound from just outside of the box for West Brom, but the goal was ruled out due to Pereira being offside. An early second-half substitution saw Ainsley Maitland-Niles replace Bellerín at right back, so as to avoid the danger of the Spaniard receiving a second yellow and a subsequent red card and suspension. In the sixtieth minute, Arsenal continued to pad their lead. A cross from Saka from the right was nearly put in by West Brom defender Semi Ajayi, who hit the post. The rebound fell to Smith Rowe, whose shot was parried away by Johnstone but fell to Lacazette, who slotted in the third Gunners goal of the game. The French striker added a fourth goal and his second of the game minutes later after connecting with a Tierney cross a few yards in front of the goal. The score remained the same and the game finished 4–0. Along with the Gunners' third win in a row, this was the second consecutive clean sheet for Bernd Leno and the first time all season that Leno has had consecutive clean sheets in the Premier League. With the win, Arsenal moved up to eleventh and their goal difference became positive for the first time since early November.

Arsenal began their FA Cup defense in the third round against fellow Premier League side Newcastle United at home on 9 January. At halftime, the score was 0–0, as neither side was able to break the deadlock, though Arsenal had more of the chances. In the second half, Joe Willock's header in the sixty-fifth minute and Newcastle striker Andy Carroll's strike in second half stoppage time, both of which forced close-range saves out of Martin Dúbravka and Bernd Leno, respectively, represented each team's best opportunity to score. In the final moments of the second half, referee Chris Kavanagh sent off Emile Smith Rowe with a straight red card for a foul on Sean Longstaff, but after VAR review, the red card was downgraded to a yellow. In the first half of extra time, despite Arsenal continuing to dominate the chances, they were unable to score; Granit Xhaka's volley from outside the box was tipped over the crossbar by Dúbravka, while a potential penalty was dismissed by Kavanagh and VAR when Matt Ritchie tripped Pierre-Emerick Aubameyang as the latter attempted to dribble past the former into the box. Smith Rowe was able to redeem himself early in the second half of extra time as he chested down a pass from Alexandre Lacazette before firing a shot from a tight angle across the goal and off the near post to put Arsenal ahead. A few minutes later, Aubameyang sealed the win for the Gunners when he tapped in a low cross from Kieran Tierney. With the 2–0 win, Arsenal advanced to the fourth round.

The Gunners returned to Premier League action on 14 January at home against Crystal Palace, hoping to make it five wins in a row in all competitions. However, neither team was able to find the back of the net, and the game finished 0–0. The Eagles landed nine shots in the first half, which was the most that Arsenal had given up the first half in a home Premier League game all season. All game, the visitors had more of the higher quality chances. James Tomkins' header from an Eberechi Eze free kick in the thirty-ninth minute hit the crossbar, while Christian Benteke's header from a Tyrick Mitchell cross minutes later was parried wide by Bernd Leno. On the other hand, Arsenal struggled to seriously trouble Crystal Palace goalkeeper Vicente Guaita, and arguably their best performer was Granit Xhaka, who put in key tackles to stop Wilfried Zaha on several counterattacks. One silver lining that Arsenal could take away from the goalless draw was that they kept a fourth consecutive clean sheet and their third straight in league competition.

For the second time in nine days, Arsenal welcomed Newcastle United to the Emirates Stadium, this time in league competition. Like in the previous encounter, neither team was able to score in the first half, despite a near miss in the fifteenth minute when Pierre-Emerick Aubameyang hit the post from a tight angle. However, this time, Arsenal managed to secure the victory in regulation time. In the fiftieth minute, Thomas Partey, who made his first Premier League start since early December, hit a long pass out to Aubameyang out on the left, who in turn took on and ran past Newcastle right-back Emil Krafth before hitting a left-footed strike past Karl Darlow. Ten minutes later, another attack down the left-hand side of the field resulted in a second goal when Bukayo Saka struck home Emile Smith Rowe's low cross. Arsenal continued to utilize their good wing play, this time from the right side of the field. Saka found the overlapping right-back Cédric, who ran along the goal line before flashing a pass across goal that found Aubameyang for the latter's second goal of the game. The 3–0 win saw Arsenal extend their unbeaten streak in league competition.

Southampton's win over Shrewsbury Town in the third round of the FA Cup meant that Arsenal would face the Saints in consecutive away games at St Mary's Stadium within a four-day span. The first of these meetings was a fourth round FA Cup match on 23 January. An own goal from Gabriel, who deflected a shot by Southampton right-back Kyle Walker-Peters past Bernd Leno, proved to be the difference, handing the Saints a 1–0 win and ending the Gunners' six-match unbeaten streak in all competitions. Che Adams and James Ward-Prowse also came close to scoring for Southampton, while a potential penalty call from Shane Long was dismissed by referee Peter Bankes. On the other hand, Eddie Nketiah's deflected shot in the second half was Arsenal's best chance of scoring the whole game, and Saints goalkeeper Fraser Forster was seldom called into action. With the loss, Arsenal, the cup holders, were knocked out of the competition, while Southampton advanced to the fifth round to face Wolverhampton Wanderers. Notably, this was the first time in five attempts that Southampton defeated Arsenal in the FA Cup. For manager Mikel Arteta, this was his first loss in fifteen FA Cup games as either a player or a manager since he played in a fifth round loss to Blackburn Rovers in the 2012–13 FA Cup.

In the second of these meetings, this time a Premier League match on 26 January, both teams got on the board early. In the third minute, a corner from James Ward-Prowse found Stuart Armstrong on the edge of the box, and the Scotsman powered a half-volley past Bernd Leno. However, Arsenal was able to capitalize on the absences of both of the Saints' usual starting full-backs, those being left-back Ryan Bertrand (serving a one-match ban due to yellow card accumulation) and right-back Kyle Walker-Peters (out due to a quadriceps injury). A few minutes after the Saints' opening goal, Granit Xhaka cut a pass between Saints defenders Yan Valery and Jan Bednarek to find Nicolas Pépé, who held off Valery and fired past Alex McCarthy to the far post to level the score. In the thirty-ninth minute, Alexandre Lacazette played a pass to Bukayo Saka, who managed to get past Jake Vokins. McCarthy rushed outside of his penalty box to confront Saka before pulling back to avoid committing a foul, but the Southampton goalkeeper's mistake allowed Saka to easily get around him and tap in a second goal for the Gunners. In the second half, Arsenal sought to extend their lead and close out the game. A high floating pass from Cédric found Saka across the field in the seventy-second minute, and this time, Saka turned provider for Lacazette. A first time low cross from Saka found the French striker, who ran between and past Southampton center-backs Bednarek and Jack Stephens to tap in Arsenal's third goal. Despite a threatening free kick from Ward-Prowse late in the game that forced Leno to parry it away, Arsenal hung on for the 3–1 win, which saw Arsenal return to the top ten for the first time all season since Matchday 7 at the beginning of November.

Arsenal finished off the month by welcoming rivals Manchester United to the Emirates Stadium on 30 January. Both teams were evenly matched and had several opportunities each to score. In the twentieth minute, a corner from Luke Shaw, headed away by Rob Holding, fell to Fred just outside the box to scoop it towards the top corner, forcing a fingertip save from Bernd Leno. Shortly before the hour mark, a sequence of passes by Manchester United in and around the box ended up with Shaw laying off a pass to Edinson Cavani, but under heavy pressure from Cédric, the Uruguayan striker flashed the shot wide from six yards out. In the sixty-fifth minute, Alexandre Lacazette hit the crossbar with a free kick from the edge of the box. Less than a minute later, with Arsenal still on the attack, Cédric hit a looping cross into the box that met the head of Victor Lindelöf and fell to an unmarked Emile Smith Rowe, whose low shot towards the bottom corner forced de Gea to get down quickly and parry it away. A late substitution saw Norwegian attacking midfielder Martin Ødegaard, who had just signed on loan from Real Madrid until the end of the season, make his debut for the Gunners, coming on in place of Smith Rowe. In the eighty-ninth minute, Manchester United had the chance to steal the win, but a lapse in communication saw Cavani and Anthony Martial in the same location trying to connect with a cross from Aaron Wan-Bissaka. It was the former who got there first, but his scissor-kick only managed to divert the ball just wide of the post. The 0–0 draw meant that both teams shared the points, and Arsenal maintained their seven-game unbeaten streak in the league and a top ten placing.

=== February ===
On 2 February, Arsenal traveled to Molineux to take on Wolverhampton Wanderers, and the Gunners dominated the game for most of the first half. Bukayo Saka had two early shots on target, including one that hit the post in the first minute, before seemingly scoring in the ninth minute. A pull-back pass from Alexandre Lacazette was met with a half-volley from the edge of the box by Saka, but VAR quickly disallowed the goal, having found Lacazette offside on a knock-on header from Rob Holding. Arsenal continued to lay on the pressure and had another close miss when Emile Smith Rowe laid off a pass for the onrushing Nicolas Pépé, who could only managed to hit the woodwork. Minutes later, after wriggling past Nélson Semedo and nutmegging Rúben Neves, the Ivorian winger curled the ball to the far post and in to finally put Arsenal on the board. In first-half stoppage time, Daniel Podence played a pass between Arsenal defenders Holding and David Luiz to the advancing Willian José. As the Wolves striker continued his run into the box, his heel struck the knee of David Luiz and brought down both Brazilian players. Despite the minimal contact, characterized as "accidental" by NBCSN commentators Peter Drury and Phil Neville, referee Craig Pawson immediately brandished a red card to David Luiz, a call with which VAR referee Jon Moss agreed. With Arsenal down to ten players, Rúben Neves curled the penalty into the top corner to bring Wolves level and turn the tide of the game. A few minutes into the second half, a strike by João Moutinho from 25 yards out hit the post and flew in past a diving Bernd Leno to put Wolves into the lead. Arsenal's misfortunes were compounded on in the seventh-second minute with their second red card of the game, this time for Leno. Semedo played a long ball for the speedy Adama Traoré to chase, but the slightly overhit pass was met first by Leno just outside of the box. In a desperate attempt to parry the ball away from Traoré, the German misjudged the bounce of the ball and scooped it out of bounds with his hand, an illegal action for goalkeepers outside of their own penalty area. Pawson once again brought out a red card for the infraction, reducing Arsenal to just nine players for the remainder of the match, while backup goalkeeper Rúnar Alex Rúnarsson came on in goal. Arsenal were unable score again, and the 2–1 loss saw their winning streak came to an end, while Wolves completed a league double over Arsenal and snapped an eight-game winless streak.

Arsenal continued their Premier League campaign on 6 February with another away game at Villa Park against Aston Villa and former Arsenal goalkeeper Emiliano Martínez, who had signed with the Villans in the summer transfer window. The Gunners hoped to overturn the 3–0 loss from earlier in the season, but an early goal from the home side within 75 seconds turned out to be the only goal all game. John McGinn tried to play a through pass to Ollie Watkins, but it was cut out by Gabriel, who touched it to Cédric. The Portuguese full-back immediately tried to play it back to Gabriel, but the weight of the pass was not enough, and Bertrand Traoré rushed in to intercept it. Traoré then ran past Gabriel before crossing it to Watkins, who fired through the legs of Rob Holding. The deflection off Holding's legs was enough to take it past the reach of Mathew Ryan, who was deputizing in goal for the red-card-suspended Bernd Leno. The best opportunity from Arsenal to tie it up came from a Granit Xhaka free kick in the twenty-ninth minute that was tipped over by Martínez. The 1–0 loss saw Aston Villa complete their first league double over Arsenal in 38 years, who remained winless against the Villans in their last three Premier League meetings dating back to last season, the first of which also happened to be a 1–0 loss at Villa Park.

Eleventh place Arsenal took on tenth place Leeds United on 14 February in their first home Premier League match of the month. Captain Pierre-Emerick Aubameyang opened the scoring in the thirteenth minute after receiving a pass from Granit Xhaka and dribbling past Luke Ayling with a few stepovers before cutting inside and firing to the near post past Illan Meslier. In the thirty-ninth minute, Meslier tried to play out from the ball, but with Bukayo Saka applying heavy pressure, the Leeds goalkeeper hesitated to pass. A poor touch from Meslier as he tried to keep the ball away from Saka saw the latter get to the ball first, and Meslier subsequently clipped the back of Saka's ankles to give away a penalty. Aubameyang sent Meslier the wrong way and converted the penalty for his second goal of the game. As halftime approached, the Gunners continued to apply offensive pressure. A sequence of passes in and around the box was finished off when a pass from Dani Ceballos nutmegged Mateusz Klich and found Héctor Bellerín, whose shot managed to sneak under Meslier at the near post. Despite the 3–0 lead at halftime, Arsenal weren't content on just preserving their lead. Less than two minutes into the second half, Emile Smith Rowe lofted a cross to the back post, which Aubameyang headed in for his third goal of the game and his first hat-trick in the Premier League. Though Arsenal hoped to keep the clean sheet, Leeds hit back with two goals. First, a Raphinha corner in the fifty-eighth minute found Pascal Struijk, who got to the ball first ahead of David Luiz and Saka and headed it past Bernd Leno. Eleven minutes later, Raphinha played a through ball to Tyler Roberts, who ran to the touch line before pulling it back to Hélder Costa for a first-time finish. Leeds had a penalty shout later on, as Patrick Bamford's run into the box was stopped when he was squeezed between Cédric and Gabriel and fell over, but neither referee Stuart Attwell nor video assistant referee Andre Marriner decided to award it. Arsenal hoped to stymie Leeds' late rally and put the game out of reach, but Aubameyang and Saka managed to only hit the woodwork with each of their shots. The 4–2 victory saw the two teams swap places in the standings, and Arsenal moved back into the top ten. With the hat-trick, Aubameyang also surpassed the milestone of at least 200 goals in Europe's top five leagues, becoming only the ninth player ever to reach that mark.

The Europa League knockout phase began with matches in the round of 32 on 18 February, and Arsenal took on Benfica. Because of COVID-19 travel restrictions, the first leg match took place at the Stadio Olimpico in Rome instead of at Benfica's home ground, the Estádio da Luz, in Lisbon. Arsenal had the first big chance of the game in the eighteenth minute: Dani Ceballos played a through pass to fellow Spaniard Héctor Bellerín, who ran past Benfica left-back Álex Grimaldo. Bellerín played in a low cross and found Pierre-Emerick Aubameyang, hot off a hat-trick, but the forward missed just wide with his left foot from eight yards as he tried to slot it in past Helton Leite. Neither team managed to get another major chance in the first half, and the score remained 0–0 at halftime. In the fifty-third minute, a Benfica corner found its way to Diogo Gonçalves on the edge of the box, but his cross was blocked by Emile Smith Rowe, whose arm made contact with the ball. After taking a moment to think about it, referee Cüneyt Çakır branded a yellow card to Smith Rowe and awarded Benfica the penalty, which Pizzi converted just past the reach of Bernd Leno. However, the Portuguese side's lead did not last long. After dragging a shot wide minutes ago, Bukayo Saka tapped in a Cédric cross from close range. Neither team managed to break the 1–1 deadlock; Aubameyang came close to putting Arsenal on top in the sixty-third minute but he dragged his shot wide.

On 21 February, Arsenal returned to Premier League action to face league leaders Manchester City at Emirates Stadium. Like in the previous fixture in mid-October, the Gunners lost 1–0, with the only goal coming from Raheem Sterling again. Less than 80 seconds into the game, Riyad Mahrez hit a looping cross that found Sterling in the box, who headed the ball in from six yards out and gave Bernd Leno little chance to make a save. City dominated the rest of the game and had a greater percentage of scoring chances, including an eightieth-minute João Cancelo trivela shot from close range that curled just wide of the post. Arsenal, on the other hand, only managed one shot on target, that being a long range effort from Kieran Tierney at the half-hour mark.

A week after the first leg of the Europa League round of 32 matches, Arsenal took on Benfica in the second leg on 25 February. The match was originally scheduled to be held at Arsenal's home ground, the Emirates Stadium, but once again, due to COVID-19 travel restrictions, the match had to take place at a neutral venue, this time at the Karaiskakis Stadium in Piraeus, Greece. Notably, this was the home stadium of Olympiacos, who had knocked the Gunners out of last season's Europa League competition in the round of 32 on away goals. Arsenal kicked off the scoring in the twenty-first minute with the first real scoring chance from either team. Bukayo Saka cut a pass through the Benfica defense for Pierre-Emerick Aubameyang, who was closely marked and kept just onside by Lucas Veríssimo, to run onto in the box. As goalkeeper Helton Leite ran out and went to ground, Aubameyang chipped the ball over him to the far post and in to give Arsenal the early lead. However, as the game neared halftime, Benfica drew even with a 23-yard free kick from Diogo Gonçalves that found the top corner past a diving Bernd Leno. Shortly after the hour mark, the Eagles pulled ahead, swinging the aggregate score in their favor. A long goal kick from Helton Leite was poorly dealt with by Dani Ceballos, who headed it backwards. The ball fell to Rafa Silva, leaving him open for a one-on-one with Leno, as Ceballos had been the last man in defense. Leno rushed out of his box to try and confront Silva, but the Benfica midfielder tapped it past Leno and into the open goal. However, it did not take long for Arsenal to respond. In the sixty-seventh minute, Kieran Tierney played a pass down the left flank for Willian, who had just been substituted in place of Ceballos five minutes prior. Willian carried the ball towards the touch line before cutting it back to Tierney, who ran past Everton before striking the ball to the far bottom corner. Though Tierney's goal tied up the match and the aggregate score, Benfica still had the advantage with two away goals to Arsenal's one. In the seventy-seventh minute, as Helton Leite hesitated with the ball at his feet, Aubameyang applied pressure and rushed in, just managing to block the goalkeeper from getting off a long kick. The deflection fell to Saka, who slashed it wide and was unable to capitalize on the mistake. With their Europe League campaign on the line, Arsenal left it late to get the go-ahead goal and avoid the same fate in consecutive years. On-loan attacking midfielder Martin Ødegaard found Saka on the right flank in the eighty-seventh minute. With a few stepovers, Saka managed to get himself a yard of space past substitute left-back Nuno Tavares and cross the ball to the far post. Aubameyang beat Lucas Veríssimo to the ball and headed it in for his second goal of the game. Crucially, this gave Arsenal a 3–2 lead in the game and tipped the aggregate score (4–3) back in Arsenal's favor. After a brief VAR check for offsides, the goal was confirmed, and Arsenal hung on for the win, advancing them to the round of 16.

To finish off the month, Arsenal headed to the King Power Stadium to take on Leicester City. For the game, manager Mikel Arteta chose to rest several key players that had played in the Benfica match just three days prior, including Bukayo Saka and captain Pierre-Emerick Aubameyang. Leicester got off to a fast start. In the sixth minute, Youri Tielemans intercepted a pass from Granit Xhaka meant for Willian before running free down the right flank and into the box, where he struck a shot that went in at the far post. The Foxes nearly doubled their lead from the ensuing kickoff. Bernd Leno received a back pass from David Luiz, but with Jamie Vardy charging forward and applying pressure, Leno attempted to return the pass to the defender. Vardy managed to intercept the pass, but his first touch took the ball back into Leno's hands. At the other end of the field, Nicolas Pépé made a run into the box in the twelfth minute but was tripped up after both Tielemans and Wilfred Ndidi seemed to clip his ankles. Referee Paul Tierney initially awarded the penalty, despite Tielemans' protests, but video assistant referee David Coote adjudged the foul to have occurred just outside the box, so a free kick was awarded instead. In the thirty-eighth minute, Pépé tried to run past Thomas down the right flank but was brought down outside the box, which resulted in a yellow card for Thomas and another free kick for Arsenal. Willian took the free kick and found David Luiz, who ran free of his marker Timothy Castagne and headed the ball to the far post past Kasper Schmeichel. As halftime approached, Pépé continued to threaten, this time taking a shot from just outside the box. Ndidi raised his arm to block the shot on the edge of the box, but referee Tierney didn't initially award the penalty. However, after the intervention of VAR and Tierney having a second look on the VAR monitor, Arsenal were given the penalty and the chance to take the lead. As Schmeichel dived to the right, Lacazette converted the penalty into the bottom left corner. After a scrummage for possession in the middle of the field early in the second half, Xhaka found Pépé on the right flank, who pushed towards the goal. Pépé centered it to Martin Ødegaard, who found Willian near the touch line. As Schmeichel charged forward to close the angle, Willian stabbed the ball over the goalkeeper and through Tielemans' legs for Pépé to tap in. Leicester didn't look to seriously threaten or challenge Leno in the rest of the second half, and Arsenal closed out the game for a 3–1 win.

=== March ===
Arsenal headed to Turf Moor on 6 March to take on Burnley, and it was the Gunners who got on the board early. Just over five minutes into the game, Thomas Partey passed through the middle to Willian, who ran forward unchallenged from the center circle and passed to Pierre-Emerick Aubameyang on the left flank. Aubameyang squared up against Matthew Lowton and executed a few stepovers to move free of the Burnley right-back before cutting inside and firing a low shot towards the near bottom corner. Though Nick Pope managed to get a hand on the ball, the power of the shot carried it the ball past Pope into the goal. Bukayo Saka had the chance to double Arsenal's lead on twenty-two minutes; a one-two pass from Aubameyang bounced off of Ben Mee, James Tarkowski, and Charlie Taylor before falling to Saka, who tried to nudge the ball past Pope but the shot rolled just wide of the near post. Before halftime, Burnley would equalize, capitalizing on an Arsenal defensive error in the thirty-ninth minute. The Gunners were trying to play out from the back, and Pablo Marí passed back to Bernd Leno, who found a retreating Granit Xhaka in the middle of the field. Xhaka tried to quickly pass it to David Luiz out on the right flank, but the poor pass bounced off the chest of Chris Wood and into the goal. In the second half, Burnley kept Leno busy on a few occasions, including two shots from Matěj Vydra and a long looping shot from Erik Pieters that had to be tipped over the bar. Controversy arose in the seventy-first minute with the first of two penalty shouts for handball. Nicolas Pépé made his way into the box and squared off against Pieters. When Pépé tried to get the ball up and past Pieters, the ball hit Pieters' outstretched hand, but neither referee Andre Marriner nor video assistant referee Kevin Friend bothered to have a second thought about the infraction. Arsenal missed several good chances to score, including in the eighty-first minute, when Pépé swung and missed at a first-time Kieran Tierney cross. A few minutes later, Pépé managed to connect with a looping cross from Saka, but his shot hit Pieters and clanged off the crossbar. Pieters had stuck out his arm in an attempt to block the shot, and Marriner showed him a red card for the infraction. However, after VAR review found the ball to have contacted Pieters' shoulder, Marriner rescinded the red card. In stoppage time, Arsenal desperately tried to find a late winner with a barrage of shots from Aubameyang, Saka, Pablo Marí, Alexandre Lacazette, and Dani Ceballos, the last of which clattered off the post for the final shot of the game, ending 1–1.

On 11 March, Arsenal faced Olympiacos in the first leg of their Europa League round of 16 match. For the second straight Europa League match, the game took place at the Karaiskakis Stadium, Olympiacos' home ground. Arsenal came closing to scoring early, as a Pierre-Emerick Aubameyang header from a Héctor Bellerín cross in the sixth minute deflected off of former Arsenal defender Sokratis' shoulder and was punched onto the crossbar by José Sá before the goalkeeper scrambled to his feet to collect the ball safely. Arsenal dominated the first half, and their pressure finally paid off in the 34th minute. As Olympiacos tried to play out of the back, several Arsenal players pushed forward in the high press, eventually causing a pass to be intercepted by Thomas Partey. Partey immediately passed it to Martin Ødegaard, who had several yards of space to run into before he fired a shot from outside the box. Though the shot was quite central and Sá managed to get a hand to it, the power of the shot carried it over Sá and in for Ødegaard's first Arsenal goal. Several minutes later, Arsenal nearly made the same mistake; as David Luiz tried to pass out of the back, the pressing Georgios Masouras blocked the ball before curling a shot high and wide of the far post. However, Olympiacos would eventually exploit the Gunners' tactic and force a mistake. In the fifty-eighth minute, Gabriel passed back to Bernd Leno, who played it forward to Dani Ceballos, who had just been substituted on for Partey. Youssef El-Arabi immediately closed down and dispossessed the Spaniard before breaking forward and firing past the outstretched hand of the retreating Leno. The Greek side nearly made it two in quick succession when Lazar Ranđelović fed the ball to El-Arabi near the penalty spot, but the shot was deflected wide by a diving Bellerín. In the seventy-ninth minute, Ødegaard played the corner short to Willian, who sent a high looping cross into the box. Gabriel leapt high above his opposite number Yann M'Vila and headed the ball back in the same direction to the top corner over José Sá. A few minutes later, the Gunners would secure the win, as substitute Mohamed Elneny was allowed to run free and unchallenged through the middle of the field before he shot from around 25 yards out. The power and technique of the shot curled it away from Sá, who could only tip it onto the post and in. With the 3–1 victory and three away goals, Arsenal put themselves into a good position heading into the second leg.

Arsenal faced fierce rivals Tottenham Hotspur at the Emirates Stadium on 14 March in the second North London Derby of the season. Despite the importance of the match, manager Mikel Arteta dropped captain Pierre-Emerick Aubameyang from the starting line-up to the bench for disciplinary issues. Initially, the omission seemed to have backfired when Tottenham got on the board first shortly after the half-hour mark. Gareth Bale played a switch ball across the field to Sergio Reguilón, whose first touch pass fell to Lucas Moura in the box, who in turn tapped it to substitute Erik Lamela, on for the injured Son Heung-min. Lamela set his feet before hitting a curling rabona shot through the legs of Thomas Partey, around David Luiz, and past the reach of Bernd Leno. However, the Gunners would draw level before halftime. Kieran Tierney sized up Matt Doherty on the left flank before sprinting past the Spurs right-back and finding Martin Ødegaard in the box. Ødegaard's shot deflected off the inside of the legs of Toby Alderweireld, leaving Hugo Lloris with no chance to make a save as the Norwegian loanee scored his first Premier League goal and his second goal in as many games overall. In the sixty-second minute, substitute Nicolas Pépé fired a through pass to Alexandre Lacazette, who had split the Spurs' center-backs. With his second touch, Lacazette attempted a volley and misfired, but in the follow-through, Davinson Sánchez bundled into his legs, tripping him over. Despite the protests of the Tottenham players and coaches, referee Michael Oliver awarded Arsenal the penalty and Sánchez a yellow card for the foul, both of which were upheld by video assistant referee Paul Tierney. This time, Lacazette fired true, slotting the penalty in the bottom corner as Lloris dived the other way. Down 2–1, Tottenham made matters worse for themselves in the seventy-sixth minute. Lamela, who had already been shown a yellow card in the first half, struck Kieran Tierney in the face with an outstretched hand, prompting Oliver to show him a second yellow card, amounting to a red card and a sending off. Despite being reduced to ten men, Tottenham twice came close to equalizing. Minutes after Lamela's sending off, Harry Kane was offside when he headed in a Lucas Moura free kick. Near the end of regulation time, Kane fired a low free kick that bounced off the far post, and the follow-up shot from Sánchez had to be cleared off the line by Gabriel. Despite the five minutes of stoppage time, Arsenal managed to hold on for the win.

At the Emirates Stadium on 18 March, Arsenal welcomed Olympiacos in the second leg of their Europa League round of 16 match. With the 3–1 result from the first leg, the Gunners hoped to eliminate the visitors and avoiding eliminating at the hands of the same team for the second straight European campaign. In the nineteenth minute, José Sá launched a long kick downfield to find Youssef El-Arabi sprinting through the Arsenal defense. With Dani Ceballos and Héctor Bellerín giving chase, El-Arabi's shot deflected wide off Bernd Leno's shin. Arsenal continued to have good scoring chances but were unable to capitalize on them. In the twenty-third minute, Gabriel beat El-Arabi in an aerial duel for another of Sá's long kicks and passed forward to Aubameyang, who, with his back to goal, laid it off to Ceballos. Ceballos returned the pass to Aubameyang in between the Olympiacos center-backs, but his shot went just over the bar from 12 yards out. A few minutes into the second half, Yann M'Vila put in a challenge on Ceballos, managed to dispossess him, and poked the ball to Georgios Masouras, who found El-Arabi ahead on the left flank. El-Arabi cut inside on David Luiz before firing a shot that deflected off Gabriel's back and in. The Gunners hoped to rebound quickly; a pacy first-time cross from Kieran Tierney fizzed across the box to Nicolas Pépé, but his shot deflected off the head of teammate Emile Smith Rowe and over the bar. With around ten minutes left in regulation time, El-Arabi found himself again on the losing end of a challenge. This time, Granit Xhaka dispossessed him and found Martin Ødegaard, who quickly passed to Aubameyang on the break. Aubameyang found himself one-on-one against José Sá and tried to chip the ball past the goalkeeper, but his effort went well wide of the goal. With time winding down and Olympiacos still behind, a moment of frustration from Ousseynou Ba saw the Greek side reduced to ten men. As Gabriel Martinelli tried to sprint past Ba, the latter caught the former in the face and brought him down, for which referee Carlos del Cerro Grande showed a yellow card. In response to the yellow card, Ba threw the ball away, prompting del Cerro to brandish a second yellow card in quick succession and dismiss Ba. Aubameyang had two more chances in quick succession to equalize: his backheel flick was deflected up in the air by José Sá, and the rebound was scissor-kicked over the bar. Though El-Arabi's goal gave Olympiacos the win, the Greek side would have still needed two more goals with Arsenal having the advantage on away goals. With an aggregate score of 3–2, Arsenal advanced to the Europa League quarterfinals for the third time in the last four seasons.

On 21 March, Arsenal faced fellow London side West Ham United at the London Stadium for both teams' last matches of the month before the international break. It was the home team who got off to a hot start, jumping out to a 3–0 in the first thirty-five minutes. West Ham dominated possession in the opening fifteen minutes, and their efforts paid off when Michail Antonio found Jesse Lingard on the edge of the box, whose shot curled away from Bernd Leno into the top far corner. Less than two minutes later, referee Jon Moss awarded the Hammers a free kick on the edge of the box after he judged Bukayo Saka to have committed a foul by clipping Antonio's ankles. As the Arsenal players stood and protested, Jesse Lingard took the free kick quickly and found Jarrod Bowen unmarked on the right flank. Bowen was able to run towards goal before squeezing the shot under the hands of Leno, who punched the turf in frustration. Just after the half-hour mark, West Ham scored their third. Tomáš Souček played a through ball for Bowen to chase after, but Kieran Tierney recovered well to block Bowen's first time cross. The deflection fell to Vladimír Coufal, who sent a high looping header into the box for Antonio, who jumped higher than David Luiz to nod it in. However, on its way in, the ball was unintentionally touched by Souček's foot, leading to claims of offside from several Arsenal players. A VAR check from Martin Atkinson confirmed that the ball had indeed touched Souček, who was onside and awarded the goal, with Antonio given his second assist of the game. From that point, Arsenal finally began to get in the game. In the thirty-eighth minute, Calum Chambers's low cross found Alexander Lacazette in the box. After Lacazette took a touch to steady the ball, he lashed a half-volley attempt that deflected off Souček's outstretched leg and just above the reach of West Ham goalkeeper Łukasz Fabiański, a former Arsenal player. However, because Lacazette's shot was measured to have been going wide initially, it was given as an own goal to Souček. At the hour mark, the Gunners would halve the deficit with another West Ham own goal. Martin Ødegaard played it out wide for Chambers to hit a first time cross into the box, but instead of it reaching an Arsenal player, West Ham center-back Craig Dawson's forward momentum saw him smash the ball into the back of the net before he collided into Fabiański. In the eighty-second minute, the Gunners completed the comeback. Ødegaard played it out wide for another first-time cross, this time from Nicolas Pépé, to be headed in by a leaping Lacazette, who found himself unchallenged between Dawson and Coufal. Minutes later, West Ham nearly came away with all three points. As they looked to clear after an attacking phase of Arsenal, Declan Rice ran from penalty box to penalty box, dribbling past several Arsenal players. With David Luiz closely marking Antonio, the only other West Ham player surging forward, Rice was forced to take a shot, which Leno easily parried out of harm's way. After being down by three goals early on, Arsenal managed overcome their poor start to escape with a 3–3 draw, though both Lacazette and manager Mikel Arteta expressed frustration at how Arsenal had started the game.

=== April ===
After the international break, Arsenal resumed their Premier League campaign with a home game against Liverpool on 2 April. In the first half, the Gunners managed to hold strong against Liverpool, and it remained scoreless at halftime. It was not until the sixty-fourth minute when the defending champions scored the first goal of the game, from which point they dominated the rest of the game. Trent Alexander-Arnold's cross found substitute Diogo Jota in between Calum Chambers and Rob Holding, and the Portuguese forward's header from close range was too powerful for Bernd Leno to keep out. A few minutes later, Liverpool would double their lead through Mohamed Salah. Fabinho played a long pass over the top for Salah to chase, but Gabriel just about managed to get to it first. With Salah bearing down, the defender's first time effort to try and tackle the ball out of play was blocked by Salah, who now had a few yards of space in which to run forward unopposed. Salah held his patience before slotting the ball through Leno's legs into the goal. Salah had a chance to get two goals in quick succession; in the seventy-second minute, Roberto Firmino lofted a pass to Salah, who ran between Gabriel and Cédric. This time, Leno was able to get behind the shot and parry it away, although he had to scramble for the rebound to prevent Salah from regaining possession. In the closing ten minutes, Liverpool would add a third goal to their tally. After Leno collected a shot from Georginio Wijnaldum, he rolled it to Gabriel, whose pass to Cédric out on the left flank was intercepted by Alexander-Arnold. With his first touch, the Liverpool right-back passed to Salah, who turned infield and found Sadio Mané near the penalty spot. Mohamed Elneny managed to dispossess Mané, but this left the ball free for an onrushing Diogo Jota to blast it in for his second game of the match.

In the Europa League quarter-finals, Arsenal were drawn against Slavia Prague. The first leg occurred on 8 April at the Emirates Stadium. Neither side had much of an offensive spark in the first half, and the score was still 0–0 at halftime; the closest chances from either side were Rob Holding's header and Lukáš Provod's long shot, respectively, both of which went just over the bar. In the opening minutes of the second half, as Bukayo Saka tried to chase down a pass from Héctor Bellerín, he was brought down just outside of the box by David Zima, who was booked for the foul. Willian took the ensuing free kick and sent it clattering off the right post. Just after the hour mark, Oscar Dorley received a backwards pass from Provod and was immediately put under pressure by Alexandre Lacazette. Lacazette dispossessed Dorley, who was the deepest player and thus the last line of defense for Slavia Prague, and broke free for a one-on-one opportunity against Ondřej Kolář, who was wearing a mask and helmet in his first game back from a skull fracture injury suffered in an earlier Europa League game. Once again, a good Arsenal chance hit the woodwork, as Lacazette's attempt to chip the ball over Kolář hit the top right corner of the goal frame. As the game went on, several players from both sides, including substitutes Pierre-Emerick Aubameyang, Gabriel Martinelli, and Petr Ševčík, missed good opportunities either just wide or just high of the goal. In the eighty-sixth minute, Arsenal looked to have won the game, as Nicolas Pépé, another substitute, beat Zima to a pass from Aubameyang and lifted the ball over an onrushing Kolář. However, in the closing seconds of extra time, Slavia Prague managed to find the equalizer. First, a shot from Provod was pushed onto the post by Leno to force a corner. From the ensuing set piece, Provod's corner bounced off Pépé's thigh for Tomáš Holeš, who beat Cédric at the far post, to head in from point blank range. Though the game ended 1–1, Slavia Prague came away with a crucial away goal ahead of the second leg.

On 11 April, Arsenal headed north to Bramall Lane to take on relegation-embattled Sheffield United. The Gunners exerted their dominance and set the tempo early on, as an early break in the third minute saw Gabriel Martinelli find Bukayo Saka ahead of him, but the latter's shot went just past the near top corner. In the thirty-third minute, a series of one- and two-touch passes in the final third put Arsenal on the scoreboard. Nicolas Pépé passed the ball out wide to Calum Chambers on the right, who returned it centrally to Thomas Partey. Partey found Alexandre Lacazette on the edge of the box, who immediately played a one-two with Saka. On the return pass, the ball was helped on its way by a Dani Ceballos backheel to Lacazette, who slid the ball into the net past Aaron Ramsdale. In the seventy-first minute, an errant John Lundstram pass was intercepted by Pépé, who then ran forward and managed to get off a low shot towards the far post. Ramsdale could only manage to parry the ball right to Martinelli, who was closest to the rebound and tapped it into the open net to double the Gunners' lead. Arsenal would put the game to bed in the eighty-fifth minute, when an accurate through pass from Partey cut through the Sheffield lines to find Lacazette, who outsprinted Ethan Ampadu to fire in his second goal of the game. The goal also saw Lacazette reach the benchmark of 50 Premier League goals, being only the 10th Arsenal player in history to achieve that feat. The Blades, with only two shots on target, never really managed to challenge Bernd Leno, who kept his first clean sheet in ten Premier League games dating back to the end of January. With the 3–0 result, bottom-of-the-table Sheffield United moved within one game of relegation, while Arsenal moved up to ninth, ahead of Leeds United on goal difference.

In the second leg of the Europa League quarter-finals on 15 April, Arsenal hoped to finish the job against Slavia Prague and advance to the semi-finals, and a three-goal flurry in a six-minute span early in the first half essentially wrapped up the tie. Arsenal looked to have scored in the fourteenth minute, as a Bukayo Saka strike that ricocheted off the far post fell to Emile Smith Rowe to tap it into the open net, but a VAR review found Smith Rowe to have been offside on Saka's shot. Shortly thereafter, the first goal would come in the eighteenth minute; Smith Rowe wriggled around several Slavia Prague defenders in the box and slipped a pass through to Nicolas Pépé, who bided his time before finding a better angle to fire past Ondřej Kolář from close range. Two minutes later, the Gunners were on the offense again, and as Saka ran to get onto the end of a Smith Rowe cutback pass, Jakub Hromada stuck a leg out to try and intercept the pass but managed only to trip Saka over. For the foul, referee Cüneyt Çakır showed Hromada a yellow card and awarded Arsenal a penalty, which Alexandre Lacazette successfully converted into the opposite corner by hesitating briefly to send Kolář diving the wrong way. The third goal in quick succession came in the twenty-fourth minute. As Calum Chambers ran to receive a pass out wide from Thomas Partey, he evaded the challenge from Slavia Prague captain Jan Bořil, who had advanced forward from left-back, and passed ahead to Saka on the wing. With Bořil out of position, Saka cut inside on David Zima to buy himself a few yards of space to let off a shot, which went in at the near post past a stationary Kolář. Arsenal's dominance in the first half was eminent; in addition to their three-goal tally, they prevented the Czech side from having a single shot on target. This prompted Slavia Prague manager Jindřich Trpišovský to make four substitutions at half-time, though to little effect. Instead, the Gunners added a fourth goal on seventy-seven minutes. Granit Xhaka played a pass that sat up for Nicolas Pépé to receive and sprint on the left flank, and the winger's cross found Lacazette in the box. Zima, who was marking Lacazette, slipped, giving the Frenchman space to maneuver and fire home his second goal of the game for his second brace in as many games in all competitions. The 4–0 win and the 5–1 aggregate score saw Arsenal advanced through to face Villarreal and former Arsenal manager Unai Emery.

Despite blitzing Slavia Prague for four goals midweek and beating Fulham comfortably in Matchweek 1 of the season, Arsenal came crashing back down at home on 18 April against the 18th place Cottagers, with neither side seemingly able to fire on all cylinders. It did not help Arsenal that captain Pierre-Emerick Aubameyang had caught malaria playing for Gabon over the international break, sidelining him for a few weeks. In the second minute, Alexandre Lacazette found Gabriel Martinelli bursting through the Fulham defense with a looping pass, but the latter's effort to lift the ball over goalkeeper Alphonse Areola went wide of the post. At the other end of the field, Fulham had a near miss in the twentieth minute, as a Bobby Decordova-Reid shot from the edge of the box ricocheted off Gabriel and fell to Josh Maja, whose shot took a deflection off Rob Holding and just rolled wide of the near post past a scrambling Mathew Ryan. In the fortieth minute, Dani Ceballos seemed to have scored a header from a Héctor Bellerín cross, but video assistant referee Stuart Attwell judged Bukayo Saka, who had made the pass to Bellerín, to be just offside in the buildup, so the goal was taken off. Though the game was still scoreless at halftime, it did not take long for the first goal to come. Just before the hour mark, with Fulham on the offense, Mario Lemina tried to play a through pass to Ola Aina that was cut out by Gabriel. As Lemina and Gabriel chased after the loose ball, the former reached it first and was tripped over by the latter in the box. After a moment of consideration, referee Craig Pawson awarded the Cottagers a penalty, which Maja easily dispatched into the roof of the net. Around ten minutes later, Martinelli trapped a through pass from Emith Smith Rowe just out of reach of Areola before sending in a cross from the touchline to the far post, where it found the head of Nicolas Pépé, but the header from a tight angle hit a recovering Areola and was cleared off the goal line by Tosin Adarabioyo to maintain the Fulham lead. In the seventh minute of stoppage time, Ryan, who had not faced a single shot on target except for the penalty, sprinted forward from his own box to give Saka another player to target for the corner. It was indeed Ryan who connected with the corner and headed the ball on to Ceballos, whose low shot bobbled through the crowd to Areola. Forced to react quickly, Areola could not parry the shot far enough away, as substitute Eddie Nketiah was the fastest to react for an easy tap-in. The goal was confirmed after another VAR check judged Holding to not have made any attempt to play the ball despite being offside on Ceballos' shot. With the last-minute Arsenal equalizer, both London sides shared the spoils.

On the same day as the draw against Fulham, the club announced their participation in the proposed European Super League as one of the 12 founding member clubs. The news drew immediate and heavy backlash from fans and commentators, especially considering Arsenal's struggles and subpar league standing this season. Under heavy pressure, and with the other five English clubs withdrawing from the Super League, Arsenal announced their withdrawal on 20 April, just two days after the initial announcement. Despite this, fans continued to protest, calling for American owner Stan Kroenke to leave the club.

Although Arsenal hoped to return to winning ways after the underwhelming draw against Fulham, their disappointing Premier League form continued on 23 April, as they lost at home to Everton 1–0 thanks to a Bernd Leno own goal late in the game. In the first half, Everton twice had good scoring opportunities, though neither chance was converted. At the half-hour mark, Bernd Leno did enough to parry a Richarlison shot out of the reach of a fast-closing Dominic Calvert-Lewin, while Gylfi Sigurðsson hit the top of the crossbar with a free kick from around 27 yards out in the thirty-ninth minute. Six minutes into the second half, Arsenal looked to have been awarded a penalty. As Dani Ceballos tried to dribble the ball away from Richarlison in the box, the latter player appeared to have stuck a foot out and caught Ceballos on the shin, bringing him down. Referee Jon Moss pointed to the spot, but video assistant referee David Coote found Nicolas Pépé to be offside in the buildup, thus nullifying the penalty call. At the other end of the field, Everton had a penalty shout of their own, as a Richarlison cutback hit Pablo Marí's arm, but a quick VAR check ruled Marí's arms to be down by his side in a natural defender's position. In the seventy-sixth minute, Allan picked out Richarlison with a long ball over the top. The Brazilian winger was able to twice get the better of Granit Xhaka, deputizing at left-back, and fire off a low cross into the box for Calvert-Lewin. However, the slightly mishit cross came to Leno for what should have been an easy scoop-up, but the ball slipped through his hands and deflected off his leg on the way up. The ensuing VAR check confirmed Richarlison to be onside for Allan's pass, thus not sparing Leno's blushes. The Gunners tried to find yet another last-minute equalizer in stoppage time but to no avail. Willian tried to pick out the advanced Leno with a cross, but the goalkeeper was marked by Allan, who got to the ball first and could only head it into the path of Martin Ødegaard, whose volley through a crowd of players was saved by Jordan Pickford. Had Ødegaard's volley gone in, it would not have counted, as Moss had already blown the whistle for a Leno foul on Allan as they both leapt for the cross.

Villarreal and former Arsenal manager Unai Emery welcomed the Gunners to the Estadio de la Cerámica on 29 April for the first leg of the Europa League semi-finals. In the opening minutes, Villarreal managed to get on the scoreboard early with the first chance of the game. As Samuel Chukwueze tried to dribble between Granit Xhaka and Dani Ceballos, the ball slipped free for Manu Trigueros to fire a low shot across goal into the far corner. Just before the half hour mark, the Yellow Submarine would double the lead. A Dani Parejo corner was headed on by Gerard Moreno for Raúl Albiol to volley in from point-blank range at the far post. A few minutes later, Arsenal looked to seemingly stymie Villarreal's momentum with a penalty. Xhaka played a long pass down the left flank for Nicolas Pépé, and as he tried to dribble past Tottenham loanee Juan Foyth into the box, the former was tripped over by the latter. Referee Artur Soares Dias immediately awarded the penalty, but VAR review found Pépé to have handled the ball with his arm before the foul, thus cancelling the penalty call and Foyth's yellow card. Foyth had been repeatedly allowed to make forward runs, and one such run towards the end of the first half was stopped when he was tripped up by Ceballos, who was shown a yellow card as a result. Having finished the first half without a shot on target, Arsenal hoped to turn their fortunes around, but Ceballos' sending off ten minutes into the second half put them at an even greater disadvantage. As Cebellos chased after a slightly overhit pass from Pépé, Parejo slid in and poked it away before Ceballos could get to it. However, in doing so, Ceballos stepped on Parejo's outstretched ankle in stride, earning the former a second yellow card, which amounted to a red card and a dismissal. Villarreal nearly got a third goal in the sixty-sixth minute: substitute Francis Coquelin, a former Arsenal player, played on Moreno for a one-on-one with Leno, but the resulting shot was right at the goalkeeper, who tipped it over the bar. In the seventy-first minute, Arsenal would get another penalty call . As Bukayo Saka attempted to take on and dribble past several Villarreal defenders, he was tripped up by Trigueros. This time, the penalty stood, and with Arsenal's first shot on target, Pépé fired down the middle just past the feet of Gerónimo Rulli, who dived to his right, to halve the deficit. Later on, Villarreal saw themselves also reduced to ten men: Étienne Capoue, who had earlier been awarded a yellow card for a foul on Pépé, put in a late sliding tackle on Saka. In doing so, Capoue injured himself and was taken off the field on a stretcher, but to add insult to injury, Dias showed him a second yellow card for the foul, amounting to another red card and dismissal. Despite the 2–1 loss, the crucial away goal gave Arsenal more of a fighting chance ahead of the second leg at home in a week's time.

=== May ===
Heading into the last month of the Premier League season, Arsenal headed up north to take on Newcastle United at St James' Park on 2 May. Just like Villarreal did mid-week, the Gunners opened the scoring in the opening minutes. David Luiz played a long pass to find Héctor Bellerín behind the Newcastle defense. Bellerín's first-time cross found Pierre-Emerick Aubameyang in the box, but the Gunners captain mistimed his shot and the ball ricocheted backwards off his heel. The ball bounced to the edge of the box for Mohamed Elneny to volley it, and despite Martin Dúbravka getting a palm to the ball, the pace of the shot carried it into the net for Elneny's first Premier League goal in 66 games. As the game progressed, both goalkeepers were forced to make crucial saves: Allan Saint-Maximin's self-deflected shot was tipped over by Mathew Ryan, while Granit Xhaka's long-range effort was palmed away by Dúbravka. On the ensuing set piece from the latter opportunity, Elneny nearly scored again: his header from a Willian corner was headed off the goal line by Miguel Almirón. In the second half, another Arsenal goal helped put the game to bed. After Aubameyang was dispossessed, Martin Ødegaard found Gabriel Martinelli in space out wide on the left flank. Martinelli's first-time cross flew past the outstretched leg of Ciaran Clark to Aubameyang, and this time, he connected well with the ball to volley in from close range. To make matters worse for Newcastle, a poor tackle from Fabian Schär on Martinelli in the ninetieth minute resulted in a straight red card and a dismissal from referee Mike Dean, capping off a comfortable 2–0 Gunners win.

With home advantage in the second leg of the Europa League semi-finals, Arsenal hoped to overcome the one-goal deficit against Villarreal on 6 May. The visitors, on the other hand, wasted no time trying to increase their lead and put the tie out of reach, as a curling shot from Samuel Chukwueze in the fifth minute forced Bernd Leno to make an acrobatic save. In the twenty-sixth minute, the ball pinballed around the box before falling to Pierre-Emerick Aubameyang, whose trivela shot hit the far post past a scrambling Gerónimo Rulli. Another Aubameyang shot, this time in the thirty-ninth minute, was spilled by Rulli between his legs, but the goalkeeper managed to secure the shot before it rolled into the goal. With the score still at 0–0, Arsenal came out of halftime hoping to pick up the intensity. In the first three minutes, shots from Nicolas Pépé and Emile Smith Rowe both curled just wide of the far post. With less than fifteen minutes left in the match, the Gunners still continued to search for an equalizer goal, which, with the away goal advantage from the first leg, would have sent Arsenal to the final. However, Aubameyang hit the woodwork once again in the seventy-ninth minute, this time with a header off the near post from a Héctor Bellerín cross. Even with five extra minutes of stoppage time, the Gunners were unable to score; the 0–0 result meant that Villarreal would advance to the Europa League final with the 2–1 result from the first leg. The elimination, combined with the unlikely prospect of finishing seventh at best in the league, meant that next season Arsenal could be missing out on European competition altogether for the first time since the 1995–96 season.

Three days later, Arsenal returned to Premier League action, hoping to do one better against West Bromwich Albion at home. However, the Baggies were the more threatening team early on: Matheus Pereira's hit from outside of the box curled just wide of the far post and Bernd Leno, and while Callum Robinson's chip over Leno hit the crossbar, he was found to be offside regardless. Twenty-nine minutes in, Willian played the ball down the line for Bukayo Saka, whose low cross found Emile Smith Rowe amongst the West Brom defense to be volleyed in from close range for the latter's first Premier League goal in 19 appearances. To compound West Brom's troubles, Arsenal added a second goal five minutes later. On the right flank, Nicolas Pépé cut inside on Conor Townsend before rifling a left-footed shot from the edge of the box to the near top corner just past Sam Johnstone. A third goal nearly came just before the hour mark, as another low cross from Saka was unable to be converted by both Gabriel Martinelli and Smoth Rowe. In the sixty-seventh minute, a cross from Kieran Tierney managed to only find Townsend, who immediately rushed forward out of defense and passed to Pereira near the center circle. Pereira continued to run downfield, holding off Dani Ceballos and Mohamed Elneny, and just as Gabriel was about to put in a tackle just outside the box, he hit a low shot to the far post just past Leno. The Gunners' third goal would finally come in the ninetieth minute from a 25-yard Willian free kick; this was Willian's first goal for Arsenal in 25 league games and in 37 games overall. While the 3–1 result saw Arsenal hang on to the slim chance of European football next season, it was more impactful for West Brom, as the loss saw the team officially relegated and manager Sam Allardyce's record of never being relegated broken.

Arsenal faced London rivals Chelsea at the Stamford Bridge on 12 May. From a statistics perspective, Chelsea dominated the game. The Blues had more than double the percentage of possession, and outshot the Gunners 19 to 5, with five and two shots on target, respectively. In the first half alone, Chelsea had eight shots, compared to Arsenal's two. However, of those two shots, one was on target, and this would be the difference maker in the game. In the eleventh minute, Kai Havertz intercepted a backpass from Gabriel to Pablo Marí to set up a one-on-one with Bernd Leno, but the ensuing shot was skied over the bar. Four minutes later, however, Arsenal were able to capitalize on a similar mistake from Chelsea. As Chelsea tried to play out from the back, Jorginho, under pressure from Emile Smith Rowe, attempted to pass back to goalkeeper Kepa. However, because Kepa was out to the left of his goal, he had to scramble back to prevent the pass from rolling into the open net, barely managing to bat the ball off the line at full stretch. The rebound fell to Pierre-Emerick Aubameyang, who centered it for Smith Rowe to score his second Premier League goal in as many games. Chelsea continued their offensive barrage well into the second half, when they looked to have grabbed an equalizer. Mason Mount's corner in the sixty-first minute was headed onwards by Havertz to the back post for Christian Pulisic, who made a darting run behind the Arsenal defense, to redirect into the net with his chest from close range. However, VAR review found Pulisic to be clearly offside on Havertz's header, and the goal was disallowed. Just before stoppage time, Chelsea again came close to scoring, but the equalizer was not there: Kurt Zouma's header from Hakim Ziyech's looping cross was tipped onto the crossbar by Leno, and former Arsenal striker Olivier Giroud followed up by also smashing the crossbar with the rebound. The 1–0 win saw Arsenal move up to eighth and within a point of North London rivals Tottenham Hotspur, though the latter still had a game in hand. Notably, this was the first time Arsenal completed the double over Chelsea since the 2003–04 Invincibles season.

In Arsenal's final away game of the 2020–21 Premier League season, they headed across town to Selhurst Park in south London to take on Crystal Palace. This match saw the return of fans, though not at full capacity, and Eagles manager Roy Hodgson's last home game before retirement. The first half hour saw barely any threatening shots from either side until the thirty-second minute, when Christian Benteke headed the ball down for Jeffrey Schlupp to try a volley from just outside the box, which forced Bernd Leno to make a diving fingertip save to his left. A few minutes later, after several passes down the left flank between Bukayo Saka and Kieran Tierney, the latter sent in a cross that found Nicolas Pépé, who made a late run into the box to volley the ball in and give Arsenal the lead. A brief physical incident between Benteke and Saka later in the first half saw the former and Mohamed Elneny, who had come to Saka's defense, each get a yellow card from referee Anthony Taylor. Just after the hour mark, Andros Townsend whipped a free kick into the box, where it was headed in by Benteke to draw Crystal Palace even. However, the Gunners would spoil the occasion with a pair of stoppage time goals to take the win. Just as the game entered stoppage time, Martin Ødegaard's lofted cross floated over a leaping Gary Cahill to find fellow Gunners substitute Gabriel Martinelli, who ran around the back of the Eagles defence, got to the ball ahead of Joel Ward, lifted the ball over the reach of goalkeeper Vicente Guaita with his first touch, and tapped the ball in with his second. In the final seconds of the game, Calum Chambers sent a long throw-in towards Pierre-Emerick Aubameyang, who headed the ball down into the path of Nicolas Pépé. Pépé surged forward into the box and held off Cahill and James Tomkins before firing a low shot that went in at the far post before Guaita could get down to make a save. The match ended 3–1 to Arsenal, keeping their slim chances of European football alive ahead of the final matchday.

For the season ending match, Arsenal hosted Brighton and Hove Albion at the Emirates Stadium on 23 May, with a limited number of fans being allowed in the Emirates for the first time in 2021 and the first time all season since 13 December. The first half was goalless, though the Gunners had several close chances. The first shot from Thomas Partey went just wide of the post, while his second shot later on was tipped over by Robert Sánchez. Thirty minutes in, a Martin Ødegaard corner was flicked on by Partey to Rob Holding, who poked the ball just over the line before a clearance from Ben White, but Holding was found to be offside on Partey's header. Near halftime, Granit Xhaka's lofted pass found Gabriel at the far post, but the ensuing header hit off the top of the crossbar. In the second half, the deadlock was finally broken in the forty-ninth minute. Arsenal moved the ball from the left flank to the right flank with a series of passes that ended with Calum Chambers fizzing a low cross into the box for Nicolas Pépé. Pépé controlled the ball before firing in a half-volley with his second touch, and eleven minutes later, he would double his tally and increase Arsenal's lead. Ødegaard played the ball forward for Pépé down the right flank, who drove into the box and hit a low shot through Lewis Dunk's legs that went in at the near post. In the seventy-second minute, Partey would have another chance to bag his first Arsenal goal but to no avail: after receiving a pass from Xhaka, he quickly turned and rocketed a volley that came off the crossbar. Brighton, with only one shot on target from Jakub Moder all game, failed to seriously threaten the Gunners, enabling Bernd Leno to keep a clean sheet in a 2–0 win.

The final round of matches of the league season kicked-off at the same time, and ninth-placed Arsenal needed several results to go their way in order to secure European football for the 25th consecutive season. Heading into the match, Arsenal needed to win against Brighton and have seventh-placed Tottenham Hotspur and eighth placed Everton, who were both a point ahead, draw or lose in order to leapfrog them into seventh and qualify the newly formed UEFA Europa Conference League. Despite the 2–0 win and Everton's 5–0 smashing at the hands of the champions Manchester City, which saw Arsenal overtake Everton into eighth, a late brace from Gareth Bale saw Tottenham beat Leicester City 4–2 and retain their seventh-place position. As a result, Arsenal missed out on qualifying for any sort of European football for the 2021–22 season, the first time they had done so since 1995. At the end of the season, Alexandre Lacazette finished as Arsenal's top goalscorer with 17 goals (13 in the Premier League), just ahead of Nicolas Pépé on 16 goals and Pierre-Emerick Aubameyang on 15 goals (each with 10 in the Premier League); this was the first time Arsenal had three players with more than 10 Premier League goals in the season since the 2016–17 season. Three players tied for the most assists: Bukayo Saka, Emile Smith Rowe, and Willian each had seven assists across all competitions, though Willian led the way with five assists in the Premier League. Goalkeeper Bernd Leno made the most appearances with 49, of which 35 came in the Premier League.

== Club ==
=== Kits ===
Supplier: Adidas / Sponsor: Emirates / Sleeve sponsor: Visit Rwanda

Home	Away	Away alt.	Away; 2021–22	Third	Goalkeeper 1	Goalkeeper 2	Goalkeeper 3	Goalkeeper 4

== First-team coaching staff ==
Position	Name
Manager	(Spain) Mikel Arteta
Assistant coaches	(Netherlands) Albert Stuivenberg
Assistant coaches	(England) Steve Round
Assistant coaches	(Spain) Carlos Cuesta
Assistant coaches	(Spain) Miguel Molina
Goalkeeping coach	(Spain) Iñaki Caña
Set piece coach	(Sweden) Andreas Georgson

== First-team squad ==
As of 23 May 2021

Note: Flags indicate national team as has been defined under FIFA eligibility rules. Players may hold more than one non-FIFA nationality.

No.	Name	Nat.	Position(s)	Date of birth (age)	Year signed	Signed from	Transfer fee	Apps.	Goals
Goalkeepers
1	Bernd Leno	(Germany)	GK	4 March 1992 (aged 29)	2018	(Germany) Bayer Leverkusen	£19.3m	117	0
13	Rúnar Alex Rúnarsson	(Iceland)	GK	18 February 1995 (aged 26)	2020	(France) Dijon	£1.8m	6	0
33	Mathew Ryan	(Australia)	GK	8 April 1992 (aged 29)	2021	(England) Brighton and Hove Albion	Loan	3	0
Defenders
2	Héctor Bellerín (vice-captain)	(Spain)	RB / RWB	19 March 1995 (aged 26)	2013	(England) Arsenal Academy	N/A	239	9
3	Kieran Tierney	(Scotland)	LB / LWB	5 June 1997 (aged 24)	2019	(Scotland) Celtic	£25m	62	3
6	Gabriel	(Brazil)	CB	19 December 1997 (aged 23)	2020	(France) Lille	£23.14m	32	3
16	Rob Holding (5th captain)	(England)	CB	20 September 1995 (aged 25)	2016	(England) Bolton Wanderers	£2m	117	2
17	Cédric Soares	(Portugal)	RB / RWB	31 August 1991 (aged 29)	2020	(England) Southampton	Free	29	1
21	Calum Chambers	(England)	CB / DM	20 January 1995 (aged 26)	2014	(England) Southampton	£16m	117	4
22	Pablo Marí	(Spain)	CB	31 August 1993 (aged 27)	2020	(Brazil) Flamengo	£7.2m	19	1
23	David Luiz	(Brazil)	CB	22 April 1987 (aged 34)	2019	(England) Chelsea	£8m	73	4
Midfielders
8	Dani Ceballos	(Spain)	CM	25 August 1996 (aged 24)	2019	(Spain) Real Madrid	Loan	77	2
11	Martin Ødegaard	(Norway)	AM / CM	17 December 1998 (aged 22)	2021	(Spain) Real Madrid	Loan	20	2
18	Thomas Partey	(Ghana)	CM / DM	13 June 1993 (aged 28)	2020	(Spain) Atlético Madrid	£45m	33	0
25	Mohamed Elneny	(Egypt)	DM	11 July 1992 (aged 28)	2016	(Switzerland) Basel	£5m	130	5
32	Emile Smith Rowe	(England)	AM / LM	28 June 2000 (aged 21)	2018	(England) Arsenal Academy	N/A	45	7
34	Granit Xhaka (4th captain)	(Switzerland)	CM	27 September 1992 (aged 28)	2016	(Germany) Borussia Mönchengladbach	£34.5m	220	13
Forwards
7	Bukayo Saka	(England)	RW / LW	5 September 2001 (aged 19)	2018	(England) Arsenal Academy	N/A	88	11
9	Alexandre Lacazette (3rd captain)	(France)	ST	28 May 1991 (aged 30)	2017	(France) Lyon	£46.5m	170	65
12	Willian	(Brazil)	RW / AM	9 August 1988 (aged 32)	2020	(England) Chelsea	Free	37	1
14	Pierre-Emerick Aubameyang (captain)	(Gabon)	ST / LW	18 June 1989 (aged 32)	2018	(Germany) Borussia Dortmund	£56m	148	85
19	Nicolas Pépé	(Ivory Coast)	RW	29 May 1995 (aged 26)	2019	(France) Lille	£72m	89	24
24	Reiss Nelson	(England)	RW	10 December 1999 (aged 21)	2017	(England) Arsenal Academy	N/A	47	4
30	Eddie Nketiah	(England)	ST	30 May 1999 (aged 22)	2017	(England) Arsenal Academy	N/A	65	13
35	Gabriel Martinelli	(Brazil)	LW / ST	18 June 2001 (aged 20)	2019	(Brazil) Ituano	£6m	48	12
Players on loan
4	William Saliba	(France)	CB	24 March 2001 (aged 20)	2019	(France) Saint-Étienne	£27m	0	0
11	Lucas Torreira	(Uruguay)	DM	11 February 1996 (aged 25)	2018	(Italy) Sampdoria	£26m	89	4
15	Ainsley Maitland-Niles	(England)	RB / LWB / CM	29 August 1997 (aged 23)	2014	(England) Arsenal Academy	N/A	121	3
27	Konstantinos Mavropanos	(Greece)	CB	11 December 1997 (aged 23)	2018	(Greece) PAS Giannina	£1.8m	8	0
28	Joe Willock	(England)	CM / AM	20 August 1999 (aged 21)	2017	(England) Arsenal Academy	N/A	77	11
29	Matteo Guendouzi	(France)	CM / DM	14 April 1999 (aged 22)	2018	(France) Lorient	£7m	82	1
31	Sead Kolašinac	(Bosnia and Herzegovina)	LB / LWB	20 June 1993 (aged 28)	2017	(Germany) Schalke 04	Free	113	5

== Transfers ==
=== Transfers in ===
Date	Pos.	Name	From	Fee	Team	Ref.
1 July 2020	DF	(Spain) Pablo Marí	(Brazil) Flamengo	£7.2m	First-team	
1 July 2020	DF	(Portugal) Cédric Soares	(England) Southampton	Free transfer	First-team	
14 August 2020	FW	(Brazil) Willian	(England) Chelsea	Free transfer	First-team	
18 August 2020	FW	(Norway) George Lewis	(Norway) Fram Larvik	Free transfer	Under-21s	
19 August 2020	MF	(England) Tim Akinola	(England) Huddersfield Town	Free transfer	Under-21s	
22 August 2020	MF	(Netherlands) Salah-Eddine Oulad M'Hand	(Netherlands) Feyenoord	Free transfer	Under-21s	
24 August 2020	DF	(England) Jonathan Dinzeyi	(England) Tottenham Hotspur	Free transfer	Under-21s	
1 September 2020	DF	(Brazil) Gabriel	(France) Lille	£23.14m	First-team	
21 September 2020	GK	(Iceland) Rúnar Alex Rúnarsson	(France) Dijon	£1.8m	First-team	
5 October 2020	MF	(Ghana) Thomas Partey	(Spain) Atlético Madrid	£45m	First-team	
5 October 2020	FW	(Sweden) Nikolaj Möller	(Sweden) Malmö FF	£450k	Under-21s	
5 October 2020	FW	(Netherlands) Joel Ideho	(Netherlands) Ajax	Undisclosed	Under-21s	
7 January 2021	DF	(Tunisia) Omar Rekik	(Germany) Hertha BSC	£500k	Under-21s	

=== Transfers out ===
Date	Position	Name	To	Fee	Team	Ref.
1 July 2020	RB	(England) Matthew Dennis	(England) Norwich City	Released	Academy	
1 July 2020	CB	(England) Tobi Omole	(England) Tottenham Hotspur	Released	Under-23s	
1 July 2020	LW	(England) Nathan Tormey	Unattached	Released	Under-23s	
1 July 2020	GK	(Portugal) Pedro Virgínia	(Portugal) Porto	Undisclosed	Academy	
1 July 2020	ST	(England) Alfie Matthews	(England) Crystal Palace	Released	Academy	
28 August 2020	ST	(England) Sam Greenwood	(England) Leeds United	£3m	Academy	
1 September 2020	AM	(Armenia) Henrikh Mkhitaryan	(Italy) Roma	Released	First team	
16 September 2020	GK	(Argentina) Emiliano Martínez	(England) Aston Villa	£20m	First team	
8 January 2021	GK	(England) Matt Macey	(Scotland) Hibernian	Undisclosed	First team	
17 January 2021	AM	(Germany) Mesut Özil	(Turkey) Fenerbahçe	Contract terminated	First team	
20 January 2021	CB	(Greece) Sokratis	(Greece) Olympiacos	Contract terminated	First team	
1 February 2021	CB	(Germany) Shkodran Mustafi	(Germany) Schalke 04	Contract terminated	First team	

=== Loans in ===
Date	Position	Name	From	End date	Team	Ref.
4 September 2020	CM	(Spain) Dani Ceballos	(Spain) Real Madrid	End of season	First team	
22 January 2021	GK	(Australia) Mathew Ryan	(England) Brighton & Hove Albion	End of season	First team	
27 January 2021	MF	(Norway) Martin Ødegaard	(Spain) Real Madrid	End of season	First team	

=== Loans out ===
Date	Position	Name	To	End date	Team	Ref.
16 July 2020	CB	(Greece) Konstantinos Mavropanos	(Germany) VfB Stuttgart	End of season	First team	
10 August 2020	CB	(England) Zech Medley	(England) Gillingham	13 January 2021	Under-23s	
10 August 2020	RB	(England) Zak Swanson	(Netherlands) MVV Maastricht	1 December 2020	Under-23s	
13 August 2020	RW	(England) Trae Coyle	(England) Gillingham	13 January 2021	Under-23s	
17 August 2020	CM	(England) Matt Smith	(England) Swindon Town	1 February 2021	Under-23s	
25 August 2020	RB	(England) Jordi Osei-Tutu	(Wales) Cardiff City	End of season	Under-23s	
4 September 2020	DM	(England) Ben Sheaf	(England) Coventry City	End of season	Under-23s	
8 September 2020	ST	(England) Tyreece John-Jules	(England) Doncaster Rovers	End of season	Under-23s	
22 September 2020	CB	(Republic of Ireland) Mark McGuinness	(England) Ipswich Town	End of season	Under-23s	
5 October 2020	CB	(Northern Ireland) Daniel Ballard	(England) Blackpool	End of season	Under-23s	
5 October 2020	CM	(France) Matteo Guendouzi	(Germany) Hertha BSC	End of season	First team	
5 October 2020	DM	(Uruguay) Lucas Torreira	(Spain) Atlético Madrid	End of season	First team	
8 October 2020	GK	(North Macedonia) Dejan Iliev	(England) Shrewsbury Town	28 January 2021	Under-23s	
8 October 2020	DF	(England) Tolaji Bola	(England) Rochdale	31 January 2021	Under-23s	
16 October 2020	DF	(England) Harry Clarke	(England) Oldham Athletic	End of season	Under-23s	
17 October 2020	MF	(England) James Olayinka	(England) Southend United	End of season	Under-23s	
17 October 2020	GK	(England) Tom Smith	(England) Dover Athletic	22 January 2021	Under-23s	
31 December 2020	LB	(Bosnia and Herzegovina) Sead Kolašinac	(Germany) Schalke 04	End of season	First team	
4 January 2021	CB	(France) William Saliba	(France) Nice	End of season	First team	
1 February 2021	CB	(England) Joseph Olowu	(England) Wealdstone	End of season	Under-23s	
1 February 2021	RB	(England) Ainsley Maitland-Niles	(England) West Bromwich Albion	End of season	First team	
1 February 2021	CB	(England) Zech Medley	(Scotland) Kilmarnock	End of season	Under-23s	
1 February 2021	CM	(England) Matt Smith	(England) Charlton Athletic	End of season	Under-23s	
1 February 2021	CM	(England) Joe Willock	(England) Newcastle United	End of season	First team	

1. For an undisclosed loan fee. (~4m)
2. For an undisclosed loan fee.)
3. For an undisclosed loan fee. (~3m)
4. For an undisclosed loan fee. (~1.8m)

=== Transfer summary ===
Spending

Summer: ▼£ Undisclosed (~ 81,590,000)

Winter: £ 0

Total: ▼£ Undisclosed (~ 81,590,000)

Income

Summer: ▲£ Undisclosed (~ 28,025,000)

Winter: £ 0

Total: ▲£ Undisclosed (~ 28,025,000)

Net Expenditure

Summer: ▼£ Undisclosed (~ 53,565,000)

Winter: £ 0

Total: ▼£ Undisclosed (~ 53,565,000)

== Pre-season and friendlies ==
Win Draw Loss Fixtures

25 August 2020 Friendly	Milton Keynes Dons	1–4	Arsenal	Milton Keynes
18:00 BST (UTC+1)	Holding 31' (o.g.)	Report	Elneny 5'; Nketiah 10'; McGuinness 76'; Nelson 85' (pen.)	Stadium: Stadium MK; Referee: Dean Whitestone

5 September 2020 Friendly	Arsenal	2–3	Aston Villa	London
15:00 BST	Aubameyang (pen.)	Report	Douglas Luiz; J. Ramsey	Stadium: Emirates Stadium; Attendance: 0

== Competitions ==
=== Overview ===
Competition	First match	Last match	Starting round	Final position	Record							
Competition	First match	Last match	Starting round	Final position	Pld	W	D	L	GF	GA	GD	Win %
Premier League	12 September 2020	23 May 2021	Matchday 1	8th	38	18	7	13	55	39	+16	47.37
FA Cup	9 January 2021	23 January 2021	Third round	Fourth round	2	1	0	1	2	1	+1	50.00
EFL Cup	21 September 2020	22 December 2020	Third round	Quarter-finals	3	1	1	1	3	4	−1	33.33
FA Community Shield	29 August 2020		Final	Winners	1	0	1	0	1	1	+0	0.00
UEFA Europa League	22 October 2020	6 May 2021	Group stage	Semi-finals	14	9	3	2	33	13	+20	64.29
Total					58	29	12	17	94	58	+36	50.00

Last updated: 23 May 2021
Source: Soccerway

=== Premier League ===
==== League table ====
Pos	Team	Pld	W	D	L	GF	GA	GD	Pts	Qualification or relegation
6	West Ham United	38	19	8	11	62	47	+15	65	Qualification for the Europa League group stage (Note: Since the winners of the 2020–21 FA Cup, Leicester City, also qualified for the Europa League based on league position, the second Europa League group stage berth allocated to England was transferred to the sixth-placed team.)
7	Tottenham Hotspur	38	18	8	12	68	45	+23	62	Qualification for the Europa Conference League play-off round (Note: Since the winners of the 2020–21 EFL Cup, Manchester City, qualified for European competition based on league position, the Europa Conference League berth awarded to the EFL Cup winners was transferred to the highest-placed Premier League team not already qualified for European competition, the seventh-placed team.)
8	Arsenal	38	18	7	13	55	39	+16	61	
9	Leeds United	38	18	5	15	62	54	+8	59	
10	Everton	38	17	8	13	47	48	−1	59	

Source: Premier League
Rules for classification: 1) Points; 2) Goal difference; 3) Goals scored; 4) If the champions, relegated teams or qualified teams for UEFA competitions cannot be determined by rules 1 to 3, rules 4.1 to 4.3 are applied – 4.1) Points gained in head-to-head record between such teams; 4.2) Away goals scored in head-to-head record between such teams; 4.3) Play-offs

==== Results summary ====
Overall								Home						Away					
Pld	W	D	L	GF	GA	GD	Pts	W	D	L	GF	GA	GD	W	D	L	GF	GA	GD
38	18	7	13	55	39	+16	61	8	4	7	24	21	+3	10	3	6	31	18	+13

Last updated: 23 May 2021.
Source: Premier League

==== Results by round ====
Round	1	2	3	4	5	6	7	8	9	10	11	12	13	14	15	16	17	18	19	20	21	22	23	24	25	26	27	28	29	30	31	32	33	34	35	36	37	38
Ground	A	H	A	H	A	H	A	H	A	H	A	H	H	A	H	A	A	H	H	A	H	A	A	H	H	A	A	H	A	H	A	H	H	A	H	A	A	H
Result	W	W	L	W	L	L	W	L	D	L	L	L	D	L	W	W	W	D	W	W	D	L	L	W	L	W	D	W	D	L	W	D	L	W	W	W	W	W
Position	1	3	5	4	5	11	9	11	12	14	15	15	15	15	15	13	11	11	10	9	10	10	11	10	11	10	10	10	9	10	9	9	10	9	9	9	9	8
Points	3	6	6	9	9	9	12	12	13	13	13	13	14	14	17	20	23	24	27	30	31	31	31	34	34	37	38	41	42	42	45	46	46	49	52	55	58	61

Updated to match(es) played on 23 May 2021. Source: Premier league
A = Away; H = Home; W = Win; D = Draw; L = Loss

==== Matches ====
The league fixtures were announced on 20 August 2020.

12 September 2020 1	Fulham	0–3	Arsenal	Fulham
12:30 BST (UTC+1)	Hector (yellow card) 26'; Cairney (yellow card) 61'	Report	Lacazette 8'; Aubameyang (yellow card) 39', (goal) 57'; Gabriel 49'; Bellerín (yellow card) 55'	Stadium: Craven Cottage; Attendance: 0 Referee: Chris Kavanagh

19 September 2020 2	Arsenal	2–1	West Ham United	Holloway, London
20:00 BST (UTC+1)	Lacazette 25'; Nketiah 86'	Report	Fredericks (yellow card) 40'; Antonio 45'	Stadium: Emirates Stadium; Attendance: 0 Referee: Michael Oliver

28 September 2020 3	Liverpool	3–1	Arsenal	Liverpool
20:00 BST (UTC+1)	Mané (yellow card) 3', (goal) 28'; Robertson 34'; Alexander-Arnold (yellow card) 49'; Jota 88'	Report	Lacazette 25'; Bellerín (yellow card) 68'; Ceballos (yellow card) 72'	Stadium: Anfield; Attendance: 0 Referee: Craig Pawson

4 October 2020 4	Arsenal	2–1	Sheffield United	Holloway, London
14:00 BST (UTC+1)	Saka 61'; Pépé 64'	Report	Berge (yellow card) 38'; McGoldrick 84'	Stadium: Emirates Stadium; Attendance: 0 Referee: Lee Mason

17 October 2020 5	Manchester City	1–0	Arsenal	Manchester
17:30 BST (UTC+1)	Rodri (yellow card) 14'; Sterling 23'; Cancelo (yellow card) 63'; Dias (yellow card) 68'; Aké (yellow card) 84'	Report	Partey (yellow card) 90+4'	Stadium: City of Manchester Stadium; Attendance: 0 Referee: Chris Kavanagh

25 October 2020 6	Arsenal	0–1	Leicester City	Holloway, London
19:15 GMT (UTC±0)	Bellerín (yellow card) 30'; Lacazette (yellow card) 58'; Xhaka (yellow card) 90+5'	Report	Fuchs (yellow card) 32'; Tielemans (yellow card) 41'; Fofana (yellow card) 52'; Maddison (yellow card) 67'; Evans (yellow card) 74'; Vardy 80'	Stadium: Emirates Stadium; Attendance: 0 Referee: Craig Pawson

1 November 2020 7	Manchester United	0–1	Arsenal	Manchester
16:30 GMT (UTC±0)	Fred (yellow card) 22'; Greenwood (yellow card) 71'; Maguire (yellow card) 90+4'	Report	Holding (yellow card) 25'; Gabriel (yellow card) 27'; Aubameyang 69' (pen.), (yellow card) 87'	Stadium: Old Trafford; Attendance: 0 Referee: Mike Dean

8 November 2020 8	Arsenal	0–3	Aston Villa	Holloway, London
19:15 GMT (UTC±0)		Report	Saka 25' (o.g.); Watkins 72', 75'	Stadium: Emirates Stadium; Attendance: 0 Referee: Martin Atkinson

22 November 2020 9	Leeds United	0–0	Arsenal	Leeds
16:30 GMT (UTC±0)	Dallas (yellow card) 15'; Cooper (yellow card) 86'; Phillips (yellow card) 90+3'	Report	Pépé (red card) 51'	Stadium: Elland Road; Attendance: 0 Referee: Anthony Taylor

29 November 2020 10	Arsenal	1–2	Wolverhampton Wanderers	Holloway, London
19:15 GMT (UTC±0)	Gabriel 30'; Bellerín (yellow card) 69'; Holding (yellow card) 86'; Tierney (yellow card) 90+2'	Report	Neto 27'; Podence 42'; Boly (yellow card) 47'; Traoré (yellow card) 54'; Silva (yellow card) 56'; Coady (yellow card) 89'	Stadium: Emirates Stadium; Attendance: 0 Referee: Michael Oliver

6 December 2020 11	Tottenham Hotspur	2–0	Arsenal	Tottenham
16:30 GMT (UTC±0)	Son 13'; Lo Celso (yellow card) 41'; Kane 45+1'	Report	Xhaka (yellow card) 75'; Lacazette (yellow card) 80'	Stadium: Tottenham Hotspur Stadium; Attendance: 2,000; Referee: Martin Atkinson

13 December 2020 12	Arsenal	0–1	Burnley	Holloway, London
19:15 GMT (UTC±0)	Xhaka (red card) 58'; Bellerín (yellow card) 71'; Elneny (yellow card) 73'	Report	Brady (yellow card) 33'; Aubameyang 73' (o.g.)	Stadium: Emirates Stadium; Attendance: 2,000; Referee: Graham Scott

16 December 2020 13	Arsenal	1–1	Southampton	Holloway, London
18:00 GMT (UTC±0)	Ceballos (yellow card) 44'; Aubameyang 52'; Gabriel (yellow card) 58' (yellow-red card) 62'	Report	Walcott 18'; Bednarek (yellow card) 26'; Bertrand (yellow card) 33'; Ings (yellow card) 83'	Stadium: Emirates Stadium; Attendance: 0 Referee: Paul Tierney

19 December 2020 14	Everton	2–1	Arsenal	Liverpool
17:30 GMT (UTC±0)	Holding 22' (o.g.); Mina 45'; Calvert-Lewin (yellow card) 90+3'	Report	Elneny (yellow card) 15'; Pépé 35' (pen.); Tierney (yellow card) 40'; Willock (yellow card) 90+1'	Stadium: Goodison Park; Attendance: 2,000; Referee: Andre Marriner

26 December 2020 15	Arsenal	3–1	Chelsea	Holloway, London
17:30 GMT (UTC±0)	Marí (yellow card) 16'; Lacazette 34' (pen.); Xhaka 44'; Saka 56'; Tierney (yellow card) 83'	Report	Thiago Silva (yellow card) 73'; Abraham 85'; Jorginho (penalty missed) 90+1	Stadium: Emirates Stadium; Attendance: 0 Referee: Michael Oliver

29 December 2020 16	Brighton & Hove Albion	0–1	Arsenal	Falmer
18:00 GMT (UTC±0)	Dunk (yellow card) 59'; Jahanbakhsh (yellow card) 65'	Report	Lacazette 66'	Stadium: Falmer Stadium; Attendance: 0 Referee: Martin Atkinson

2 January 2021 17	West Bromwich Albion	0–4	Arsenal	West Bromwich
20:00 GMT (UTC±0)	Gallagher (yellow card) 70'	Report	Tierney 23'; Saka 28'; Bellerín (yellow card) 41'; Lacazette 61', 64'; Ceballos (yellow card) 87'	Stadium: The Hawthorns; Attendance: 0 Referee: Martin Atkinson

14 January 2021 18	Arsenal	0–0	Crystal Palace	Holloway, London
20:00 GMT (UTC±0)	David Luiz (yellow card) 67'	Report	Tomkins (yellow card) 42'	Stadium: Emirates Stadium; Attendance: 0 Referee: Andre Marriner

18 January 2021 19	Arsenal	3–0	Newcastle United	Holloway, London
20:00 GMT (UTC±0)	Aubameyang 50', 77'; Saka 60'	Report		Stadium: Emirates Stadium; Attendance: 0 Referee: David Coote

26 January 2021 20	Southampton	1–3	Arsenal	Southampton
20:15 GMT (UTC±0)	Armstrong 3'; Watts (yellow card) 90'	Report	Pépé 8', (yellow card) 70'; Bellerín (yellow card) 19'; Saka 39'; Lacazette 72'	Stadium: St Mary's Stadium; Attendance: 0 Referee: Kevin Friend

30 January 2021 21	Arsenal	0–0	Manchester United	Holloway, London
17:30 GMT (UTC±0)	Cédric (yellow card) 13'	Report	Wan-Bissaka (yellow card) 51'; Pogba (yellow card) 73'; Maguire (yellow card) 76'	Stadium: Emirates Stadium; Attendance: 0 Referee: Michael Oliver

2 February 2021 22	Wolverhampton Wanderers	2–1	Arsenal	Wolverhampton
18:00 GMT (UTC±0)	Moutinho (yellow card) 13', (goal) 49'; Kilman (yellow card) 28'; Neves 45+5' (pen.), (yellow card) 48'	Report	Pépé 32'; Partey (yellow card) 41'; David Luiz (red card) 45+3'; Xhaka (yellow card) 62'; Leno (red card) 72'	Stadium: Molineux; Attendance: 0 Referee: Craig Pawson

6 February 2021 23	Aston Villa	1–0	Arsenal	Aston
12:30 GMT (UTC±0)	Watkins 2'; Konsa (yellow card) 31'; Nakamba (yellow card) 35'; Grealish (yellow card) 90+6'	Report	Partey (yellow card) 52'; Xhaka (yellow card) 90+4'	Stadium: Villa Park; Attendance: 0 Referee: Chris Kavanagh

14 February 2021 24	Arsenal	4–2	Leeds United	Holloway, London
16:30 GMT (UTC±0)	Aubameyang 13', 41' (pen.), 47'; Bellerín 45'	Report	Struijk 58', (yellow card) 71'; Costa 69'; Dallas (yellow card) 90+6'	Stadium: Emirates Stadium; Attendance: 0 Referee: Stuart Attwell

21 February 2021 25	Arsenal	0–1	Manchester City	Holloway, London
16:30 GMT (UTC±0)	Xhaka (yellow card) 53'; Bellerín (yellow card) 87'	Report	Sterling 2'; Silva (yellow card) 51'; Cancelo (yellow card) 64'	Stadium: Emirates Stadium; Attendance: 0 Referee: Jonathan Moss

28 February 2021 26	Leicester City	1–3	Arsenal	Leicester
12:00 GMT (UTC±0)	Tielemans 6', (yellow card) 72'; Thomas (yellow card) 38'	Report	David Luiz 39'; Lacazette 45+2' (pen.); Pépé 52'; Tierney (yellow card) 90+3'	Stadium: King Power Stadium; Attendance: 0 Referee: Paul Tierney

6 March 2021 27	Burnley	1–1	Arsenal	Burnley
12:30 GMT (UTC±0)	Wood 39'; Pieters (yellow card) 71'	Report	Aubameyang 6'; Saka (yellow card) 55'	Stadium: Turf Moor; Attendance: 0 Referee: Andre Marriner

14 March 2021 28	Arsenal	2–1	Tottenham Hotspur	Holloway, London
16:30 GMT (UTC±0)	Ødegaard 44'; Lacazette 64' (pen.); Xhaka (yellow card) 82'	Report	Lamela 33', (yellow card) 69' (yellow-red card) 76'; Reguilón (yellow card) 40'; Sánchez (yellow card) 63'	Stadium: Emirates Stadium; Attendance: 0 Referee: Michael Oliver

21 March 2021 29	West Ham United	3–3	Arsenal	Stratford, London
15:00 GMT (UTC±0)	Lingard 15'; Bowen 17'; Souček 32'; Coufal (yellow card) 59'; Antonio (yellow card) 88'; Cresswell (yellow card) 89'	Report	Souček 38' (o.g.); Dawson 61' (o.g.); Lacazette 82', (yellow card) 90+3'	Stadium: London Stadium; Attendance: 0 Referee: Jonathan Moss

3 April 2021 30	Arsenal	0–3	Liverpool	Holloway, London
20:00 BST (UTC+1)	Gabriel (yellow card) 90+1'	Report	Jota 64', 82', (yellow card) 73'; Salah 68'	Stadium: Emirates Stadium; Attendance: 0 Referee: Stuart Attwell

11 April 2021 31	Sheffield United	0–3	Arsenal	Sheffield
19:00 BST (UTC+1)	Ampadu (yellow card) 90+4'	Report	Lacazette 33', 85'; Martinelli 71'; Marí (yellow card) 80'	Stadium: Bramall Lane; Attendance: 0 Referee: Peter Bankes

18 April 2021 32	Arsenal	1–1	Fulham	Holloway, London
13:30 BST (UTC+1)	Nketiah 90+7'	Report	Andersen (yellow card) 50'; Maja 59' (pen.); Reid (yellow card) 61'; Areola (yellow card) 89'	Stadium: Emirates Stadium; Attendance: 0 Referee: Craig Pawson

23 April 2021 33	Arsenal	0–1	Everton	Holloway, London
20:00 BST (UTC+1)	Partey (yellow card) 38'	Report	Allan (yellow card) 55'; Holgate (yellow card) 63'; Delph (yellow card) 68'; Leno 76' (o.g.)	Stadium: Emirates Stadium; Attendance: 0 Referee: Jonathan Moss

2 May 2021 34	Newcastle United	0–2	Arsenal	Newcastle upon Tyne
14:00 BST (UTC+1)	Almirón (yellow card) 31'; Fernández (yellow card) 62'; Schär (red card) 90'	Report	Elneny 5'; Xhaka (yellow card) 20'; Aubameyang 66'	Stadium: St. James' Park; Attendance: 0 Referee: Mike Dean

9 May 2021 35	Arsenal	3–1	West Bromwich Albion	Holloway, London
19:00 BST (UTC+1)	Smith Rowe 29'; Pépé 35'; Ceballos (yellow card) 70'; Willian 90'	Report	Robson-Kanu (yellow card) 61'; Pereira 67'; Gallagher (yellow card) 76'	Stadium: Emirates Stadium; Attendance: 0 Referee: Peter Bankes

12 May 2021 36	Chelsea	0–1	Arsenal	Fulham
19:45 BST (UTC+1)		Report	Smith Rowe 16'; Partey (yellow card) 90+4'	Stadium: Stamford Bridge; Attendance: 0 Referee: Andre Marriner

19 May 2021 37	Crystal Palace	1–3	Arsenal	Selhurst
19:00 BST (UTC+1)	Schlupp (yellow card) 5'; Benteke (yellow card) 37', (goal) 62'	Report	Pépé 35', 90+5'; Elneny (yellow card) 37'; Martinelli 90+1'	Stadium: Selhurst Park; Attendance: 6,500; Referee: Anthony Taylor

23 May 2021 38	Arsenal	2–0	Brighton & Hove Albion	Holloway, London
16:00 BST (UTC+1)	Pépé 49', 60'	Report		Stadium: Emirates Stadium; Attendance: 10,000; Referee: Jonathan Moss

=== FA Cup ===
9 January 2021 Third round	Arsenal	2–0 (a.e.t.)	Newcastle United	Holloway, London
17:30 GMT	Cédric (yellow card) 45+1'; Smith Rowe (yellow card) 90+4', (goal) 109'; Aubameyang 117'	Report	Lascelles (yellow card) 9'; Carroll (yellow card) 26'; Clark (yellow card) 90+1'; Hayden (yellow card) 90+1'	Stadium: Emirates Stadium; Attendance: 0 Referee: Chris Kavanagh

23 January 2021 Fourth round	Southampton	1–0	Arsenal	Southampton
12:15 GMT	Gabriel 24' (o.g.); Stephens (yellow card) 56'; Bertrand (yellow card) 83'	Report		Stadium: St Mary's Stadium; Attendance: 0 Referee: Peter Bankes

=== EFL Cup ===
23 September 2020 Third round	Leicester City	0–2	Arsenal	Leicester
19:45 BST		Report	Elneny (yellow card) 13'; Fuchs 57' (o.g.); Nketiah 90'	Stadium: King Power Stadium; Attendance: 0 Referee: Peter Bankes

1 October 2020 Fourth round	Liverpool	0–0 (4–5 p)	Arsenal	Liverpool
19:45 BST	Minamino (yellow card) 15'; Wilson (yellow card) 75'	Report	Xhaka (yellow card) 51'; Cédric (yellow card) 90+2'	Stadium: Anfield; Attendance: 0 Referee: Kevin Friend
	Penalties
	Milner (penalty scored); Wijnaldum (penalty scored); Minamino (penalty scored); Origi (penalty missed); Jones (penalty scored); Wilson (penalty missed)		(penalty scored) Lacazette; (penalty scored) Cédric; (penalty missed) Elneny; (penalty scored) Maitland-Niles; (penalty scored) Pépé; (penalty scored) Willock

22 December 2020 Quarter-finals	Arsenal	1–4	Manchester City	Holloway, London
20:00 GMT	Elneny (yellow card) 23'; Mustafi (yellow card) 25'; Lacazette 31'	Report	Gabriel Jesus 3'; Mahrez 54'; Foden 59'; Silva (yellow card) 65'; Laporte 73'	Stadium: Emirates Stadium; Attendance: 0 Referee: Stuart Attwell

=== FA Community Shield ===
29 August 2020 Final	Arsenal	1–1 (5–4 p)	Liverpool	London
16:30 BST (UTC+1)	Aubameyang 12'	Report	Milner (yellow card) 57'; Minamino 73'	Stadium: Wembley Stadium; Attendance: 0 Referee: Andre Marriner (Birmingham)
	Penalties
	Nelson (penalty scored); Maitland-Niles (penalty scored); Cédric (penalty scored); David Luiz (penalty scored); Aubameyang (penalty scored)		(penalty scored) Salah; (penalty scored) Fabinho; (penalty missed) Brewster; (penalty scored) Minamino; (penalty scored) Jones

=== UEFA Europa League ===
==== Group stage ====
The group stage draw was held on 2 October 2020.

Pos	Team	Pld	W	D	L	GF	GA	GD	Pts	Qualification	ARS	MOL	RW	DUN
1	(England) Arsenal	6	6	0	0	20	5	+15	18	Advance to knockout phase	—	4–1	4–1	3–0
2	(Norway) Molde	6	3	1	2	9	11	−2	10	Advance to knockout phase	0–3	—	1–0	3–1
3	(Austria) Rapid Wien	6	2	1	3	11	13	−2	7		1–2	2–2	—	4–3
4	(Republic of Ireland) Dundalk	6	0	0	6	8	19	−11	0		2–4	1–2	1–3	—

Source: UEFA
Rules for classification: Group stage tiebreakers

22 October 2020 1	Rapid Wien (Austria)	1–2	(England) Arsenal	Vienna, Austria
18:55 CEST (UTC+2)	Grahovac (yellow card) 15'; Fountas 51'; Arase (yellow card) 61'; Kara (yellow card) 63'; Ritzmaier (yellow card) 70'	Report	Lacazette (yellow card) 27'; Partey (yellow card) 35'; Nketiah (yellow card) 38'; David Luiz 70'; Aubameyang 74'; Leno (yellow card) 90+2'	Stadium: Allianz Stadion; Attendance: 3,000; Referee: Pavel Královec (Czech Republic)

29 October 2020 2	Arsenal (England)	3–0	(Republic of Ireland) Dundalk	London, England
20:00 GMT (UTC±0)	Nketiah 42'; Willock 44'; Pépé 46'	Report		Stadium: Emirates Stadium; Attendance: 0 Referee: Filip Glova (Slovakia)

5 November 2020 3	Arsenal (England)	4–1	(Norway) Molde	London, England
20:00 GMT (UTC±0)	Haugen 45+1' (o.g.); David Luiz (yellow card) 58'; Sinyan 62' (o.g.); Pépé 69'; Saka (yellow card) 77'; Willock 88'	Report	Ellingsen 22'	Stadium: Emirates Stadium; Attendance: 0 Referee: Halil Umut Meler (Turkey)

26 November 2020 4	Molde (Norway)	0–3	(England) Arsenal	Molde, Norway
18:55 CET (UTC+1)		Report	Pépé 50'; Nelson 55'; Balogun 83'	Stadium: Aker Stadion; Attendance: 600; Referee: Irfan Peljto (Bosnia and Herzegovina)

3 December 2020 5	Arsenal (England)	4–1	(Austria) Rapid Wien	London, England
20:00 GMT (UTC±0)	Lacazette 10'; Marí 18'; Elneny (yellow card) 42'; Nketiah 44'; Mustafi (yellow card) 61'; Smith Rowe 66'	Report	Ullmann (yellow card) 39'; Kitagawa 47'; Sonnleitner (yellow card) 79'	Stadium: Emirates Stadium; Attendance: 2,000; Referee: Radu Petrescu (Romania)

10 December 2020 6	Dundalk (Republic of Ireland)	2–4	(England) Arsenal	Dublin, Ireland
17:55 GMT (UTC±0)	Boyle (yellow card) 10'; Flores 22'; Mountney (yellow card) 61'; Cleary (yellow card) 70'; Shields (yellow card) 77'; Kelly (yellow card) 82'; Hoare 85'	Report	Nketiah 12'; Elneny 18'; Cédric (yellow card) 28'; Willock (yellow card) 30', (goal) 67'; Balogun 80'	Stadium: Aviva Stadium; Attendance: 0 Referee: Ivan Bebek (Croatia)

==== Knockout phase ====
===== Round of 32 =====
The round of 32 draw was held on 14 December 2020.

18 February 2021 First leg	Benfica (Portugal)	1–1	(England) Arsenal	Rome, Italy
21:00 CET (UTC+1)	Pizzi 55' (pen.)	Report	Smith Rowe (yellow card) 54'; Saka 57'	Stadium: Stadio Olimpico; Attendance: 0 Referee: Cüneyt Çakır (Turkey)
Note: The match, originally to be played at the Estádio da Luz in Lisbon, was moved to the Stadio Olimpico in Rome, due to restrictions imposed by Portugal on travelers from the United Kingdom out of concern of the COVID-19 variant B.1.1.7.

25 February 2021 Second leg	Arsenal (England)	3–2 (4–3 agg.)	(Portugal) Benfica	Piraeus, Greece
18:55 CET (UTC+1)	Aubameyang 21', 87'; Tierney 67'	Report	Taarabt (yellow card) 5'; Gonçalves 43'; Silva 61'	Stadium: Karaiskakis Stadium; Attendance: 0 Referee: Björn Kuipers (Netherlands)
Note: The match, originally to be played at Emirates Stadium in London, was moved to Karaiskakis Stadium in Piraeus, due to restrictions related to the COVID-19 pandemic imposed by the United Kingdom on travelers from Portugal.

===== Round of 16 =====
The round of 16 draw was held on 26 February 2021.

11 March 2021 First leg	Olympiacos (Greece)	1–3	(England) Arsenal	Piraeus, Greece
22:00 EET (UTC+2)	M'Vila (yellow card) 22'; Bouchalakis (yellow card) 37'; El-Arabi 58'	Report	Ødegaard 34'; Gabriel (yellow card) 43', (goal) 79'; Elneny 85'	Stadium: Karaiskakis Stadium; Attendance: 0 Referee: Daniel Siebert (Germany)

18 March 2021 Second leg	Arsenal (England)	0–1 (3–2 agg.)	(Greece) Olympiacos	London, England
17:55 GMT (UTC±0)	Xhaka (yellow card) 86'; Tierney (yellow card) 90+2'	Report	Androutsos (yellow card) 35'; El-Arabi 51'; M'Vila (yellow card) 73'; Ba (yellow card) 82' (yellow-red card) 82'	Stadium: Emirates Stadium; Attendance: 0 Referee: Carlos del Cerro Grande (Spain)

===== Quarter-finals =====
The draw for the quarter-finals was held on 19 March 2021.

8 April 2021 First leg	Arsenal (England)	1–1	(Czech Republic) Slavia Prague	London, England
20:00 BST (UTC+1)	Pépé 86'	Report	Zima (yellow card) 48'; Holeš 90+4'	Stadium: Emirates Stadium; Attendance: 0 Referee: Andreas Ekberg (Sweden)

15 April 2021 Second leg	Slavia Prague (Czech Republic)	0–4 (1–5 agg.)	(England) Arsenal	Prague, Czech Republic
21:00 CEST (UTC+2)	Hromada (yellow card) 20'; Olayinka (yellow card) 63'	Report	Pépé 18'; Lacazette 21' (pen.), 77'; Saka 24'; Martinelli (yellow card) 82'	Stadium: Sinobo Stadium; Attendance: 750; Referee: Cüneyt Çakır (Turkey)

===== Semi-finals =====
The draw for the semi-finals was held on 19 March 2021, after the quarter-final draw. The Gunners' win meant Villarreal's manager Unai Emery would face his former side in the semi final. Emery had guided Arsenal to the final in 2019, possibly his most notable moment during an 18-month stint at Arsenal between May 2018 and November 2019.

29 April 2021 First leg	Villarreal (Spain)	2–1	(England) Arsenal	Villarreal, Spain
21:00 CEST (UTC+2)	Trigueros 5'; Albiol 29'; Torres (yellow card) 37'; Capoue (yellow card) 68' (yellow-red card) 80'	Report	Ceballos (yellow card) 44' (yellow-red card) 57'; Partey (yellow card) 58'; Pépé 73' (pen.); Aubameyang (yellow card) 90'	Stadium: Estadio de la Cerámica; Attendance: 0 Referee: Artur Soares Dias (Portugal)

6 May 2021 Second leg	Arsenal (England)	0–0 (1–2 agg.)	(Spain) Villarreal	London, England
20:00 BST (UTC+1)	Nketiah (yellow card) 90+2'	Report	Pino (yellow card) 86'	Stadium: Emirates Stadium; Attendance: 0 Referee: Slavko Vinčić (Slovenia)

== Statistics ==
=== Appearances and goals ===
Players with no appearances not included in the list.

As of 23 May 2021

No.	Pos.	Nat.	Name	Premier League		FA Cup		EFL Cup		Europa League		Community Shield		Total	
No.	Pos.	Nat.	Name	Apps	Goals	Apps	Goals	Apps	Goals	Apps	Goals	Apps	Goals	Apps	Goals
1	GK	(Germany)	Bernd Leno	35	0	2	0	2	0	10	0	0	0	49	0
2	DF	(Spain)	Héctor Bellerín	24(1)	1	1	0	0(1)	0	6(1)	0	1	0	32(3)	1
3	DF	(Scotland)	Kieran Tierney	26(1)	1	1	0	0	0	4(5)	1	1	0	32(6)	2
6	DF	(Brazil)	Gabriel Magalhães	22(1)	2	1	0	2	0	6	1	0	0	31(1)	3
7	MF	(England)	Bukayo Saka	30(2)	5	0(2)	0	2	0	8(1)	2	1	0	41(5)	7
8	MF	(Spain)	Dani Ceballos	17(8)	0	0	0	2(1)	0	6(6)	0	0	0	25(15)	0
9	FW	(France)	Alexandre Lacazette	22(9)	13	0(2)	0	1(1)	1	5(3)	3	0	0	28(15)	17
11	MF	(Norway)	Martin Ødegaard	9(5)	1	0	0	0	0	5(1)	1	0	0	14(6)	2
12	FW	(Brazil)	Willian	16(9)	1	2	0	0(1)	0	3(6)	0	0	0	21(16)	1
13	GK	(Iceland)	Rúnar Alex Rúnarsson	0(1)	0	0	0	1	0	4	0	0	0	5(1)	0
14	FW	(Gabon)	Pierre-Emerick Aubameyang	26(3)	10	1	1	0	0	5(3)	3	1	1	33(6)	15
16	DF	(England)	Rob Holding	28(2)	0	1	0	2	0	4(1)	0	1	0	36(3)	0
17	DF	(Portugal)	Cédric Soares	8(2)	0	2	0	2	0	7(2)	0	0(1)	0	19(5)	0
18	MF	(Ghana)	Thomas Partey	18(6)	0	0(1)	0	0	0	6(2)	0	0	0	24(9)	0
19	FW	(Ivory Coast)	Nicolas Pépé	16(13)	10	2	0	2(1)	0	10(3)	6	0	0	30(17)	16
21	DF	(England)	Calum Chambers	8(2)	0	0	0	0	0	3(3)	0	0	0	11(5)	0
22	DF	(Spain)	Pablo Marí	10	0	1	0	0	0	5	1	0	0	16	1
23	DF	(Brazil)	David Luiz	17(3)	1	1	0	1	0	7	1	1	0	27(3)	2
24	FW	(England)	Reiss Nelson	0(2)	0	1	0	1	0	3(1)	1	0(1)	0	5(4)	1
25	MF	(Egypt)	Mohamed Elneny	17(6)	1	2	0	2(1)	0	5(7)	2	1	0	27(14)	3
30	FW	(England)	Eddie Nketiah	4(13)	2	1	0	2	1	6(2)	3	1	0	14(15)	6
32	MF	(England)	Emile Smith Rowe	18(2)	2	0(1)	1	0(1)	0	8(3)	1	0	0	26(7)	4
33	GK	(Australia)	Mathew Ryan	3	0	0	0	0	0	0	0	0	0	3	0
34	MF	(Switzerland)	Granit Xhaka	29(2)	1	1(1)	0	1	0	10	0	1	0	42(3)	1
35	FW	(Brazil)	Gabriel Martinelli	7(7)	2	1	0	1	0	0(6)	0	0	0	9(13)	2
38	FW	(England)	Folarin Balogun	0	0	0	0	0(1)	0	0(5)	2	0	0	0(6)	2
41	MF	(England)	Ben Cottrell	0	0	0	0	0	0	0(1)	0	0	0	0(1)	0
66	MF	(England)	Miguel Azeez	0	0	0	0	0	0	0(1)	0	0	0	0(1)	0
Players on loan but featured this season
15	MF	(England)	Ainsley Maitland-Niles	5(6)	0	0(1)	0	2(1)	0	5	0	1	0	13(8)	0
28	MF	(England)	Joe Willock	2(5)	0	1	0	3	0	4(1)	3	0(1)	0	10(7)	3
31	DF	(Bosnia and Herzegovina)	Sead Kolašinac	1	0	0	0	3	0	4	0	0(1)	0	8(1)	0
Players sold but featured this season
20	DF	(Germany)	Shkodran Mustafi	0(3)	0	0	0	1	0	5	0	0	0	6(3)	0
26	GK	(Argentina)	Emiliano Martínez	0	0	0	0	0	0	0	0	1	0	1	0

=== Goalscorers ===
As of 23 May 2021

Rank	No.	Pos.	Nat.	Name	Premier League	FA Cup	EFL Cup	Europa League	Community Shield	Total
1	9	FW	(France)	Alexandre Lacazette	13	0	1	3	0	17
2	19	FW	(Ivory Coast)	Nicolas Pépé	10	0	0	6	0	16
3	14	FW	(Gabon)	Pierre-Emerick Aubameyang	10	1	0	3	1	15
4	7	MF	(England)	Bukayo Saka	5	0	0	2	0	7
5	30	FW	(England)	Eddie Nketiah	2	0	1	3	0	6
6	32	MF	(England)	Emile Smith Rowe	2	1	0	1	0	4
7	6	DF	(Brazil)	Gabriel	2	0	0	1	0	3
7	25	MF	(Egypt)	Mohamed Elneny	1	0	0	2	0	3
7	28	MF	(England)	Joe Willock	0	0	0	3	0	3
10	35	FW	(Brazil)	Gabriel Martinelli	2	0	0	0	0	2
10	3	DF	(Scotland)	Kieran Tierney	1	0	0	1	0	2
10	11	MF	(Norway)	Martin Ødegaard	1	0	0	1	0	2
10	23	DF	(Brazil)	David Luiz	1	0	0	1	0	2
10	38	FW	(England)	Folarin Balogun	0	0	0	2	0	2
15	2	DF	(Spain)	Héctor Bellerín	1	0	0	0	0	1
15	12	FW	(Brazil)	Willian	1	0	0	0	0	1
15	34	MF	(Switzerland)	Granit Xhaka	1	0	0	0	0	1
15	22	DF	(Spain)	Pablo Marí	0	0	0	1	0	1
15	24	FW	(England)	Reiss Nelson	0	0	0	1	0	1
Own Goals					2	0	1	2	0	5
Totals					55	2	3	33	1	94

=== Assists ===
As of 23 May 2021

Rank	No.	Pos.	Nat.	Name	Premier League	FA Cup	EFL Cup	Europa League	Community Shield	Total
1	7	MF	(England)	Bukayo Saka	4	0	0	3	1	8
1	12	FW	(Brazil)	Willian	5	0	0	2	0	7
1	32	MF	(England)	Emile Smith Rowe	4	0	0	3	0	7
4	19	FW	(Ivory Coast)	Nicolas Pépé	1	0	0	4	0	5
5	3	DF	(Scotland)	Kieran Tierney	3	1	0	0	0	4
5	14	FW	(Gabon)	Pierre-Emerick Aubameyang	3	0	0	1	0	4
7	2	DF	(Spain)	Héctor Bellerín	2	0	0	1	0	3
7	8	MF	(Spain)	Dani Ceballos	3	0	0	0	0	3
7	9	FW	(France)	Alexandre Lacazette	2	1	0	0	0	3
7	18	MF	(Ghana)	Thomas Partey	2	0	0	1	0	3
7	21	DF	(England)	Calum Chambers	2	0	0	1	0	3
7	28	MF	(England)	Joe Willock	0	0	0	3	0	3
13	17	DF	(Portugal)	Cedric Soares	1	0	0	1	0	2
13	34	MF	(Switzerland)	Granit Xhaka	2	0	0	0	0	2
13	11	MF	(Norway)	Martin Ødegaard	2	0	0	0	0	2
13	35	FW	(Brazil)	Gabriel Martinelli	1	0	1	0	0	2
16	6	DF	(Brazil)	Gabriel	0	0	0	1	0	1
16	15	MF	(England)	Ainsley Maitland-Niles	0	0	0	1	0	1
16	16	DF	(England)	Rob Holding	1	0	0	0	0	1
16	24	MF	(England)	Reiss Nelson	0	0	0	1	0	1
16	30	FW	(England)	Eddie Nketiah	1	0	0	0	0	1
16	38	FW	(England)	Folarin Balogun	0	0	0	1	0	1
Totals					39	2	1	24	1	67

=== Disciplinary record ===
As of 23 May 2021

Rank	No.	Pos.	Nat.	Name	Premier League		FA Cup		EFL Cup		Europa League		Community Shield		Total	
Rank	No.	Pos.	Nat.	Name	Yellow card	Red card	Yellow card	Red card	Yellow card	Red card	Yellow card	Red card	Yellow card	Red card	Yellow card	Red card
1	34	MF	(Switzerland)	Granit Xhaka	7	1	0	0	1	0	1	0	0	0	9	1
2	8	MF	(Spain)	Dani Ceballos	4	0	0	0	0	0	1	1	0	0	5	1
3	6	DF	(Brazil)	Gabriel	2	1	0	0	0	0	1	0	0	0	3	1
4	23	DF	(Brazil)	David Luiz	1	1	0	0	0	0	1	0	0	0	2	1
5	19	FW	(Ivory Coast)	Nicolas Pépé	1	1	0	0	0	0	0	0	0	0	1	1
5	1	GK	(Germany)	Bernd Leno	0	1	0	0	0	0	1	0	0	0	1	1
6	2	DF	(Spain)	Héctor Bellerín	8	0	0	0	0	0	0	0	0	0	8	0
7	18	MF	(Ghana)	Thomas Partey	5	0	0	0	0	0	2	0	0	0	7	0
8	25	MF	(Egypt)	Mohamed Elneny	3	0	0	0	2	0	1	0	0	0	6	0
9	3	DF	(Scotland)	Kieran Tierney	4	0	0	0	0	0	1	0	0	0	5	0
10	9	FW	(France)	Alexandre Lacazette	3	0	0	0	0	0	1	0	0	0	4	0
10	17	DF	(Portugal)	Cédric Soares	1	0	1	0	1	0	1	0	0	0	4	0
12	14	FW	(Gabon)	Pierre-Emerick Aubameyang	2	0	0	0	0	0	1	0	0	0	3	0
13	16	DF	(England)	Rob Holding	2	0	0	0	0	0	0	0	0	0	2	0
13	28	MF	(England)	Joe Willock	1	0	0	0	0	0	1	0	0	0	2	0
13	20	DF	(Germany)	Shkodran Mustafi	0	0	0	0	1	0	1	0	0	0	2	0
13	22	DF	(Spain)	Pablo Mari	2	0	0	0	0	0	0	0	0	0	2	0
13	30	FW	(England)	Eddie Nketiah	0	0	0	0	0	0	2	0	0	0	2	0
18	32	MF	(England)	Emile Smith Rowe	0	0	1	0	0	0	0	0	0	0	1	0
Totals					27	3	2	0	5	0	9	0	0	0	43	4

=== Clean sheets ===
As of 23 May 2021

Rank	No.	Pos.	Name	Nat.	Premier League	FA Cup	EFL Cup	Europa League	Community Shield	Total
1	1	GK	Bernd Leno	(Germany)	11	1	2	2	0	16
2	13	GK	Rúnar Alex Rúnarsson	(Iceland)	0	0	0	2	0	2
3	33	GK	Mathew Ryan	(Australia)	1	0	0	0	0	1
Total					12	1	2	4	0	19

== Awards ==
Each award winner was chosen via open-access polls on the club's official website.

=== Arsenal Player of the Month award ===
Month	Player	Votes	Ref
September	Gabriel Magalhães (BRA)	72%	
October	Gabriel Magalhães (BRA)	79%	
November	Gabriel Magalhães (BRA)	76%	
December	Bukayo Saka (ENG)	70%	
January	Bukayo Saka (ENG)	46%	
February	Bukayo Saka (ENG)	48%	
March	Martin Ødegaard (NOR)	53.4%	
April	Alexandre Lacazette (FRA)	72%	

=== Arsenal Goal of the Month award ===
Month	Player	Competition	Opponent	Votes	Ref
September	Pierre-Emerick Aubameyang (GAB)	Premier League	Fulham	40%	
October	Nicolas Pépé (CIV)	UEFA Europa League	Dundalk	38%	
November	Vivianne Miedema (NED)	FA Women's League Cup	London City Lionesses		
December	Bukayo Saka (ENG)	Premier League	Chelsea		
January	Kieran Tierney (SCO)	Premier League	West Bromwich Albion		
February	Nicolas Pépé (CIV)	Premier League	Wolverhampton Wanderers	28.1%	
March	Martin Ødegaard (NOR)	UEFA Europa League	Olympiacos	38.4%	
April	Alexandre Lacazette (FRA)	Premier League	Sheffield United	32%	

=== Arsenal Player of the Season award ===
Arsenal Player of the Season
Rank	Player	Votes	Ref
1st	Bukayo Saka (ENG)	51%	
2nd	Nicolas Pépé (CIV)	15%	
3rd	Kieran Tierney (SCO)	14%	

=== Arsenal Goal of the Season award ===
Rank	Player	Competition	Opponent	Votes	Ref
1st	Mohamed Elneny (EGY)	UEFA Europa League	Dundalk	31%	
2nd	Kieran Tierney (SCO)	Premier League	West Bromwich Albion	21%	
3rd	Nicolas Pépé (CIV)	Premier League	West Bromwich Albion	13%	
