= Eddie Nketiah =

English footballer (born 1999)

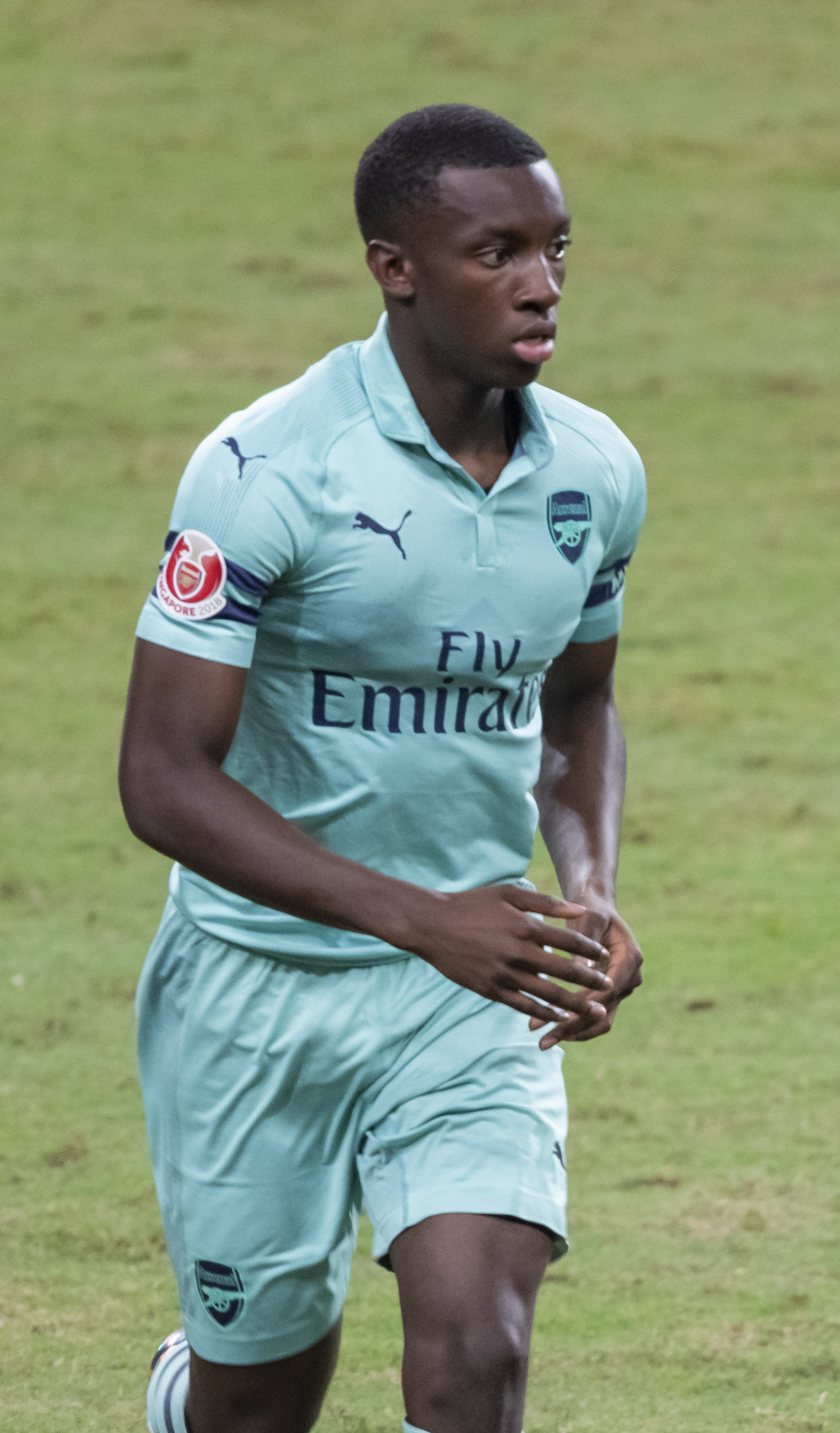
- Nketiah playing for Arsenal in 2018

Personal information
- Full name: Edward Keddar Nketiah
- Date of birth: 30 May 1999 (age 27)
- Place of birth: Lewisham, Greater London, England
- Height: 5 ft 9 in (1.75 m)
- Position: Striker

Team information
- Current team: Crystal Palace
- Number: 9

Youth career
- 2008–2015: Chelsea
- 2015–2017: Arsenal

Senior career*
Years	Team	Apps	(Gls)
2017–2024	Arsenal	116	(19)
2019–2020	→ Leeds United (loan)	17	(3)
2024–	Crystal Palace	50	(6)

International career
2017	England U18	2	(4)
2017–2018	England U19	10	(9)
2018–2019	England U20	9	(6)
2018–2021	England U21	17	(16)
2023	England	1	(0)
- * Club domestic league appearances and goals as of 19:26, 8 November 2026 (UTC)

Edward Keddar Nketiah (born 30 May 1999) is an English professional footballer who plays as a striker for Premier League club Crystal Palace. He has played once for the England national team.

Nketiah started his club career in the Chelsea youth academy until his release aged, after which he joined the Arsenal academy, making his senior debut in 2017. After a loan to Leeds United in their 2019–20 Championship-winning season, he went on to make over 150 appearances for Arsenal, winning the FA Cup in 2020. In 2024, he was signed by Crystal Palace, winning a second FA Cup in 2025.

Nketiah represented England across various youth levels, holding the record for most goals for the England U21s, and made his senior debut in 2023.

== Early life ==
Edward Keddar Nketiah was born on 30 May 1999 in Lewisham, Greater London, to Ghanaian parents and was raised in Deptford.

== Club career ==
=== Early career ===
Nketiah started his career with Chelsea after being scouted at the age of nine while playing for south-east London Sunday team Hillyfielders. He was released by Chelsea in 2015.

=== Arsenal ===
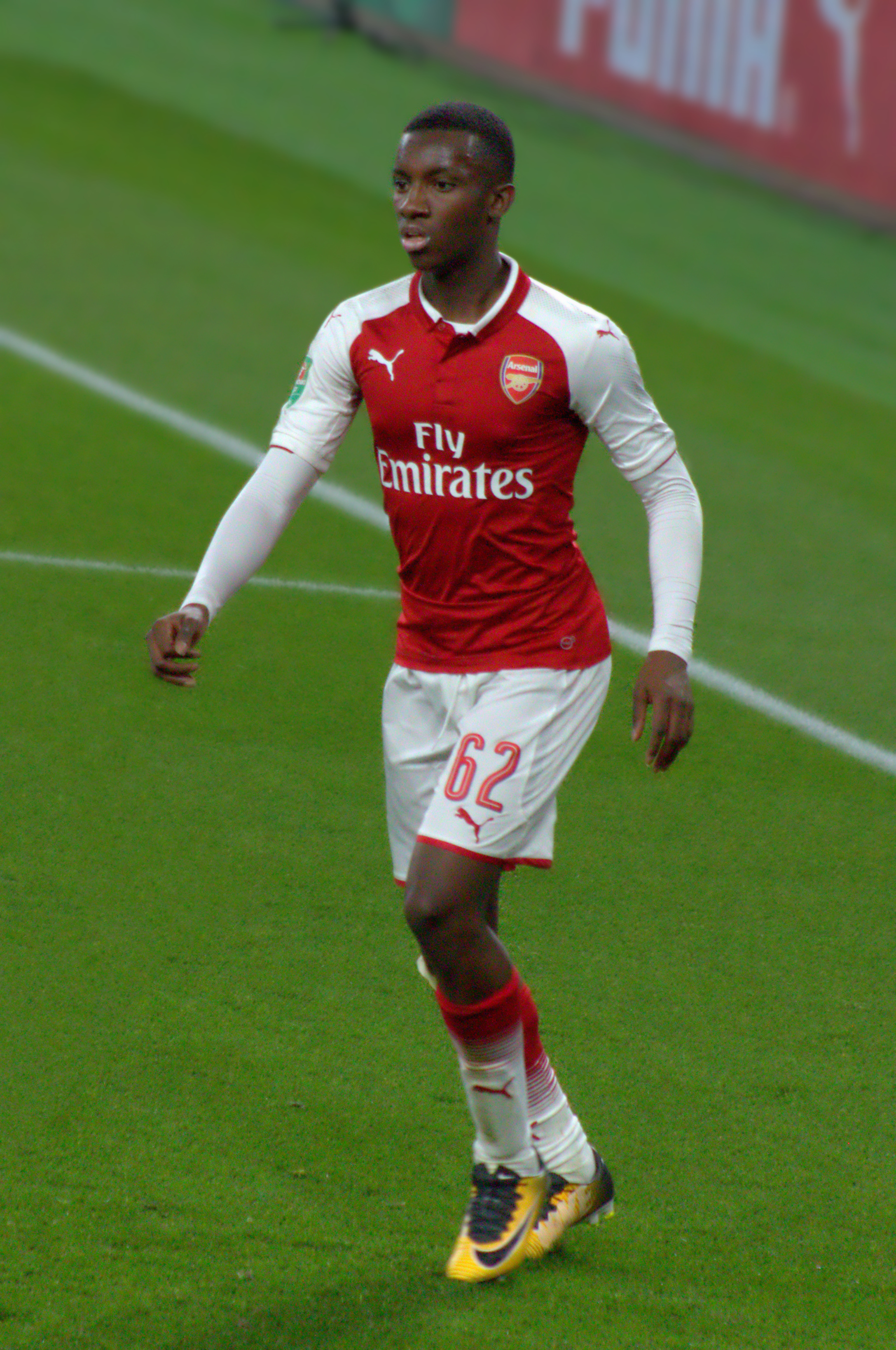
Nketiah playing for Arsenal in 2017

Nketiah joined the Arsenal Academy after leaving Chelsea and played for the club at youth levels. During the 2016–17 season, Nketiah scored 15 goals in 16 appearances for the under-18 team while also scoring 12 goals in 26 appearances for the under-23s. After that season, Nketiah was called up by Arsène Wenger for the first team's pre-season trip to Australia and China.

On 28 September 2017, Nketiah was called up to the first team for Arsenal's UEFA Europa League match against BATE Borisov. He came on as an 89th-minute substitute for Joe Willock as Arsenal won 4–2. His next appearance came nearly a month later against Norwich City in the EFL Cup as an 85th-minute substitute. He scored after 15 seconds with his first touch to tie the match, adding another in extra time to win it for Arsenal. Nketiah was set for a loan move to Bundesliga club FC Augsburg in January 2019 transfer window, but due to an injury to Danny Welbeck, Nketiah stayed at Arsenal.

Nketiah scored his first goal in the Premier League on the last day of the season away to Burnley on 12 May 2019. He was an unused substitute in the UEFA Europa League final 4–1 defeat against Chelsea on 29 May, receiving a runners-up medal.

==== Loan to Leeds United ====
On 8 August 2019, Nketiah joined Championship club Leeds United on loan for the 2019–20 season. Leeds head coach Marcelo Bielsa described Nketiah upon signing as a "young, important player in English football". He made his debut on 13 August in the EFL Cup against Salford City, scoring his team's first goal during a 3–0 away victory. He scored on his Championship debut the following week, with the only goal in a 1–0 home win over Brentford.

After scoring his fourth goal of the season in Leeds' 2–0 win against Barnsley on 15 September 2019, Bielsa described Nketiah as a "complete player". After being behind Patrick Bamford in the pecking order, Marcelo Bielsa revealed Nketiah would have his chance to become the first-choice striker against Queens Park Rangers, however the day before the match Nketiah picked up a lower abdomen injury, which kept him out of action for one month. He returned on 7 December, as a substitute in Leeds' 2–0 victory against Huddersfield Town. His first league start for Leeds came on 29 December 2019, in a 5–4 victory over Birmingham City. Nketiah also started the next match on 1 January 2020, in what would prove to be his final appearance for Leeds away to West Bromwich Albion in a 1–1 draw. The result kept Leeds on top of the table on goal difference.

Nketiah picked up his first major medal of his career in July 2020 when Leeds United won the Championship title, with his seventeen appearances enough to make him eligible for a winner's medal.

==== Return to Arsenal ====
Nketiah was recalled from his Leeds loan spell early by Arsenal on 1 January 2020. He was in the starting line-up in Arsenal's FA Cup fourth round victory against AFC Bournemouth on 27 January, and scored the second goal as Arsenal won 2–1 away. Nketiah made his first Premier League start at home to Newcastle United, before scoring in the next match against Everton, sliding a volley into the corner. He became a regular in Arsenal's return to league play after the hiatus caused by the COVID-19 pandemic, starting in the team's 3–0 loss away to Manchester City, being replaced in the 67th minute by Alexandre Lacazette. On 7 July, Nketiah received the first red card of his playing career, in a league game against Leicester City. Two weeks later, Nketiah lifted his first major trophy of his career with Arsenal, coming on as a substitute in the 82nd minute in the 2–1 victory over Chelsea in the 2020 FA Cup Final at Wembley Stadium.

On 28 August 2020, Nketiah was in the starting line-up in the 2020 FA Community Shield at Wembley Stadium, where Arsenal beat Liverpool 5–4 in a penalty shoot-out after the match finished 1–1. On 19 September, he came on as a substitute in the 77th minute and scored the late winning goal in a 2–1 win against West Ham United in the Premier League. This was his first goal of the season. Nketiah scored three times in the Europa League group stage, his goals coming in both games against Dundalk and the home game against Rapid Vienna. He finished the season with six goals in all competitions.

Nketiah began the 2021–22 season as backup to Pierre-Emerick Aubameyang and Alexandre Lacazette. He scored in Arsenal's EFL Cup third and fourth round wins against AFC Wimbledon and Leeds United, respectively. On 21 December 2021, he scored the first hat-trick of his career, with three goals in a 5–1 win against Sunderland in the EFL Cup quarter-finals. Following Aubameyang's departure in February, He was given a regular place in the starting line-up towards the end of the season, and scored five goals in Arsenal's last seven Premier League matches. These included a brace against Chelsea in a 4–2 win at Stamford Bridge, and another brace against Leeds. Nketiah ended the season with ten goals: five in the EFL Cup and five in the Premier League. On 18 June 2022, he signed a new contract with Arsenal until June 2027.

Despite Alexandre Lacazette leaving the club, Nketiah found himself back on the substitutes' bench following the signing of Gabriel Jesus. However, he started all six of Arsenal's Europa League group games and scored twice, in wins over Zürich and Bodø/Glimt, as Arsenal topped Group A. He made his 100th first-team appearance for Arsenal in their win at Brentford on 18 September 2022. He got a lengthy run in the team when Gabriel Jesus was ruled out for a few months after picking up a knee injury in Brazil's 2022 FIFA World Cup game against Cameroon. On 26 December, he made his first Premier League start of the season when the competition resumed following the World Cup, scoring in Arsenal's 3–1 win against West Ham. On 22 January 2023, he scored twice, including the match-winning goal in the last minute of Arsenal's 3–2 victory over Manchester United, to become the second Arsenal player to score a winner in the 90th minute against their rivals, after Thierry Henry in January 2007.

Nketiah started and opened the scoring in Arsenal's 2–1 win against Nottingham Forest on the opening weekend of the 2023–24 Premier League season on 12 August 2023. Arsenal manager Mikel Arteta described him as "a role model", adding that he was impressed with his attitude in training. On 3 October, he made his UEFA Champions League debut, coming off the bench in the second half of a 2–1 away defeat against Lens. On 28 October, he scored his first Premier League hat-trick in a 5–0 home victory over Sheffield United. On 12 December, Nketiah made his first Champions League start against PSV Eindhoven, scoring his first goal of the competition as Arsenal left the Philips Stadion with a 1–1 draw.

=== Crystal Palace ===
On 30 August 2024, Nketiah joined fellow Premier League side Crystal Palace for a reported fee of £25 million plus £5 million in add-ons. He signed a five-year deal with the club and was assigned the number 9 shirt, which was previously worn by Jordan Ayew. He made his debut for the club in a 2–2 league home draw against Leicester City on 14 September. On 17 September, he scored his first goal for Palace in a 2–1 win over Queens Park Rangers in the third round of the EFL Cup. On 18 December, he scored against his former club Arsenal in a 3–2 loss at the Emirates Stadium in the quarter-finals of the same competition. On 25 February 2025, Nketiah scored his first Premier League goal for Palace in a 4–1 win over Aston Villa. He came on as a second-half substitute as Palace defeated Manchester City in the 2025 FA Cup final on 17 May, winning their first ever major trophy and Nketiah's second FA Cup title.

Having missed the start of the 2025–26 season, including Palace's 2025 FA Community Shield win, through injury, Nketiah scored his first goal of the season on 27 September 2025, coming on as a substitute for Ismaïla Sarr and scoring a 97th-minute winning goal in a 2–1 win over Liverpool to hand them their first loss of the season, as well as extending Palace's unbeaten run and moving them into third place after six games. In his following game, Nketiah scored his first European goal for Palace in a 2–0 away win over Dynamo Kyiv in the UEFA Conference League, further extending Palace's unbeaten run to a club-record 19 games.

== International career ==
Nketiah is eligible for both England and Ghana at international level. He made his international debut for England at under-19 level, playing a match against Saudi Arabia on 22 March 2017, in which he scored the second goal for England in the 58th minute as they won 2–0. In his next match, against Qatar, Nketiah scored three goals as England won 4–0. In November 2017, Nketiah scored four goals for the England under-19 team in a qualifier for the 2018 UEFA European Under-19 Championship against the Faroe Islands. He was one of a number of players withdrawn from selection for the tournament by their club.

Nketiah received his first call up to the England under-21 team for the 2018 Toulon Tournament. He scored twice in the semi-final against Scotland and provided the assist for Kieran Dowell to score the winning goal against Mexico in the final.

In January 2019, Nketiah reportedly turned down a call up from the Ghana national team, favouring England. In September 2020, he captained England under-21s for the first time and scored a hat-trick during a 6–0 victory over Kosovo.

On 7 October 2020, Nketiah equalled Alan Shearer's goalscoring record of 13 for the under-21s by scoring in a 3–3 draw against Andorra. Nketiah went on to break that record with the second goal of a 2–1 win over Turkey at Molineux Stadium on 13 October 2020; a victory that secured England's place at the 2021 UEFA European Under-21 Championship. Nketiah was ultimately named as England captain for that tournament, which ended with a group stage exit.

On 13 January 2023, Nketiah was belatedly recognised for his achievement in becoming England U21s' record goal scorer with the presentation of a commemorative golden boot by his former coach and The FA representative Michael Johnson.

On 31 August 2023, Nketiah was called up to the senior England squad for the first time for their fixtures against Ukraine and Scotland. However, he was not named in the matchday squad in the former and was an unused substitute in the latter. He made his debut on 13 October as a 73rd-minute substitute in a 1–0 home win over Australia in a friendly.

== Style of play ==
Nketiah is known for his pace and movement, his style has been compared to former Arsenal and Crystal Palace striker Ian Wright. In August 2019 he described Wright as his "mentor".

His playing style was also compared to Jermain Defoe, due to his movement to play off the last defender's shoulder and his sharp shooting ability from all angles. Nketiah can play as a striker or as a wide forward, with Nketiah describing his own playing style as "I'm a striker, I'm brave, I like to put myself in the places where the chances are going to fall."

== Career statistics ==
=== Club ===
As of match played 8 November 2026

Appearances and goals by club, season and competition
Club	Season	League			FA Cup		EFL Cup		Europe		Other		Total	
Club	Season	Division	Apps	Goals	Apps	Goals	Apps	Goals	Apps	Goals	Apps	Goals	Apps	Goals
Arsenal	2017–18	Premier League	3	0	1	0	1	2	5 (Note: Appearances in UEFA Europa League)	0	0	0	10	2
Arsenal	2018–19	Premier League	5	1	1	0	1	0	2	0	—		9	1
Arsenal	2019–20	Premier League	13	2	4	2	—		0	0	—		17	4
Arsenal	2020–21	Premier League	17	2	1	0	2	1	8	3	1 (Note: Appearance in FA Community Shield)	0	29	6
Arsenal	2021–22	Premier League	21	5	1	0	5	5	—		—		27	10
Arsenal	2022–23	Premier League	30	4	2	2	1	1	6	2	—		39	9
Arsenal	2023–24	Premier League	27	5	1	0	2	0	6 (Note: Appearances in UEFA Champions League)	1	1	0	37	6
Arsenal	Total		116	19	11	4	12	9	27	6	2	0	168	38
Arsenal U21	2018–19	—			—		—		—		1 (Note: Appearance in EFL Trophy)	1	1	1
Leeds United (loan)	2019–20	Championship	17	3	—		2	2	—		—		19	5
Crystal Palace	2024–25	Premier League	29	3	5	2	3	2	—		—		37	7
Crystal Palace	2025–26	Premier League	12	2	0	0	2	0	5 (Note: Appearances in UEFA Conference League)	2	0	0	19	4
Crystal Palace	2026–27	Premier League	9	1	0	0	1	1	4	1	—		14	3
Crystal Palace	Total		50	6	5	2	6	3	9	3	0	0	70	14
Career total			183	28	16	6	20	14	36	9	3	1	258	58

=== International ===
Appearances and goals by national team and year
National team	Year	Apps	Goals
England	2023	1	0
Total		1	0

== Honours ==
Leeds United

- EFL Championship: 2019–20

Arsenal

- FA Cup: 2019–20
- FA Community Shield: 2020, 2023
- UEFA Europa League runner-up: 2018–19

Crystal Palace

- FA Cup: 2024–25
- UEFA Conference League: 2025–26

England U21

- Toulon Tournament: 2018
