= 1995 in association football =

The following are the association football events of the year 1995 throughout the world.

== Events ==
- Copa Libertadores 1995: Won by Grêmio after defeating Atlético Nacional on an aggregate score of 4–2.
- January 18 – Guus Hiddink makes his debut as the manager of Netherlands national team with a friendly loss (0–1) against France. Two players make their debut as well: strikers Michael Mols (FC Twente) and Glenn Helder (Vitesse Arnhem).
- January 19 – Dutch club FC Zwolle names former goalkeeper Piet Schrijvers as their new manager to replace Ben Hendriks.
- January 25 – Eric Cantona, in an away match against Crystal Palace, he launched a 'kung-fu' style kick against an abusive Crystal Palace fan, Matthew Simmons, after being sent off by the referee for a tackle on Palace defender Richard Shaw. He then got up from his seat and left, leaving many of the assembled crowd bemused. One month later, he was sentenced to 120 hours of community service after an appeal court overturned a 2-week prison sentence for assault. He was also suspended by The Football Association until the following October.
- February 15 – English soccer hooligans, led by members of Combat 18, riot at Lansdowne Road during a friendly between the Republic of Ireland and England. The match, refereed by Dutchman Dick Jol, is abandoned.
- February 22 – Guus Hiddink loses his first match as the new head coach of the Netherlands national team; Portugal defeats the Netherlands in Eindhoven through a goal by Pedro Barbosa.
- March 29 – Bryan Roy plays his last international match for the Netherlands national team, earning his 32nd cap against Malta.
- May 20 – Everton claims the English FA Cup with a 1–0 win over Manchester United.
- May 24 – UEFA Champions League won by Ajax Amsterdam after defeating A.C. Milan in the Ernst Happel Stadium through a goal from Patrick Kluivert.
- June 7 – John van 't Schip plays his last international match for the Netherlands national team, earning his 41st cap against Belarus, while goalkeeper Edwin van der Sar makes his debut in the Euro 1996 qualifying match in Minsk.
- June 18 – In 2nd edition of FIFA Women's World Cup, Norway wins 2–0 over Germany with goals from Hege Riise and Marianne Pettersen.
- August 16 – Ajax Amsterdam once again claims the Dutch Super Cup, the annual opening of the new season in the Eredivisie, this time by a 2–1 win in extra-time over Feyenoord Rotterdam.
- October 2 – Feyenoord Rotterdam fires manager Willem van Hanegem and names Arie Haan as his successor.
- November 20 – Manager Ronald Spelbos is fired by Dutch club Vitesse Arnhem and replaced by Frans Thijssen.
- November 28 – Ajax Amsterdam wins the Intercontinental Cup in Tokyo, Japan by defeating Brazil's Grêmio after penalties: 4–3. The decisive penalty is scored by skipper Danny Blind.
- December 8 – Dutch club NEC Nijmegen fires Cees van Kooten and appoints Wim Koevermans.
- December 12 – The Lebanese national team beat Slovakia national football team 2 – 1 in a friendly match in Beirut.
- December 13 – The Netherlands national team qualifies for Euro 1996 by defeating the Republic of Ireland (2–0) in a play-off at Anfield Road, Liverpool. Both goals are scored by Patrick Kluivert.
- December 15 – The European Court of Justice makes the Bosman ruling, which means all footballers not under contract are free to move clubs without any economic compensation to their former club. A secondary result of the ruling means the abolition of the foreign player quotas, at least as they affect nationals of European Union member states.
- December 15 – Korean club Suwon Samsung Bluewings is officially founded.

== Winner club national championships ==
=== Asia ===
- Japan – Yokohama F. Marinos
- Qatar – Al-Rayyan SC
- South Korea – Ilhwa Chunma

=== Europe ===
- Croatia – Hajduk Split
- England – Blackburn Rovers
- Finland - Haka Valkeakoski
- France – FC Nantes
- Germany – Borussia Dortmund
- Italy – Juventus
- Netherlands – Ajax Amsterdam
- Portugal – FC Porto
- Scotland – Rangers
- Spain – Real Madrid
- Turkey – Beşiktaş
- Ukraine – Dynamo Kyiv
- (Serbia and Montenegro) Yugoslavia – Red Star Belgrade

=== North America ===
- Mexico – Necaxa
- United States / Canada – Seattle Sounders (APSL)

=== South America ===
- Argentina
  - Clausura – San Lorenzo
  - Apertura – Vélez Sársfield
- Bolivia – San José
- Brazil – Botafogo
- Chile – Universidad de Chile
- Paraguay – Olimpia Asunción
- Peru – Sporting Cristal

== International tournaments ==
- FIFA Women's World Cup in Sweden
  1. Norway
  2. Germany
  3. United States
- Baltic Cup in Riga, Latvia
  1. Latvia
  2. Lithuania
  3. Estonia
- Canada Cup in Edmonton, Canada
  1. Chile
  2. Canada
  3. Northern Ireland
- Copa América in Uruguay
  1. Uruguay
  2. Brazil
  3. Colombia
- Pan American Games in Mar del Plata, Argentina
  1. Argentina
  2. Mexico
  3. Colombia
- FIFA U-20 World Cup in Qatar
  1. Argentina
  2. Brazil
  3. Portugal
- FIFA U-17 World Championship in Ecuador
  1. Ghana
  2. Brazil
  3. Argentina
- UNCAF Nations Cup in San Salvador, El Salvador
  1. Honduras
  2. Guatemala
  3. El Salvador

== Births ==
- 3 January: Muhammed Demirci, Turkish footballer
- 4 January:
  - Muhammad Tahir, Indonesian footballer
  - Adam Webster, English footballer
- 5 January: Konstantinos Beglektsis, Greek footballer
- 15 January: Sinan Bytyqi, Albanian footballer
- 20 January: Sergi Samper, Spanish footballer
- 30 January: Marcos Llorente, Spanish footballer
- 5 February: Hampus Bergdahl, Swedish footballer
- 7 February: Shani Tarashaj, Swiss footballer
- 8 February:
  - Joshua Kimmich, German footballer
  - Zakarie Labidi, French footballer
- 14 February: Diego Fagúndez, Uruguayan footballer
- 18 February: Nathan Aké, Dutch footballer
- 19 February: Karmen Ulbin, Slovenian footballer
- 6 March: Utam Rusdiana, Indonesian footballer
- 7 March: Akermann Silva, Venezuelan-born Chilean footballer
- 13 March
  - Héctor Bellerín, Spanish footballer
  - Evan Dimas, Indonesian footballer
- 25 March: Nataniel de Jesus Reis, East Timorese footballer
- 9 April: Nathalie Gonzalez, former Luxembourgish footballer
- 5 May: Javi Forján, Spanish footballer
- 27 May: Felipe Ribeiro, Brazilian footballer
- 1 June: Carlos Castro García, Spanish footballer
- 16 June: Saifoudine Sanali, Comorian footballer
- 23 June: Kristopher Vida, Hungarian footballer
- 25 June: Andriy Markovych, Ukrainian footballer
- 1 July
  - James Hamon, Guernsey-born footballer
  - Ryuji Utomo, Indonesian footballer
- 2 July: James Davis, Equatoguinean footballer
- 5 July: Baily Cargill, English footballer
- 6 July:
  - Robert Obst, Polish footballer
  - Mario López Quintana, Paraguayan footballer
- 11 July:
  - Hamza Ould Jawar, Mauritanian footballer
  - Nikita Khaykin, Israeli footballer
  - Vitali Lystsov, Russian footballer
- 12 July: Bernard Donovan, Zimbabwean footballer
- 15 July: Bully Drammeh, Gambian footballer
- 27 July: Konrad Szczotka, Polish footballer
- 4 August: Maiky Fecunda, Curaçaoan footballer
- 8 August: Gandelger Ganbold, Mongolian footballer
- 10 August: Felipe Saturnino, Brazilian footballer
- 12 August: Roman Artemuk, Ukrainian footballer
- 21 August:
  - Everton Pereira, Brazilian footballer
  - Vanessa Wahlen, German footballer
- 23 August: Gafur Gulberdiyev, Turkmen footballer
- 24 August: Yves Nyami, DR Congolese footballer
- 10 September: Jack Grealish, English footballer
- 13 September: Luka Špoljarić, Serbian footballer
- 15 September: David Raya, Spanish footballer
- 18 September:
  - Max Meyer, German footballer
  - Matt Targett, English footballer
- 21 September: Giuseppe Ponsat, Italian footballer
- 3 October: Simonas Stankevičius, Lithuanian footballer
- 5 October: Marina Lukić, Bosnian footballer
- 9 October: Kenny Tete, Dutch footballer
- 15 October: Larissa Šoronda, Slovenian footballer
- 1 November: Marco Palermo, Italian footballer
- 20 November: Théo Bongonda, Belgian footballer
- 7 December: Santi Mina, Spanish footballer
- 8 December: Jordon Ibe, English footballer
- 12 December: Emmanuel Saban Laryea, Ghanaian footballer

== Deaths ==
=== February ===
- February 23 – Sergio Bertoni, Italian striker, winner of the 1938 FIFA World Cup. (79)

=== March ===
- March 20 - Werner Liebrich, German international footballer (born 1927)

=== April ===
- April 22 – Carlo Ceresoli, Italian goalkeeper, winner of the 1938 FIFA World Cup. (84)

=== May ===
- May 6 – Noel Brotherston (38), Northern Irish footballer
- May 30 – Ted Drake (83), English footballer
- May 30 – Bobby Stokes (44), English footballer

=== August ===
- August 29 – Billy Whitaker (71), English professional footballer

=== September ===
- September 15 – Gunnar Nordahl (74), Swedish international footballer
- September 15 – Dirceu, Brazilian midfielder, included in the World Cup All-Star Team at the 1978 FIFA World Cup . (43; car crash)
- September 28 – Albert Johanneson (55), South African footballer

=== October ===
- October 7 – Emanuele Del Vecchio, Brazilian forward, Brazilian squad member at the 1956 South American Championship. (61)

=== December ===
- December 24 – Carlos Lapetra (57), Spanish footballer

== Movies ==
- The Big Green (USA)
