= Everton Pereira =

Everton Pereira may refer to:

- Everton (footballer, born 1979), Everton Antônio Pereira, Brazilian football midfielder
- Everton (footballer, born August 1995), Everton Pereira, Brazilian football right-back for Capital CF
- Everton Pereira (footballer), French football midfielder for Nice
