= Felipe Ribeiro =

Felipe Ribeiro may refer to:

- Felipe Ribeiro (footballer), Brazilian footballer
- Felipe Ribeiro dos Santos, futsal player
- Felipe Borges (handballer) (Felipe Borges Dutra Ribeiro)
