= Calum Chambers =

English footballer (born 1995)

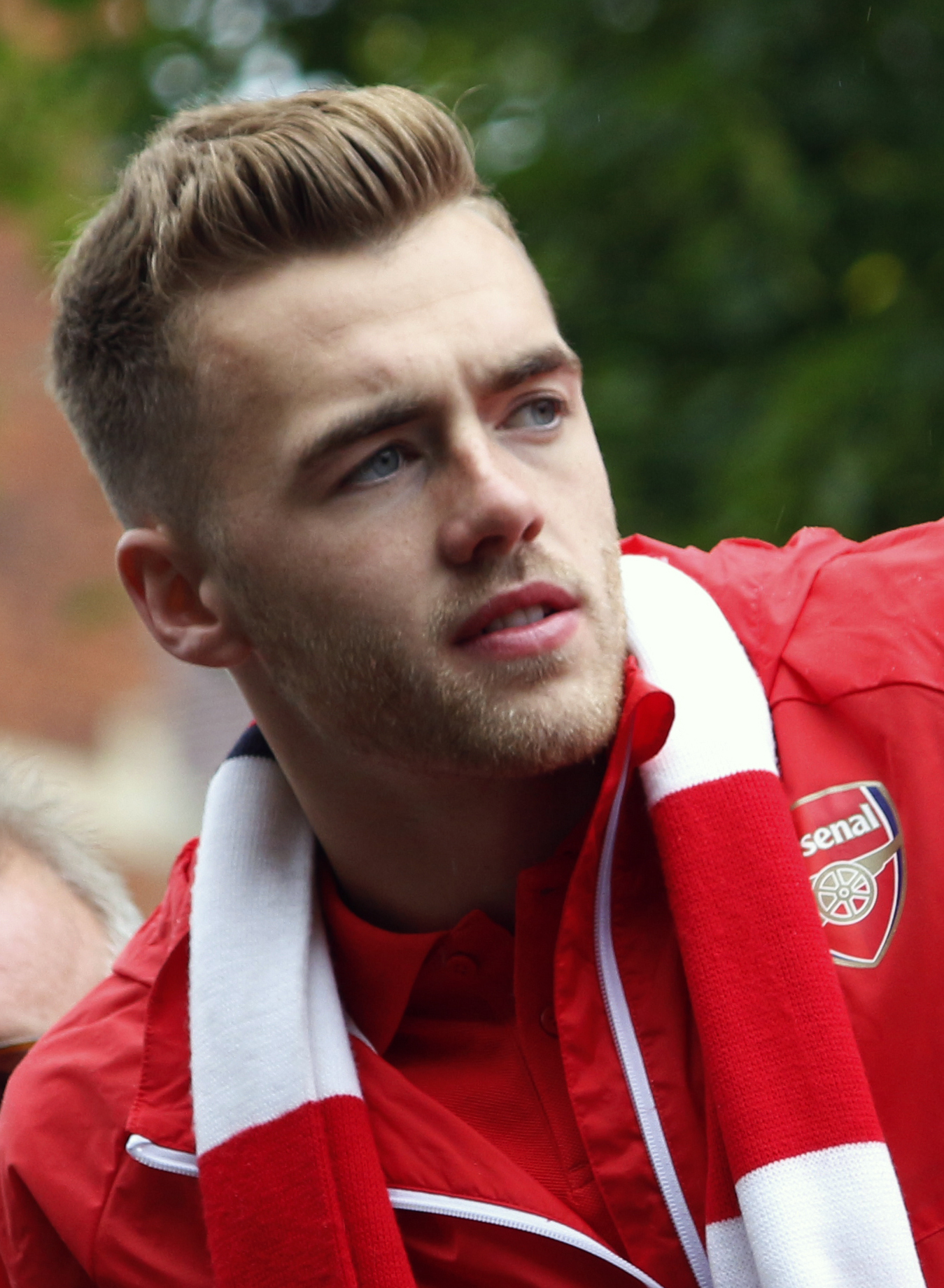
- Chambers in 2015

Personal information
- Full name: Calum Chambers
- Date of birth: 20 January 1995 (age 31)
- Place of birth: Petersfield, Hampshire, England
- Height: 6 ft 0 in (1.82 m)
- Positions: Centre-back; right-back

Team information
- Current team: Cardiff City
- Number: 12

Youth career
- 2002–2012: Southampton

Senior career*
Years	Team	Apps	(Gls)
2012–2014	Southampton	22	(0)
2014–2022	Arsenal	74	(3)
2016–2017	→ Middlesbrough (loan)	24	(1)
2018–2019	→ Fulham (loan)	31	(2)
2022–2024	Aston Villa	30	(1)
2024–	Cardiff City	66	(4)

International career
2012	England U17	6	(3)
2012–2014	England U19	18	(2)
2015–2017	England U21	22	(0)
2014	England	3	(0)
- * Club domestic league appearances and goals as of 12 April 2026 (UTC)

Calum Chambers (born 20 January 1995) is an English professional footballer who plays as a centre-back or right-back for and captains EFL Championship club Cardiff City.

Originally a member of Southampton's academy system, Chambers was promoted to the first team at the beginning of the 2012–13 campaign. After two seasons with the club, he moved to fellow Premier League club Arsenal. Having spent seven seasons at Arsenal, he moved to Aston Villa in January 2022. Chambers joined Cardiff City in July 2024.

Having represented England at various international youth levels, Chambers made three senior international appearances for the England national team in 2014.

== Club career ==
=== Southampton ===
Born in Petersfield, Hampshire, Chambers joined Southampton at the age of seven. He went through the ranks at the club and at the beginning of the 2012–13 season, Chambers was revealed as one of four youth players to be promoted to the first-team. During the pre-season period he made a number of appearances for the team, playing in the Memorial Cup against Anderlecht, coming on as a second-half substitute in the matches against Évian Thonon Gaillard and Étoile Carouge, and making late appearances against Ajax and Wolverhampton Wanderers.

Chambers made his full debut for Southampton on 28 August 2012 in a 4–1 win over Stevenage in the second round of the League Cup, coming on as an 84th-minute substitute for Dean Hammond and providing the assist for the final goal of the match by Ben Reeves.

On 31 July 2013, Chambers signed a new four-year contract with Southampton. He made his first-team league debut on 17 August, when he played the full 90 minutes at right-back of the opening match of the 2013–14 season in a 1–0 win against West Bromwich Albion. He made a total of 25 appearances for Southampton in all competitions, of which 22 were in the league, before leaving in the summer of 2014.

=== Arsenal ===
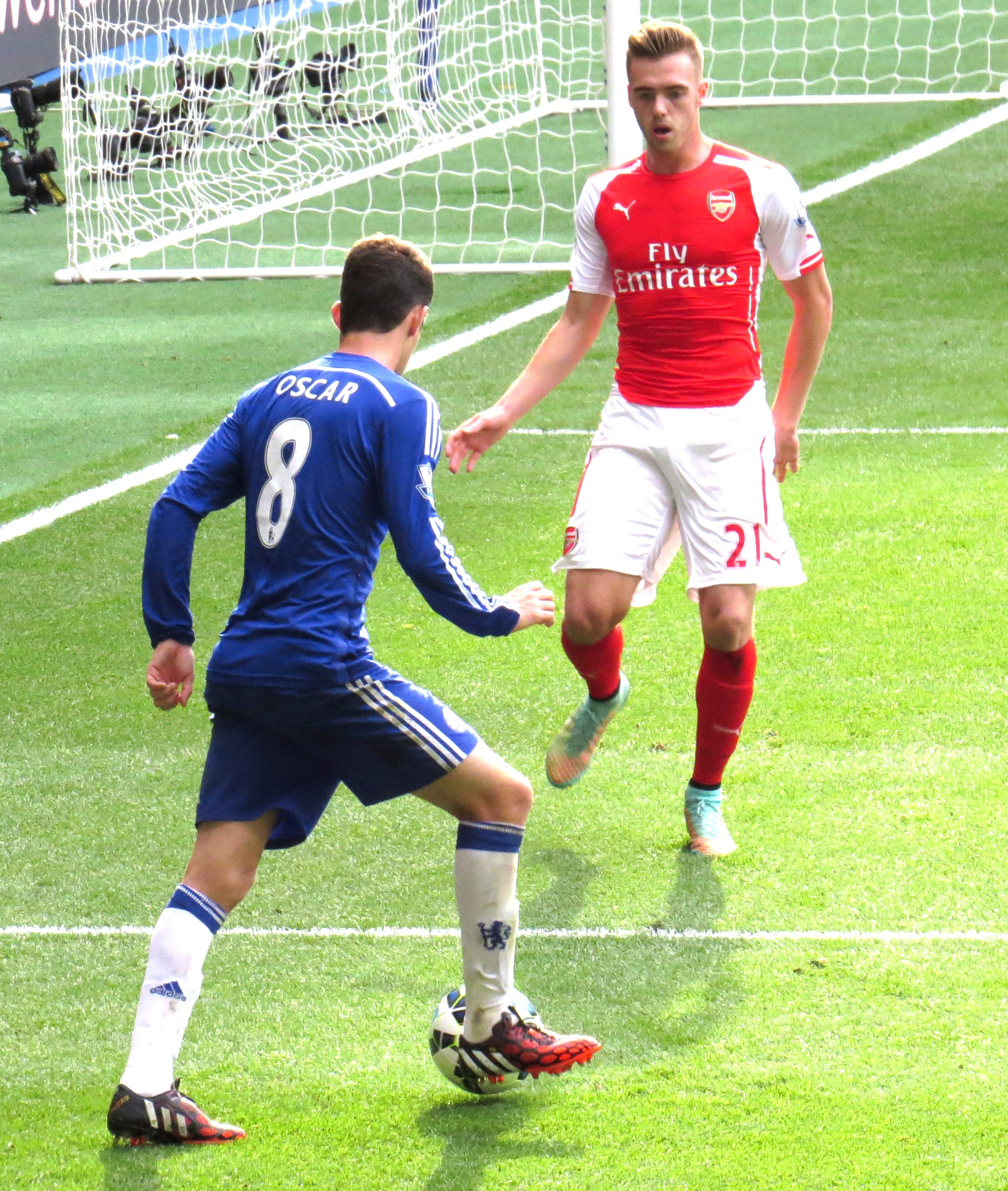
Chambers (right) playing for Arsenal in 2014

On 28 July 2014, it was announced that he had signed for Arsenal on a long-term contract for an undisclosed fee, rising to a potential £16 million with performance-related add-ons.

Chambers made his first appearance for Arsenal on 2 August 2014, starting in central defence in a 5–1 win against Benfica in the pre-season Emirates Cup tournament. On 10 August, Chambers made his competitive debut for Arsenal, playing the full 90 minutes of the 2014 FA Community Shield against Premier League champions Manchester City at Wembley Stadium. Playing at centre-back instead of his usual right-back position to cover for Per Mertesacker, the BBC wrote on his performance against the Premier League champions that "his mature performance defied his youthful years". On 16 August, Chambers played his first Premier League match for Arsenal in a 2–1 win against Crystal Palace. He played the first European fixture of his career three days later, a goalless draw in the first leg of Arsenal's Champions League play-off away to Beşiktaş.

Following a strong start to the season, Chambers was nominated for the 2014 Golden Boy award, alongside international teammates Raheem Sterling, Luke Shaw and John Stones. He scored the first senior goal of his career and registered an assist on 1 November as Arsenal beat Burnley 3–0 in a Premier League home victory. He was sent off for the first time in his career on 6 December, as Arsenal lost 3–2 at Stoke City.

Chambers' appearances in the second half of the season were limited by the emergence of Héctor Bellerín at right-back. He was not in Arsenal's matchday squad when they won the 2015 FA Cup Final 4–0 against Aston Villa at Wembley Stadium on 30 May.

Chambers began the 2016–17 Premier League in the starting line-up for Arsenal and scored in a 3–4 loss against Liverpool in the first match of the season.

==== Loan to Middlesbrough (2016–17 season) ====
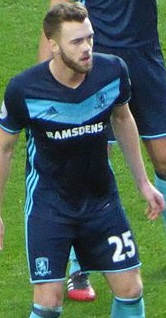
Chambers playing for Middlesbrough in 2016

On 30 August 2016, Chambers joined fellow Premier League team Middlesbrough on a season-long loan. On 24 September 2016, he made his debut in a 2–1 defeat against Tottenham in the league. On 30 April 2017, he scored his only goal for the club in a 2–2 draw against Manchester City. Prior to his return to Arsenal, Chambers was a key figure on the team and made a total of 26 appearances for Middlesbrough.

==== 2017–18 season ====
Chambers made his first appearance of the 2017–18 season in the 1–0 win over Doncaster Rovers in the EFL Cup, but was substituted at half time due to injury.

On 3 July 2018, Chambers signed a new long-term contract with Arsenal.

==== Loan to Fulham (2018–19 season) ====
On 7 August 2018, Chambers signed with fellow Premier League side Fulham on a season long loan. On 11 August, he made his debut in a 2–0 loss against Crystal Palace in the league. He would score his first goal for the club in a 4–2 victory over Brighton on 29 January 2019. Although he had previously always been playing as a centre-back or full-back, Chambers was mostly deployed as a central midfielder during his time at Fulham, and his excellent performances in this new role led to him winning the 2018–19 Fulham Player of the Season award, with 48.4 per cent of the votes—more than three times any other player nominated.

==== 2019–20 season ====
After Fulham's relegation from the Premier League, Chambers returned to Arsenal ahead of the 2019–20 season. He scored his first goal of the season on 22 September 2019, scoring Arsenal's 2nd in a 3–2 victory against Aston Villa. Chambers' goal helped sparked the comeback for 10-man Arsenal, as they rallied from behind twice to pick up all three points. Two days later, on 24 September 2019, Chambers played the full 90-minutes at right-back, providing three assists in Arsenal's 5–0 EFL Cup victory over Nottingham Forest.

On 29 December 2019, Chambers ruptured the anterior cruciate ligament of his left knee in a 2–1 defeat by Chelsea. As a result, he was expected to be out of action for six to nine months.

==== 2020–21 season ====
Chambers made his return to the first team since his injury in a 4–1 win over Rapid Vienna on 3 December 2020. He made his first Premier League start since December 2019 in a 1–1 away draw against Burnley on 6 March 2021. He was in the starting lineup again in a 3–3 draw against West Ham United on 21 March and put in a Man of the Match performance.

=== Aston Villa ===
On 27 January 2022, Chambers joined fellow Premier League club Aston Villa on a free transfer, signing a three-and-a-half-year contract. He made his debut on 9 February, as a late substitute in a 3–3 draw against Leeds United after Ezri Konsa had received a red card. He scored his first goal for the club in a 3–0 win away at Leeds on 10 March. On 12 January 2024, manager Unal Emery said Chambers was free to leave the club.

On 24 February 2024, following an injury to Pau Torres, with Ezri Konsa, Tyrone Mings and Diego Carlos already unavailable through injury, Chambers came off the bench to make his first Premier League appearance since April the previous year - in a 4–2 victory over Nottingham Forest. After the match, Villa manager Unai Emery explained that he had asked Chambers to find a new club in the January transfer window, but Chambers had insisted on staying, with Emery saying that he respected Chambers' desire to regain a place in the Aston Villa first team.

On 12 July 2024, Aston Villa announced that Chambers would depart the club by mutual consent, due to his desire to play more first team football.

=== Cardiff City ===
On 14 July 2024, Chambers was confirmed to have joined Championship side Cardiff City.

Following relegation in his first season, Chambers was named captain on the eve of the 2025–26 season.

== International career ==
Chambers made his debut for the England under-17 team on 2 February against Portugal. In March, he played in all three of the team's matches in the 2012 UEFA European Under-17 Championship elite round, scoring their only goal of the tournament in a 1–0 win over Ukraine.

On 26 September 2012, Chambers made the step up to the England under-19 team, playing the full 90 minutes in the team's 3–0 win over the Estonia under-19 team in the 2013 UEFA European Under-19 Championship qualifying round. On 28 September Chambers came on as a second-half substitute in the England under-19 team's match against the Faroe Islands, which England won 6–0, scoring the final goal of the match in the 84th minute. He scored his second under-19 international goal in a 1–0 victory against Turkey on 21 March 2013.

On 28 August 2014, he was named in the senior England squad for the first time, ahead of a friendly against Norway and a Euro 2016 qualification match against Switzerland in September. He made his debut against Norway on 3 September, coming on for the last 9 minutes in place of John Stones as England won 1–0 at Wembley Stadium. Initially chosen for the under-21 team, Chambers moved into the senior squad ahead of European qualifiers against San Marino and Estonia in October 2014 due to an injury to Stones. He was given his first start on his second cap, against San Marino on 9 October at Wembley Stadium, playing at right-back ahead of his former Southampton teammate Nathaniel Clyne.

Chambers then dropped back down to the under-21 team in March 2015, and made his debut in a 1–0 win against Czech Republic in Prague. He was part of the team that won the 2016 Toulon Tournament, their first such win for 22 years.

On 5 June 2017, Chambers was called up to England's squad for the 2017 UEFA European Under-21 Championship to be held in Poland. Chambers went on to play in the semi-final of the tournament where England went out on penalties to Germany.

== Media ==
Chambers was involved in the Amazon Original sports docuseries All or Nothing: Arsenal, which documented the club by spending time with the coaching staff and players behind the scenes both on and off the field throughout their 2021–22 season.

== Career statistics ==
=== Club ===
As of match played 6 April 2026

Appearances and goals by club, season and competition
Club	Season	League			FA Cup		League Cup		Europe		Other		Total	
Club	Season	Division	Apps	Goals	Apps	Goals	Apps	Goals	Apps	Goals	Apps	Goals	Apps	Goals
Southampton	2012–13	Premier League	0	0	0	0	1	0	—		—		1	0
Southampton	2013–14	Premier League	22	0	0	0	2	0	—		—		24	0
Southampton	Total		22	0	0	0	3	0	—		—		25	0
Arsenal	2014–15	Premier League	23	1	4	0	1	0	7 (Note: Appearances in UEFA Champions League)	0	1 (Note: Appearance in FA Community Shield)	0	36	1
Arsenal	2015–16	Premier League	12	0	5	1	2	0	3	0	0	0	22	1
Arsenal	2016–17	Premier League	1	1	—		—		—		—		1	1
Arsenal	2017–18	Premier League	12	0	0	0	4	0	8 (Note: Appearances in UEFA Europa League)	0	0	0	24	0
Arsenal	2018–19	Premier League	—		—		—		—		—		0	0
Arsenal	2019–20	Premier League	14	1	0	0	1	0	3	0	—		18	1
Arsenal	2020–21	Premier League	10	0	0	0	0	0	6	0	0	0	16	0
Arsenal	2021–22	Premier League	2	0	0	0	3	1	—		—		5	1
Arsenal	Total		74	3	9	1	11	1	27	0	1	0	122	5
Middlesbrough (loan)	2016–17	Premier League	24	1	2	0	—		—		—		26	1
Fulham (loan)	2018–19	Premier League	31	2	1	0	1	0	—		—		33	2
Arsenal U21	2020–21	—			—		—		—		1 (Note: Appearance in EFL Trophy)	0	1	0
Aston Villa	2021–22	Premier League	11	1	—		—		—		—		11	1
Aston Villa	2022–23	Premier League	14	0	1	0	2	0	—		—		17	0
Aston Villa	2023–24	Premier League	5	0	0	0	0	0	3 (Note: Appearances in UEFA Europa Conference League)	0	—		8	0
Aston Villa	Total		30	1	1	0	2	0	3	0	—		36	1
Cardiff City	2024–25	Championship	41	2	1	0	0	0	—		—		42	2
Cardiff City	2025–26	League One	25	2	0	0	5	1	—		1	0	31	3
Cardiff City	2026–27	Championship	0	0	0	0	0	0	—		—		0	0
Cardiff City	Total		66	4	1	0	5	1	—		1	0	73	5
Career total			247	11	14	1	22	2	30	0	3	0	316	14

=== International ===
Appearances and goals by national team and year
National team	Year	Apps	Goals
England	2014	3	0
Total		3	0

== Honours ==
Arsenal

- FA Cup: 2014–15
- FA Community Shield: 2014
- EFL Cup runner-up: 2017–18

England U21

- Toulon Tournament: 2016

Individual

- Fulham Player of the Season: 2018–19
