= Hampus Bergdahl =

Swedish footballer

Personal information
- Full name: Pehr Hampus Bergdahl
- Date of birth: 5 February 1995 (age 31)
- Place of birth: Sweden
- Height: 1.84 m (6 ft 1/2 in)
- Position: Centre back

Team information
- Current team: Team TG
- Number: 18

Youth career
- –2011: Asarums IF
- 2011–2013: Mjällby AIF

College career
Years	Team	Apps	(Gls)
2016–2017	Syracuse University	12	(0)
2018–2019	San Diego State University	22	(0)

Senior career*
Years	Team	Apps	(Gls)
2011	Asarums IF	1	(0)
2011–2015	Mjällby AIF	10	(1)
2015	→ Asarums IF (loan)	9	(1)
2016–2019	Asarums IF	31	(2)
2020–	Team TG	15	(0)
- * Club domestic league appearances and goals as of 14:50, 17 November 2020 (UTC)

Hampus Bergdahl (born 5 February 1995) is a Swedish footballer who plays for Mjällby AIF as a defender. He previously played collegiately in the United States.

== Career ==
=== Club career ===
Bergdahl is a product of Asarums IF FK, which he left for Mjällby AIF at the age of 16 in 2011. Bergdahl made his Allsvenskan debut on 27 July 2014 in a 3-0 win over IFK Göteborg, where he was substituted in the 66th minute.

In July 2015, Bergdahl was loaned out his parent club Asarums IF for the rest of the season. He played nine games and scored a goal for the club in Division 2.

In January 2016, Bergdahl moved to the United States to study at Syracuse University. He played six matches for the university's football team in 2016. During the summer holidays of college education, Bergdahl was back in Asarums IF and played eight matches and scored one goal in Division 2 in 2016.

In January 2020, Bergdahl was recruited by Team TG FF, where he signed a one-year contract with an option for another year.
