= 2019–20 Arsenal F.C. season =

English football club season

Arsenal F.C.
2019–20 season
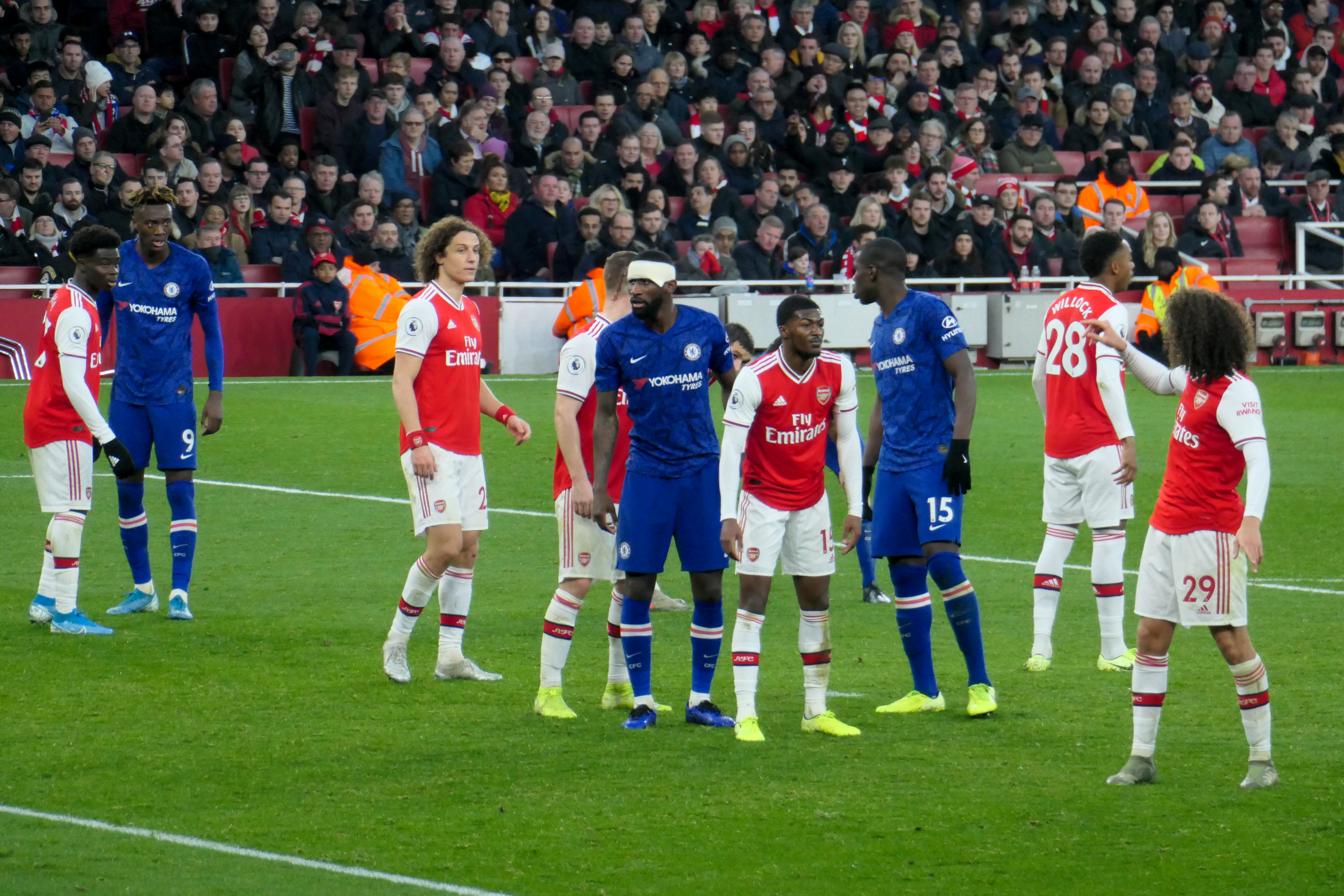
- Arsenal vs Chelsea in December 2019
- Owner: Kroenke Sports & Entertainment
- Chairman: Sir Chips Keswick (until 28 May)
- Head coach: Unai Emery (until 29 November); Freddie Ljungberg (interim, until 20 December); Mikel Arteta (from 20 December)
- Stadium: Emirates Stadium
- Premier League: 8th
- FA Cup: Winners
- EFL Cup: Fourth round
- UEFA Europa League: Round of 32
- Top goalscorer: League: Pierre-Emerick Aubameyang (22); All: Pierre-Emerick Aubameyang (29)
Home colours	Away colours	Third colours

The 2019–20 season was Arsenal's 28th season in the Premier League, their 94th consecutive season in the top flight of English football and 103rd season in the top flight overall. The club participated in the Premier League, FA Cup, EFL Cup and UEFA Europa League.

Despite finishing eighth and enduring one of their most turbulent seasons in modern history, Arsenal ended the season with silverware, winning the FA Cup for a record fourteenth time.

== Review ==
Throughout the summer transfer window, Arsenal completed the signings of forwards Gabriel Martinelli and club-record signing Nicolas Pepe; midfielder Dani Ceballos on a one-year loan; and defenders Kieran Tierney, David Luiz, and William Saliba, the latter of which was sent back to former club AS Saint-Etienne on a one-year loan. What the Arsenal fanbase viewed as lack of budget and ambition from owner Stan Kroenke led many to protest his ownership with the social media hashtag "#WeCareDoYou". Arsenal released first-team players Stephan Lichtsteiner, Aaron Ramsey, and Danny Welbeck, sold David Ospina, Takuma Asano, Laurent Koscielny, Carl Jenkinson, Alex Iwobi, and Nacho Monreal, and loaned out Eddie Nketiah, Mohamed Elneny, Henrikh Mkhitaryan, Emile Smith Rowe, and Konstantinos Mavropanos.

During the preseason, Arsenal competed in the International Champions Cup, finishing 3rd, and the Emirates Cup and Joan Gamper Trophy finals, losing both. Arsenal started the Premier League with a 1–0 win against Newcastle United, and continued a consistent form of results, standing third at the table at the time of the October international break, as well as advancing to the fourth round of the EFL Cup. However, their results began to deteriorate, losing to Liverpool in the fourth round of the EFL Cup and winning only once in 9 games since the end of the international break. As a result, head coach Unai Emery was sacked on 29 November, and former player Freddie Ljungberg took over as caretaker manager. He led Arsenal to the round of 32 in the Europa League, but had only won once in 5 games, and was replaced on 20 December by Manchester City assistant coach and former captain Mikel Arteta. New boss Arteta named his coaching staff on 24 December, with assistants Albert Stuivenberg and Steve Round, and goalkeeping coach Iñaki Caña joining the club. Ljungberg remained as assistant coach, and goalkeeping coach Sal Bibbo stayed to work with Caña.

Results showed an improvement following Arteta's third game in charge against Manchester United, which Arsenal had won 2–0, and Arteta had signed defenders Pablo Mari and Cedric Soares on loans with options to buy in the winter transfer window. Arsenal beat Leeds United and Bournemouth to move to the fifth round of the FA Cup, and remained undefeated in all competitions in 2020 until 27 February, when Greek club Olympiacos knocked them out of the round of 32 of the Europa League on away goals by winning 2–1 at the Emirates. Arsenal remained consistent domestically, advancing to the quarter-finals of the FA Cup after defeating Portsmouth but remaining in roughly the same mid-table position in the Premier League.

The COVID-19 pandemic caused all competitions to be suspended from March until 17 June, when Arsenal played Manchester City in a game originally scheduled to take place on 11 March, and lost 3–0. Further defeats to Brighton, Tottenham Hotspur and Aston Villa condemned Arsenal to an eighth-place finish, far from a European qualification spot and with the worst points return over a 38-game Premier League season. However, victories in the FA Cup against Sheffield United in the quarter-finals and Manchester City in the semi-finals put Arsenal in the final, where they beat Chelsea 2–1 on 1 August to win their only silverware of the season and gain qualification to the Europa League.

== First-team coaching staff ==
=== Unai Emery (1 July 2019 – 29 November 2019) ===
Position	Name
Head coach	(Spain) Unai Emery
Assistant head coaches	(Spain) Juan Carlos Carcedo
Assistant head coaches	(Sweden) Freddie Ljungberg
Coach	(Spain) Pablo Villa
Goalkeeping coaches	(Spain) Javi García
Goalkeeping coaches	(England) Sal Bibbo

=== Freddie Ljungberg (29 November 2019 – 20 December 2020) ===
Position	Name
Interim head coach	(Sweden) Freddie Ljungberg
Interim assistant coach	(Germany) Per Mertesacker
Goalkeeping coach	(England) Sal Bibbo

=== Mikel Arteta (20 December 2019 – 1 August 2020) ===
Position	Name
Head coach	(Spain) Mikel Arteta
Assistant coaches	(Sweden) Freddie Ljungberg
Assistant coaches	(Netherlands) Albert Stuivenberg
Assistant coaches	(England) Steve Round
Goalkeeping coaches	(Spain) Iñaki Caña
Goalkeeping coaches	(England) Sal Bibbo

== Players ==
N	Pos.	Nat.	Name	Age	EU	Since	App	Goals	Ends	Transfer fee	Notes
1	GK	(Germany)	Bernd Leno	28	EU	2018	68	0	2023	£22.5M	
2	DF	(Spain)	Héctor Bellerín	25	EU	2013	204	8	2023	Academy	Vice-captain
3	DF	(Scotland)	Kieran Tierney	23	EU	2019	24	1	2024	£25.0M	
4	MF	(Egypt)	Mohamed Elneny	27	Non-EU	2016 (Winter)	89	2	2022	£7.4M	On loan at Beşiktaş
5	DF	(Greece)	Sokratis Papastathopoulos	32	EU	2018	69	6	2021	£17.6M	
7	MF	(Armenia)	Henrikh Mkhitaryan	31	Non-EU	2018 (Winter)	59	9	2021	Swap deal	On loan at A.S. Roma
8	MF	(Spain)	Dani Ceballos	23	EU	2019	37	2	2020	Loan	On loan from Real Madrid
9	FW	(France)	Alexandre Lacazette	29	EU	2017	127	48	2022	£46.5M	3rd captain
10	MF	(Germany)	Mesut Özil	31	EU	2013	254	44	2021	£42.5M	4th captain
11	MF	(Uruguay)	Lucas Torreira	24	EU	2018	89	4	2023	£26.4M	
14	FW	(Gabon)	Pierre-Emerick Aubameyang	31	EU	2018 (Winter)	109	70	2021	£56.0M	Captain
15	MF	(England)	Ainsley Maitland-Niles	22	EU	2014	100	3	2023	Academy	
16	DF	(England)	Rob Holding	24	EU	2016	76	2	2023	£2.0M	
17	DF	(Portugal)	Cédric Soares	28	EU	2020 (Winter)	5	1	2024		
19	FW	(Ivory Coast)	Nicolas Pépé	25	EU	2019	42	8	2024	£72.0M	
20	DF	(Germany)	Shkodran Mustafi	28	EU	2016	142	9	2021	£35.0M	
21	DF	(England)	Calum Chambers	25	EU	2014	101	4	2022	£16.0M	
22	DF	(Spain)	Pablo Marí	26	EU	2020	3	0	2024	£7.2M	
23	DF	(Brazil)	David Luiz	33	EU	2019	43	2	2021	£8.0M	
24	FW	(England)	Reiss Nelson	20	EU	2017	38	3	2023	Academy	
26	GK	(Argentina)	Emiliano Martínez	27	Non-EU	2012	37	0	2022	Academy	
27	DF	(Greece)	Konstantinos Mavropanos	22	EU	2018 (Winter)	8	0	2023	£1.9M	On loan at Nürnberg
28	MF	(England)	Joe Willock	20	EU	2017	60	8	2024	Academy	
29	MF	(France)	Matteo Guendouzi	21	EU	2018	82	1	2022	£7.0M	
30	FW	(England)	Eddie Nketiah	21	EU	2017	36	7	2022	Academy	
31	DF	(Bosnia and Herzegovina)	Sead Kolašinac	27	EU	2017	104	5	2022	Free	
32	MF	(England)	Emile Smith Rowe	19	EU	2018	12	3	2023	Academy	On loan at Huddersfield Town
33	GK	(England)	Matt Macey	25	EU	2014	2	0	2020	Academy	
34	MF	(Switzerland)	Granit Xhaka	27	EU	2016	175	12	2023	£34.5M	
35	FW	(Brazil)	Gabriel Martinelli	19	EU	2019	26	10	2024	£6.0M	
77	MF	(England)	Bukayo Saka	19	EU	2018	42	4	2025	Academy	
	DF	(France)	William Saliba	19	EU	2019	0	0	2024	£27.0M	On loan at Saint-Étienne

- Last updated: 01 Aug 2020
- Source: Arsenal FC and FootballDatabase (for EU passport, country as international player, contract ending and transfer fee)
- Ordered by squad number.

== Transfers ==
=== Transfers in ===
Date	Position	Name	From	Fee	Team	Ref.
2 July 2019	LW	(Brazil) Gabriel Martinelli	(Brazil) Ituano	£6,000,000	First team	
2 July 2019	GK	(England) James Hillson	(England) Reading	Free transfer	Academy	
8 July 2019	CB	(England) Jason Sraha	(England) Chelsea	Free transfer	Academy	
8 July 2019	AM	(Romania) Cătălin Cîrjan	(Romania) Viitorul Domnești	Free transfer	Academy	
25 July 2019	CB	(France) William Saliba	(France) Saint-Étienne	£27,000,000	First team	
1 August 2019	RW	(Ivory Coast) Nicolas Pépé	(France) Lille	£72,000,000	First team	
8 August 2019	LB	(Scotland) Kieran Tierney	(Scotland) Celtic	£25,000,000	First team	
8 August 2019	CB	(Brazil) David Luiz	(England) Chelsea	£8,000,000	First team	

=== Loans in ===
Date	Position	Name	From	End date	Team	Ref.
25 July 2019	CM	(Spain) Dani Ceballos	(Spain) Real Madrid	30 June 2020	First team	
29 January 2020	CB	(Spain) Pablo Marí	(Brazil) Flamengo	30 June 2020	First team	
31 January 2020	RB	(Portugal) Cédric Soares	(England) Southampton	30 June 2020	First team	

=== Transfers out ===
Date	Position	Name	To	Fee	Team	Ref.
1 July 2019	LB	(England) Cohen Bramall	(England) Colchester United	Released	Academy	
1 July 2019	GK	(Czech Republic) Petr Čech	Retired		First team	
1 July 2019	RB	(England) Vontae Daley-Campbell	(England) Leicester City	Released	Academy	
1 July 2019	DM	(Scotland) Charlie Gilmour	(England) Norwich City	Released	Academy	
1 July 2019	RB	(Switzerland) Stephan Lichtsteiner	(Germany) FC Augsburg	Released	First team	
1 July 2019	CB	(Spain) Julio Pleguezuelo	(Netherlands) FC Twente	Released	Academy	
1 July 2019	CM	(Wales) Aaron Ramsey	(Italy) Juventus	Released	First team	
1 July 2019	CB	(Guyana) Bayli Spencer-Adams	(England) Watford	Released	Academy	
1 July 2019	CF	(England) Danny Welbeck	(England) Watford	Released	First team	
4 July 2019	GK	(Colombia) David Ospina	(Italy) Napoli	£3,000,000	First team	
8 July 2019	CM	(United States) Yunus Musah	(Spain) Valencia	Released	Academy	
28 July 2019	RW	(England) Xavier Amaechi	(Germany) Hamburger SV	£2,250,000	Academy	
2 August 2019	CB	(Poland) Krystian Bielik	(England) Derby County	£10,000,000	Academy	
4 August 2019	SS	(Japan) Takuma Asano	(Serbia) Partizan Belgrade	£900,000	First team	
6 August 2019	CB	(France) Laurent Koscielny	(France) Bordeaux	£4,600,000	First team	
7 August 2019	RB	(England) Carl Jenkinson	(England) Nottingham Forest	£2,000,000	First team	
8 August 2019	LB	(England) Dominic Thompson	(England) Brentford	£3,000,000	Academy	
8 August 2019	LW	(Nigeria) Alex Iwobi	(England) Everton	£28,000,000	First team	
31 August 2019	LB	(Spain) Nacho Monreal	(Spain) Real Sociedad	£250,000	First team	
2 September 2019	AM	(Nigeria) Kelechi Nwakali	(Spain) SD Huesca	Released	Academy	
27 January 2020	AM	(England) Stan Flaherty	(England) Newcastle United	Released	Academy	
18 February 2020	CM	(Wales) Robbie Burton	(Croatia) Dinamo Zagreb	£800,000	Academy	

==== Notes ====
1. Fee could rise to £35,000,000.

=== Loans out ===
Date	Position	Name	To	End date	Team	Ref.
1 July 2019	RB	(England) Jordi Osei-Tutu	(Germany) VfL Bochum	30 June 2020	Academy	
3 July 2019	CB	(Northern Ireland) Daniel Ballard	(England) Swindon Town	16 August 2019	Academy	
12 July 2019	DM	(England) Ben Sheaf	(England) Doncaster Rovers	30 June 2020	Academy	
13 July 2019	GK	(North Macedonia) Dejan Iliev	(Slovakia) ŠKF Sereď	14 January 2020	Academy	
25 July 2019	CB	(France) William Saliba	(France) Saint-Étienne	30 June 2020	First team	
8 August 2019	CF	(England) Eddie Nketiah	(England) Leeds United	1 January 2020	First team	
13 August 2019	GK	(England) Tom Smith	(England) Salisbury	September 2019	Academy	
31 August 2019	DM	(Egypt) Mohamed Elneny	(Turkey) Beşiktaş	30 June 2020	First team	
2 September 2019	AM	(Armenia) Henrikh Mkhitaryan	(Italy) A.S. Roma	30 June 2020	First team	
10 January 2020	CF	(England) Tyreece John-Jules	(England) Lincoln City	30 June 2020	Under-23s	
10 January 2020	LM	(England) Emile Smith Rowe	(England) Huddersfield Town	30 June 2020	First team	
13 January 2020	CB	(Greece) Konstantinos Mavropanos	(Germany) 1. FC Nürnberg	30 June 2020	First team	
14 January 2020	GK	(North Macedonia) Dejan Iliev	(Poland) Jagiellonia Bialystok	30 June 2020	Academy	
27 January 2020	CM	(England) James Olayinka	(England) Northampton Town	30 June 2020	Academy	
13 February 2020	CB	(England) Joseph Olowu	(Republic of Ireland) Cork City	1 November 2020	Academy	

== Club ==
=== Kits ===
Adidas were announced as Arsenal's kit supplier as of the start of the season. This marked the first time since the 1993–94 season that Adidas have been the kit supplier to the club.

Supplier: Adidas / Sponsor: Emirates / Sleeve sponsor: Visit Rwanda

Home	Home alternate	Home; 2020–21	Away	Away alternate	Third	Goalkeeper 1	Goalkeeper 2	Goalkeeper 3	Training Kit 1	Training Kit 2	Training Kit 3

== Squad statistics ==
=== Appearances and goals ===
As of 1 August 2020

No.	Pos.	Nat.	Name	Premier League		FA Cup		EFL Cup		Europa League		Total	
No.	Pos.	Nat.	Name	Apps	Goals	Apps	Goals	Apps	Goals	Apps	Goals	Apps	Goals
1	GK	GER	Bernd Leno	30	0	0	0	0	0	2	0	32	0
2	DF	ESP	Héctor Bellerín	13(2)	1	3	0	1(1)	0	3	0	20(3)	1
3	DF	SCO	Kieran Tierney	12(3)	1	3	0	1(1)	0	4	0	20(4)	1
5	DF	GRE	Sokratis Papastathopoulos	19	2	3(2)	1	0	0	4(1)	0	26(3)	3
8	MF	ESP	Dani Ceballos	18(6)	0	2(3)	1	0(2)	0	3(3)	1	23(14)	2
9	FW	FRA	Alexandre Lacazette	22(8)	10	4	0	0	0	4(1)	2	30(9)	12
10	MF	GER	Mesut Özil	18	1	1	0	2	0	1(1)	0	22(1)	1
11	MF	URU	Lucas Torreira	17(12)	1	1(1)	0	2	1	3(3)	0	23(16)	2
14	FW	GAB	Pierre-Emerick Aubameyang	35(1)	22	2	4	0	0	4(2)	3	41(3)	29
15	MF	ENG	Ainsley Maitland-Niles	15(5)	0	3(2)	0	1	1	4(2)	0	23(9)	1
16	DF	ENG	Rob Holding	6(2)	0	2(3)	0	2	1	3	0	13(5)	1
17	DF	POR	Cédric	3(2)	1	0	0	0	0	0	0	3(2)	1
19	FW	CIV	Nicolas Pépé	22(9)	5	5	1	0	0	2(4)	2	29(13)	8
20	DF	GER	Shkodran Mustafi	13(2)	0	3	0	2	0	7	1	25(2)	1
21	DF	ENG	Calum Chambers	13(1)	1	0	0	1	0	2(1)	0	16(2)	1
22	DF	ESP	Pablo Marí	2	0	1	0	0	0	0	0	3	0
23	DF	BRA	David Luiz	32(1)	2	5	0	0	0	5	0	42(1)	2
24	FW	ENG	Reiss Nelson	7(10)	1	2	1	1	1	2	0	12(10)	3
26	GK	ARG	Emiliano Martínez	8(1)	0	6	0	2	0	6	0	22(1)	0
28	MF	ENG	Joe Willock	8(21)	1	3(2)	0	2	2	7(1)	2	20(24)	5
29	MF	FRA	Matteo Guendouzi	19(5)	0	3	0	0(1)	0	2(4)	0	24(10)	0
30	FW	ENG	Eddie Nketiah	7(6)	2	2(2)	2	0	0	0	0	9(8)	4
31	DF	BIH	Sead Kolašinac	19(7)	0	2(2)	0	1	0	1	0	23(9)	0
33	GK	ENG	Matt Macey	0	0	0	0	0	0	0	0	0	0
34	MF	SUI	Granit Xhaka	30(1)	1	5(1)	0	0	0	4	0	39(2)	1
35	FW	BRA	Gabriel Martinelli	6(8)	3	2(1)	0	2	4	5(2)	3	15(11)	10
77	FW	ENG	Bukayo Saka	19(7)	1	3(1)	1	1(1)	0	6	2	29(9)	4
Players loaned out but featured this season
7	MF	ARM	Henrikh Mkhitaryan	1(2)	0	0	0	0	0	0	0	1(2)	0
27	DF	GRE	Konstantinos Mavropanos	0	0	0	0	0	0	1	0	1	0
32	MF	ENG	Emile Smith Rowe	1(1)	0	0	0	1	0	3	0	5(1)	0
Players sold but featured this season
18	DF	ESP	Nacho Monreal	3	0	0	0	0	0	0	0	3	0

=== Goalscorers ===
As of 1 August 2020

Rank	Position	Name	Premier League	FA Cup	EFL Cup	Europa League	Total
1	FW	(Gabon) Pierre-Emerick Aubameyang	22	4	0	3	29
2	FW	(France) Alexandre Lacazette	10	0	0	2	12
3	FW	(Brazil) Gabriel Martinelli	3	0	4	3	10
4	FW	(Ivory Coast) Nicolas Pépé	5	1	0	2	8
5	MF	(England) Joe Willock	1	0	2	2	5
6	FW	(England) Eddie Nketiah	2	2	0	0	4
6	FW	(England) Bukayo Saka	1	1	0	2	4
8	FW	(England) Reiss Nelson	1	1	1	0	3
8	DF	(Greece) Sokratis Papastathopoulos	2	1	0	0	3
10	MF	(Spain) Dani Ceballos	0	1	0	1	2
10	DF	(Brazil) David Luiz	2	0	0	0	2
10	MF	(Uruguay) Lucas Torreira	1	0	1	0	2
13	DF	(Spain) Héctor Bellerín	1	0	0	0	1
13	DF	(Portugal) Cédric	1	0	0	0	1
13	DF	(England) Calum Chambers	1	0	0	0	1
13	DF	(England) Rob Holding	0	0	1	0	1
13	MF	(England) Ainsley Maitland-Niles	0	0	1	0	1
13	DF	(Germany) Shkodran Mustafi	0	0	0	1	1
13	MF	(Germany) Mesut Özil	1	0	0	0	1
13	MF	(Switzerland) Granit Xhaka	1	0	0	0	1
13	DF	(Scotland) Kieran Tierney	1	0	0	0	1
Total			56	11	10	16	93

=== Assists ===
As of 1 August 2020

Rank	Position	Name	Premier League	FA Cup	EFL Cup	Europa League	Total
1	FW	(England) Bukayo Saka	5	1	1	5	12
2	MF	(Ivory Coast) Nicolas Pépé	6	2	0	2	10
3	DF	(England) Calum Chambers	1	0	3	0	4
3	FW	(France) Alexandre Lacazette	4	0	0	0	4
3	FW	(Brazil) Gabriel Martinelli	0	1	0	3	4
3	FW	(England) Reiss Nelson	0	2	1	1	4
3	DF	(Scotland) Kieran Tierney	1	1	0	2	4
7	MF	(Germany) Mesut Özil	2	0	1	0	3
7	FW	(Gabon) Pierre-Emerick Aubameyang	3	0	0	0	3
9	MF	(Spain) Dani Ceballos	2	0	0	0	2
9	MF	(France) Matteo Guendouzi	1	0	1	0	2
9	DF	(Bosnia and Herzegovina) Sead Kolašinac	2	0	0	0	2
9	MF	(England) Ainsley Maitland-Niles	2	0	0	0	2
9	MF	(Switzerland) Granit Xhaka	2	0	0	0	2
14	DF	(Spain) Héctor Bellerín	0	0	1	0	1
14	DF	(Brazil) David Luiz	1	0	0	0	1
14	DF	(Germany) Shkodran Mustafi	1	0	0	0	1
14	MF	(Uruguay) Lucas Torreira	1	0	0	0	1
14	MF	(England) Joe Willock	1	0	0	0	1
Total			33	4	8	13	58

=== Disciplinary record ===
As of 27 July 2020

Rank	Position	Name	Premier League		FA Cup		EFL Cup		Europa League		Total	
Rank	Position	Name	Booked	Sent off (straight red)	Booked	Sent off (straight red)	Booked	Sent off (straight red)	Booked	Sent off (straight red)	Booked	Sent off (straight red)
1	DF	(Brazil) David Luiz	5	2	0	0	0	0	0	0	5	2
2	DF	(England) Ainsley Maitland-Niles	4	1	0	0	0	0	0	0	4	1
3	FW	(Gabon) Pierre-Emerick Aubameyang	3	1	0	0	0	0	0	0	3	1
4	FW	(England) Eddie Nketiah	0	1	0	0	0	0	0	0	0	1
5	MF	(Switzerland) Granit Xhaka	10	0	1	0	0	0	2	0	13	0
6	FW	(France) Alexandre Lacazette	8	0	0	0	0	0	1	0	9	0
7	MF	(France) Matteo Guendouzi	6	0	1	0	0	0	1	0	8	0
8	DF	(Bosnia and Herzegovina) Sead Kolašinac	4	0	1	0	1	0	1	0	7	0
8	FW	(England) Bukayo Saka	6	0	0	0	1	0	0	0	7	0
8	MF	(Uruguay) Lucas Torreira	7	0	0	0	0	0	0	0	7	0
11	DF	(England) Calum Chambers	5	0	0	0	0	0	1	0	6	0
11	DF	(Germany) Shkodran Mustafi	2	0	0	0	0	0	4	0	6	0
11	DF	(Greece) Sokratis Papastathopoulos	6	0	0	0	0	0	0	0	6	0
14	FW	(Ivory Coast) Nicolas Pépé	4	0	0	0	0	0	0	0	4	0
14	MF	(England) Joe Willock	2	0	0	0	1	0	1	0	4	0
16	DF	(Spain) Héctor Bellerín	2	0	0	0	0	0	1	0	3	0
17	DF	(England) Rob Holding	1	0	0	0	0	0	1	0	2	0
17	GK	(Germany) Bernd Leno	2	0	0	0	0	0	0	0	2	0
17	FW	(Brazil) Gabriel Martinelli	1	0	0	0	0	0	1	0	2	0
17	GK	(Argentina) Emiliano Martínez	2	0	0	0	0	0	0	0	2	0
17	FW	(England) Reiss Nelson	1	0	0	0	1	0	0	0	2	0
17	DF	(Scotland) Kieran Tierney	2	0	0	0	0	0	0	0	2	0
23	MF	(Spain) Dani Ceballos	1	0	0	0	0	0	0	0	1	0
23	MF	(Armenia) Henrikh Mkhitaryan	1	0	0	0	0	0	0	0	1	0
23	MF	(Germany) Mesut Özil	1	0	0	0	0	0	0	0	1	0
Total			86	5	3	0	4	0	14	0	107	5

=== Clean sheets ===
As of 18 July 2020

Rank	Name	Premier League	FA Cup	EFL Cup	Europa League	Total
1	(Argentina) Emiliano Martinez	3	3	1	2	9
2	(Germany) Bernd Leno	7	0	0	1	8
Total		10	3	1	3	17

== Pre-season and friendlies ==
=== Friendlies ===
15 July 2019	Colorado Rapids	0–3	Arsenal	Commerce City, United States
19:00 MDT	Opare (yellow card) 44'	Report	Saka 13'; Olayinka 29'; Martinelli 61'; Kolašinac (yellow card) 88'	Stadium: Dick's Sporting Goods Park; Referee: Chris Penso (United States)

31 July 2019	Angers	1–1 (3–4 p)	Arsenal	Angers, France
19:30 CEST	El Melali 13'	Report	Medley (yellow card) 37'; Nelson 49'; Willock (yellow card) 74'; Maitland-Niles (yellow card) 89'	Stadium: Stade Raymond Kopa; Referee: Jérémie Pignard (France)
	Penalties
	Manceau (penalty scored); Capelle (penalty scored); Thomas (penalty scored); Kanga (penalty missed); Reine-Adélaïde (penalty missed)		(penalty scored) Maitland-Niles; (penalty scored) Willock; (penalty scored) Xhaka; (penalty scored) Aubameyang; (penalty missed) Mkhitaryan

=== International Champions Cup ===
17 July 2019 ICC	Arsenal	2–1	Bayern Munich	Carson, United States
20:00 PDT	Poznański 49' (o.g.); Nketiah 88'	Report	Lewandowski 71'	Stadium: Dignity Health Sports Park; Attendance: 26,704; Referee: Kevin Stott (United States)

20 July 2019 ICC	Arsenal	3–0	Fiorentina	Charlotte, United States
18:00 EDT	Nketiah 15', 65'; Mkhitaryan (yellow card) 64'; Maitland-Niles (yellow card) 82'; Willock 89'; Xhaka (yellow card) 90'	Report	Saponara (yellow card) 43'; Terracciano (yellow card) 56'	Stadium: Bank of America Stadium; Attendance: 34,902; Referee: Marcos de Oliveira (United States)

23 July 2019 ICC	Real Madrid	2–2 (3–2 p)	Arsenal	Landover, United States
19:00 EDT	Nacho (yellow card) 5' (yellow-red card) 9'; Carvajal (yellow card) 26'; Bale 56'; Asensio 59'	Report	Lacazette 10' (pen.); Aubameyang 24'; Papastathopoulos (yellow card) 38' (yellow-red card) 40'	Stadium: FedExField; Attendance: 52,826; Referee: Timothy Ford (United States)
	Penalties
	Bale (penalty missed); Isco (penalty scored); Varane (penalty scored); Vinícius (penalty scored)		(penalty scored) Nelson; (penalty missed) Xhaka; (penalty scored) Saka; (penalty missed) Monreal; (penalty missed) Burton

=== Emirates Cup ===
28 July 2019	Arsenal	1–2	Lyon	Holloway, London
15:15 BST	Aubameyang 35'	Report	Dembélé 66', 75'	Stadium: Emirates Stadium; Referee: Jonathan Moss (England)

=== Joan Gamper Trophy ===
4 August 2019	Barcelona	2–1	Arsenal	Barcelona, Spain
20:00 CEST	Alba (yellow card) 23'; Wagué (yellow card) 67'; Maitland-Niles 69' (o.g.); Lenglet (yellow card) 74'; Suárez 90'	Report	Aubameyang 36'; Papastathopoulos (yellow card) 74'; Guendouzi (yellow card) 90'	Stadium: Camp Nou; Attendance: 98,812; Referee: Juan Martínez Munuera (Spain)

=== Mid-season friendlies ===
6 June 2020	Arsenal	6–0	Charlton Athletic	Holloway, London
	Lacazette; Aubameyang; Nketiah; Willock	Report		Stadium: Emirates Stadium; Attendance: 0

10 June 2020	Arsenal	2–3	Brentford	Holloway, London
	Willock 40'; Lacazette 77'	Report	Fosu 73'; Dervişoğlu 80'; Baptiste 88'	Stadium: Emirates Stadium; Attendance: 0

== Competitions ==
=== Overview ===
Competition	Record							
Competition	P	W	D	L	GF	GA	GD	Win %
Premier League	38	14	14	10	56	48	+8	36.84
FA Cup	6	6	0	0	11	3	+8	100.00
EFL Cup	2	1	1	0	10	5	+5	50.00
Europa League	8	4	2	2	16	9	+7	50.00
Total	54	25	17	12	93	65	+28	46.30

Updated to match played 1 August 2020
Source: Competitions

=== Premier League ===
==== League table ====
Pos	Team	Pld	W	D	L	GF	GA	GD	Pts	Qualification or relegation
6	Tottenham Hotspur	38	16	11	11	61	47	+14	59	Qualification for the Europa League second qualifying round (Note: Since the winners of the 2019–20 EFL Cup, Manchester City, qualified for the Champions League group stage by league position, the spot given to the EFL Cup winners (Europa League second qualifying round) was passed down to the sixth-placed team.)
7	Wolverhampton Wanderers	38	15	14	9	51	40	+11	59	
8	Arsenal	38	14	14	10	56	48	+8	56	Qualification for the Europa League group stage (Note: Arsenal qualified for the Europa League group stage as the 2019–20 FA Cup winners.)
9	Sheffield United	38	14	12	12	39	39	0	54	
10	Burnley	38	15	9	14	43	50	−7	54	

Source: Premier League
Rules for classification: 1) Points; 2) Goal difference; 3) Goals scored; 4) If the champions, relegated teams or qualified teams for UEFA competitions cannot be determined by rules 1 to 3, rules 4.1 to 4.3 are applied – 4.1) Points gained in head to head record between such teams; 4.2) Away goals scored in head to head record between such teams; 4.3) Play-offs

==== Results by Matchday ====
Matchday	1	2	3	4	5	6	7	8	9	10	11	12	13	14	15	16	17	18	19	20	21	22	23	24	25	26	27	28	29	30	31	32	33	34	35	36	37	38
Ground	A	H	A	H	A	H	A	H	A	H	H	A	H	A	H	A	H	A	A	H	H	A	H	A	A	H	H	H	A	A	A	H	A	H	A	H	A	H
Result	W	W	L	D	D	W	D	W	L	D	D	L	D	D	L	W	L	D	D	L	W	D	D	D	D	W	W	W	L	L	W	W	W	D	L	W	L	W
Position	7	2	3	5	7	4	4	3	5	5	5	6	8	8	10	9	10	11	12	12	10	10	10	10	10	10	9	10	9	10	9	8	7	8	9	9	10	8
Points	3	6	6	7	8	11	12	15	15	16	17	17	18	19	19	22	22	23	24	24	27	28	29	30	31	34	37	40	40	40	43	46	49	50	50	53	53	56

Updated to match(es) played on 26 July 2020. Source: Statto.com
A = Away; H = Home; W = Win; D = Draw; L = Loss

==== Matches ====
On 13 June 2019, the Premier League fixtures were announced.

11 August 2019 1	Newcastle United	0–1	Arsenal	Newcastle upon Tyne
14:00 BST	Almirón (yellow card) 18'	Report	Nelson (yellow card) 25'; Mkhitaryan (yellow card) 37'; Aubameyang 58'; Xhaka (yellow card) 81'	Stadium: St. James' Park; Attendance: 47,635; Referee: Martin Atkinson
Note: Live on Sky Sports

17 August 2019 2	Arsenal	2–1	Burnley	Holloway, London
12:30 BST	Lacazette 13'; Aubameyang (yellow card) 38', (goal) 64'; David Luiz (yellow card) 90+1'	Report	Barnes 43', (yellow card) 90+5'	Stadium: Emirates Stadium; Attendance: 60,214; Referee: Mike Dean
Note: Live on BT Sport

24 August 2019 3	Liverpool	3–1	Arsenal	Liverpool
17:30 BST	Matip 41'; Salah 49' (pen.), 58'; Fabinho (yellow card) 90+3'	Report	David Luiz (yellow card) 48'; Torreira 85'	Stadium: Anfield; Attendance: 53,298; Referee: Anthony Taylor
Note: Live on Sky Sports

1 September 2019 4	Arsenal	2–2	Tottenham Hotspur	Holloway, London
16:30 BST	Lacazette 45+1', (yellow card) 63'; Aubameyang 71'; Papastathopoulos (yellow card) 87'; Xhaka (yellow card) 90+2'	Report	Eriksen 10', (yellow card) 57'; Rose (yellow card) 28'; Lamela (yellow card) 32'; Kane 40' (pen.); Winks (yellow card) 74'; Sánchez (yellow card) 78'	Stadium: Emirates Stadium; Attendance: 60,333; Referee: Martin Atkinson
Note: Live on Sky Sports

15 September 2019 5	Watford	2–2	Arsenal	Watford
16:30 BST	Holebas (yellow card) 45+2'; Cleverley 54'; Femenía (yellow card) 56'; Pereyra 81' (pen.); Capoue (yellow card) 90+2'	Report	Aubameyang 21', 32'; Kolašinac (yellow card) 43'; Guendouzi (yellow card) 45+2'; Leno (yellow card) 77'	Stadium: Vicarage Road; Attendance: 21,360; Referee: Anthony Taylor
Note: Live on Sky Sports

22 September 2019 6	Arsenal	3–2	Aston Villa	Holloway, London
16:30 BST	Maitland-Niles (yellow card) 11' (yellow-red card) 41'; Xhaka (yellow card) 35'; Guendouzi (yellow card) 44'; Pépé 59' (pen.), (yellow card) 85'; Chambers 81'; Aubameyang 84', (yellow card) 90+5'; Leno (yellow card) 90+2'	Report	McGinn 20'; Wesley 60'; Engels (yellow card) 83'	Stadium: Emirates Stadium; Attendance: 60,331; Referee: Jonathan Moss

30 September 2019 7	Manchester United	1–1	Arsenal	Manchester
20:00 BST	Rashford (yellow card) 27'; Pereira (yellow card) 32'; Young (yellow card) 41'; McTominay 45'; Lingard (yellow card) 68'	Report	Chambers (yellow card) 10'; Aubameyang 58'; Xhaka (yellow card) 77'	Stadium: Old Trafford; Attendance: 73,201; Referee: Kevin Friend
Note: Live on Sky Sports

6 October 2019 8	Arsenal	1–0	Bournemouth	Holloway, London
14:00 BST	David Luiz 9'; Martinelli (yellow card) 72'	Report	Billing (yellow card) 13'; Stacey (yellow card) 29'	Stadium: Emirates Stadium; Attendance: 60,326; Referee: Martin Atkinson

21 October 2019 9	Sheffield United	1–0	Arsenal	Sheffield
20:00 BST	Fleck (yellow card) 15'; Mousset 30'; O'Connell (yellow card) 39'; McGoldrick (yellow card) 66'; Henderson (yellow card) 75'	Report	Saka (yellow card) 35'; Kolašinac (yellow card) 67'; Papastathopoulos (yellow card) 86'; Chambers (yellow card) 90+4'	Stadium: Bramall Lane; Attendance: 30,775; Referee: Mike Dean
Note: Live on Sky Sports

27 October 2019 10	Arsenal	2–2	Crystal Palace	Holloway, London
16:30 GMT	Papastathopoulos 7'; David Luiz 9'; Chambers (yellow card) 51'; Guendouzi (yellow card) 90+7'	Report	Milivojević 32' (pen.); Ayew 52'	Stadium: Emirates Stadium; Attendance: 60,345; Referee: Martin Atkinson

2 November 2019 11	Arsenal	1–1	Wolverhampton Wanderers	Holloway, London
15:00 GMT	Aubameyang 21'	Report	Saïss (yellow card) 67'; Jiménez 76'; Jota (yellow card) 89'	Stadium: Emirates Stadium; Attendance: 60,383; Referee: Michael Oliver

9 November 2019 12	Leicester City	2–0	Arsenal	Leicester
17:30 GMT	Evans (yellow card) 55'; Vardy 68'; Maddison 75'	Report	Bellerín (yellow card) 88'	Stadium: King Power Stadium; Attendance: 32,209; Referee: Chris Kavanagh
Note: Live on Sky Sports

23 November 2019 13	Arsenal	2–2	Southampton	Holloway, London
15:00 GMT	Lacazette 18', 90+6', (yellow card) 45+2'; Torreira (yellow card) 23'; Papastathopoulos (yellow card) 28'; Pépé (yellow card) 65'; Tierney (yellow card) 69'; Guendouzi (yellow card) 89'	Report	Ings 8', (yellow card) 31'; Ward-Prowse 71'; Bertrand (yellow card) 81'	Stadium: Emirates Stadium; Attendance: 60,295; Referee: Stuart Attwell

1 December 2019 14	Norwich City	2–2	Arsenal	Norwich
14:00 GMT	Pukki 21'; Krul (yellow card) 26'; McLean (yellow card) 44'; Cantwell 45+2'	Report	Aubameyang 29' (pen.), 57'; Chambers (yellow card) 66'	Stadium: Carrow Road; Attendance: 27,067; Referee: Paul Tierney
Note: Live on Sky Sports

5 December 2019 15	Arsenal	1–2	Brighton & Hove Albion	Holloway, London
20:15 GMT	Bellerín (yellow card) 20'; Papastathopoulos (yellow card) 45+1'; Lacazette 50'; David Luiz (yellow card) 68'	Report	Webster 36'; Groß (yellow card) 60'; Maupay 80'	Stadium: Emirates Stadium; Attendance: 60,164; Referee: Graham Scott

9 December 2019 16	West Ham United	1–3	Arsenal	Stratford, London
20:00 GMT	Snodgrass (yellow card) 24'; Ogbonna 38'; Cresswell (yellow card) 49'	Report	Martinelli 60'; Pépé 66'; Aubameyang 69'	Stadium: London Stadium; Attendance: 59,936; Referee: Mike Dean
Note: Live on Sky Sports

15 December 2019 17	Arsenal	0–3	Manchester City	Holloway, London
16:30 GMT	Papastathopoulos (yellow card) 72'	Report	De Bruyne 2', 40'; Sterling 15'; Fernandinho (yellow card) 17'; Rodri (yellow card) 34'; Gündoğan (yellow card) 61'; Mendy (yellow card) 62'	Stadium: Emirates Stadium; Attendance: 60,031; Referee: Paul Tierney
Note: Live on Sky Sports

21 December 2019 18	Everton	0–0	Arsenal	Liverpool
12:30 GMT	Davies (yellow card) 45'; Sigurðsson (yellow card) 75'	Report	Saka (yellow card) 28'; Chambers (yellow card) 87'; Willock (yellow card) 90+2'	Stadium: Goodison Park; Attendance: 39,336; Referee: Kevin Friend
Note: Live on BT Sport

26 December 2019 19	Bournemouth	1–1	Arsenal	Bournemouth
15:00 GMT	Gosling 35'; Lerma (yellow card) 53'; Mepham (yellow card) 84'; L. Cook (yellow card) 85'; C. Wilson (yellow card) 90+4'	Report	Torreira (yellow card) 54'; Maitland-Niles (yellow card) 55'; Aubameyang 63', (yellow card) 64'; Lacazette (yellow card) 90+3'	Stadium: Vitality Stadium; Attendance: 10,234; Referee: Stuart Attwell

29 December 2019 20	Arsenal	1–2	Chelsea	Holloway, London
14:00 GMT	Guendouzi (yellow card) 10'; Aubameyang 13'; David Luiz (yellow card) 47'; Torreira (yellow card) 73'; Lacazette (yellow card) 77'; Maitland-Niles (yellow card) 90+1'	Report	Mount (yellow card) 30'; Kanté (yellow card) 30'; Rüdiger (yellow card) 34'; Jorginho (yellow card) 55', (goal) 83'; Abraham 87'	Stadium: Emirates Stadium; Attendance: 60,309; Referee: Craig Pawson
Note: Live on Sky Sports

1 January 2020 21	Arsenal	2–0	Manchester United	Holloway, London
20:00 GMT	Kolašinac (yellow card) 3'; Pépé 8'; Papastathopoulos 42'; Saka (yellow card) 82'	Report		Stadium: Emirates Stadium; Attendance: 60,328; Referee: Chris Kavanagh
Note: Live on BT Sport

11 January 2020 22	Crystal Palace	1–1	Arsenal	Selhurst
12:30 GMT	Ayew 54'; McCarthy (yellow card) 71'; Tomkins (yellow card) 85'	Report	Aubameyang 12', (red card) 67'; Pépé (yellow card) 44'; Maitland-Niles (yellow card) 51'; Lacazette (yellow card) 90'	Stadium: Selhurst Park; Attendance: 25,468; Referee: Paul Tierney
Note: Live on BT Sport

18 January 2020 23	Arsenal	1–1	Sheffield United	Holloway, London
15:00 GMT	Martinelli 45'; Xhaka (yellow card) 90+1'	Report	Norwood (yellow card) 4'; Baldock (yellow card) 51'; Fleck 83'	Stadium: Emirates Stadium; Attendance: 60,310; Referee: Mike Dean

21 January 2020 24	Chelsea	2–2	Arsenal	Fulham, London
20:15 GMT	Emerson (yellow card) 21'; Jorginho 28' (pen.); Christensen (yellow card) 59'; Azpilicueta 84'	Report	David Luiz (red card) 26'; Martinelli 63'; Guendouzi (yellow card) 76'; Bellerín 87'	Stadium: Stamford Bridge; Attendance: 40,577; Referee: Stuart Attwell
Note: Live on BT Sport

2 February 2020 25	Burnley	0–0	Arsenal	Burnley
14:00 GMT	Tarkowski (yellow card) 82'	Report	Özil (yellow card) 44'; Xhaka (yellow card) 55'; Torreira (yellow card) 57'	Stadium: Turf Moor; Attendance: 21,048; Referee: Chris Kavanagh
Note: Live on Sky Sports

16 February 2020 26	Arsenal	4–0	Newcastle United	Holloway, London
16:30 GMT	Xhaka (yellow card) 9'; Aubameyang 54'; Pépé 57'; Saka (yellow card) 82'; Özil 90'; Lacazette 90+5'	Report		Stadium: Emirates Stadium; Attendance: 60,188; Referee: Lee Mason
Note: Live on Sky Sports

23 February 2020 27	Arsenal	3–2	Everton	Holloway, London
16:30 GMT	Nketiah 27'; Aubameyang 33', 46'	Report	Calvert-Lewin 1'; Schneiderlin (yellow card) 31'; Richarlison (yellow card) 45+2', (goal) 45+4'; Sigurðsson (yellow card) 73'; Gomes (yellow card) 90+4'	Stadium: Emirates Stadium; Attendance: 60,296; Referee: Stuart Attwell
Note: Live on Sky Sports

7 March 2020 28	Arsenal	1–0	West Ham United	Holloway, London
15:00 GMT	Papastathopoulos (yellow card) 63'; Lacazette 78'	Report	Fornals (yellow card) 9'; Antonio (yellow card) 90+3'	Stadium: Emirates Stadium; Attendance: 60,335; Referee: Martin Atkinson

17 June 2020 29	Manchester City	3–0	Arsenal	Manchester
20:15 BST	Sterling 45+2'; De Bruyne 51' (pen.); Rodri (yellow card) 79'; Foden 90+1'	Report	David Luiz (red card) 49'; Tierney (yellow card) 76'	Stadium: City of Manchester Stadium; Attendance: 0 Referee: Anthony Taylor
Note: Match originally scheduled for 1 March, but postponed to 11 March due to Manchester City's involvement in the 2020 EFL Cup Final. Match was again later postponed following fears that Arsenal personnel had come into contact with Olympiacos owner Evangelos Marinakis, who was positive for COVID-19. It was rescheduled to 17 June.

20 June 2020 30	Brighton & Hove Albion	2–1	Arsenal	Falmer
15:00 BST	Burn (yellow card) 30'; Mooy (yellow card) 44'; Dunk 75'; Maupay 90+5'	Report	Lacazette (yellow card) 54'; Pépé 68'	Stadium: Falmer Stadium; Attendance: 0 Referee: Martin Atkinson
Note: Match originally scheduled for 14 March 2020, but postponed after it was revealed Arsenal manager Mikel Arteta tested positive for COVID-19 on 12 March. It was rescheduled to 20 June.

25 June 2020 31	Southampton	0–2	Arsenal	Southampton
18:00 BST	Stephens (red card) 85'	Report	Mustafi (yellow card) 11'; Nketiah 20'; Saka (yellow card) 48'; Willock 87'	Stadium: St Mary's Stadium; Attendance: 0 Referee: Graham Scott
Note: Match originally scheduled for 22 March, but postponed on 19 March due to concerns over the COVID-19 pandemic. It was rescheduled to 25 June.

1 July 2020 32	Arsenal	4–0	Norwich City	Holloway, London
18:00 BST	Aubameyang 33', 67'; Xhaka 37'; Martínez (yellow card) 63'; Cédric 81'	Report	McLean (yellow card) 27'; Rupp (yellow card) 31'; Vrančić (yellow card) 86'; Stiepermann (yellow card) 90+2'	Stadium: Emirates Stadium; Attendance: 0 Referee: Peter Bankes
Note: Match originally scheduled for 4 April 2020, but postponed on 19 March due to concerns over the COVID-19 pandemic. It was rescheduled to 1 July.

4 July 2020 33	Wolverhampton Wanderers	0–2	Arsenal	Wolverhampton
17:30 BST	Saïss (yellow card) 75'; Coady (yellow card) 84'	Report	David Luiz (yellow card) 32'; Saka 43'; Maitland-Niles (yellow card) 79'; Lacazette 86'; Torreira (yellow card) 88'; Xhaka (yellow card) 90+1'	Stadium: Molineux; Attendance: 0 Referee: Michael Oliver
Note: Match originally scheduled for 13 April 2020, but postponed on 19 March due to concerns over the COVID-19 pandemic. It was rescheduled to 4 July.

7 July 2020 34	Arsenal	1–1	Leicester City	Holloway, London
20:15 BST	Aubameyang 21'; Nketiah (red card) 75'; Mustafi (yellow card) 88'	Report	Vardy 84'	Stadium: Emirates Stadium; Attendance: 0 Referee: Chris Kavanagh
Note: Match originally scheduled for 18 April 2020, but postponed on 3 April due to concerns over the COVID-19 pandemic. It was rescheduled to 7 July.

12 July 2020 35	Tottenham Hotspur	2–1	Arsenal	Tottenham
16:30 BST	Lo Celso (yellow card) 16'; Son 19'; Aurier (yellow card) 34'; Davies (yellow card) 45+2'; Winks (yellow card) 76'; Alderweireld 81'; Bergwijn (yellow card) 87'	Report	Lacazette 16', (yellow card) 45'; Pépé (yellow card) 61'; Saka (yellow card) 90'	Stadium: Tottenham Hotspur Stadium; Attendance: 0 Referee: Michael Oliver
Note: Match originally scheduled for 26 April 2020, but postponed on 3 April due to concerns over the COVID-19 pandemic. It was rescheduled to 12 July.

15 July 2020 36	Arsenal	2–1	Liverpool	Holloway, London
20:15 BST	Lacazette 32'; Nelson 44'; Torreira (yellow card) 46'; Xhaka (yellow card) 81'; Ceballos (yellow card) 90+1'	Report	Mané 20'; Alexander-Arnold (yellow card) 48'	Stadium: Emirates Stadium; Attendance: 0 Referee: Paul Tierney
Note: Match originally scheduled for 2 May 2020, but postponed on 3 April due to concerns over the COVID-19 pandemic. It was rescheduled to 15 July.

21 July 2020 37	Aston Villa	1–0	Arsenal	Aston
20:15 BST	Trézéguet 27'; Douglas Luiz (yellow card) 71'; Targett (yellow card) 87'	Report	Torreira (yellow card) 35'; Lacazette (yellow card) 61'; Kolašinac (yellow card) 80'; Willock (yellow card) 90+1'	Stadium: Villa Park; Attendance: 0 Referee: Chris Kavanagh
Note: Match originally scheduled for 9 May 2020, but postponed on 3 April due to concerns over the COVID-19 pandemic. It was rescheduled to 21 July.

26 July 2020 38	Arsenal	3–2	Watford	Holloway, London
16:00 BST	Aubameyang 5' (pen.), 33'; Tierney 24'; Xhaka (yellow card) 45'; Holding (yellow card) 72'; Martínez (yellow card) 74'	Report	Pereyra (yellow card) 35'; Deeney 43' (pen.); Hughes (yellow card) 45+5'; Dawson (yellow card) 51'; Welbeck 66'	Stadium: Emirates Stadium; Attendance: 0 Referee: Mike Dean
Note: Match originally scheduled for 17 May 2020, but postponed on 3 April due to concerns over the COVID-19 pandemic. It was rescheduled to 26 July.

=== FA Cup ===
6 January 2020 Third round	Arsenal	1–0	Leeds United	Holloway, London
19:56 GMT	Nelson 55'; Kolašinac (yellow card) 71'	Report	Klich (yellow card) 66'; Dallas (yellow card) 85'	Stadium: Emirates Stadium; Attendance: 58,403; Referee: Anthony Taylor

27 January 2020 Fourth round	Bournemouth	1–2	Arsenal	Bournemouth
20:00 GMT	H. Wilson (yellow card) 45+1'; Surridge 90+4', (yellow card) 90+8'	Report	Saka 5'; Nketiah 26'; Xhaka (yellow card) 90+2'	Stadium: Dean Court; Attendance: 10,308; Referee: Martin Atkinson

2 March 2020 Fifth round	Portsmouth	0–2	Arsenal	Portsmouth
19:45 GMT	McGeehan (yellow card) 40'	Report	Guendouzi (yellow card) 35'; Papastathopoulos 45+4'; Nketiah 51'	Stadium: Fratton Park; Attendance: 18,839; Referee: Mike Dean

28 June 2020 Quarter-finals	Sheffield United	1–2	Arsenal	Sheffield
13:00 BST	Fleck (yellow card) 31'; Robinson (yellow card) 75'; McGoldrick 87'	Report	Pépé 25' (pen.); Ceballos 90+1'	Stadium: Bramall Lane; Attendance: 0 Referee: Paul Tierney
Note: The match was postponed due to the COVID-19 pandemic, and rescheduled to 28 June.

18 July 2020 Semi-finals	Arsenal	2–0	Manchester City	Wembley
19:45 BST	Aubameyang 19', 71'	Report		Stadium: Wembley Stadium; Attendance: 0 Referee: Jonathan Moss

1 August 2020 Final	Arsenal	2–1	Chelsea	Wembley
17:30 BST	Aubameyang 28' (pen.), 67'; Ceballos (yellow card) 73'	Report	Pulisic 5'; Kovačić (yellow card) 14' (yellow-red card) 73'; Azpilicueta (yellow card) 26'; Mount (yellow card) 45+4'; Rüdiger (yellow card) 75'; Barkley (yellow card) 89'	Stadium: Wembley Stadium; Attendance: 0 Referee: Anthony Taylor

=== EFL Cup ===
24 September 2019 Third round	Arsenal	5–0	Nottingham Forest	Holloway, London
20:00 BST	Martinelli 31', 90+2'; Nelson (yellow card) 56', (goal) 84'; Holding 71'; Willock 77'	Report	Robinson (yellow card) 90+1'	Stadium: Emirates Stadium; Attendance: 53,160; Referee: Darren England

30 October 2019 Fourth round	Liverpool	5–5 (5–4 p)	Arsenal	Liverpool
19:30 GMT	Mustafi 6' (o.g.); Brewster (yellow card) 24'; Milner 43' (pen.); Lallana (yellow card) 44'; Oxlade-Chamberlain 58'; Origi 62', 90+4'	Report	Torreira 19'; Martinelli 26', 36'; Maitland-Niles 54'; Willock (yellow card) 64', (goal) 70'; Kolašinac (yellow card) 77'; Saka (yellow card) 85'	Stadium: Anfield; Attendance: 52,694; Referee: Andre Marriner
	Penalties
	Milner (penalty scored); Lallana (penalty scored); Brewster (penalty scored); Origi (penalty scored); Jones (penalty scored)		(penalty scored) Bellerín; (penalty scored) Guendouzi; (penalty scored) Martinelli; (penalty missed) Ceballos; (penalty scored) Maitland-Niles

=== UEFA Europa League ===
Arsenal entered the competition in the group stages as a result for their fifth-place finish in the 2018–19 season. The Gunners were drawn with Eintracht Frankfurt, Standard Liège and Vitória.

==== Group stage ====
Pos	Team	Pld	W	D	L	GF	GA	GD	Pts	Qualification	ARS	FRA	STL	VSC
1	(England) Arsenal	6	3	2	1	14	7	+7	11	Advance to knockout phase	—	1–2	4–0	3–2
2	(Germany) Eintracht Frankfurt	6	3	0	3	8	10	−2	9	Advance to knockout phase	0–3	—	2–1	2–3
3	(Belgium) Standard Liège	6	2	2	2	8	10	−2	8		2–2	2–1	—	2–0
4	(Portugal) Vitória de Guimarães	6	1	2	3	7	10	−3	5		1–1	0–1	1–1	—

Source: UEFA
Rules for classification: Group stage tiebreakers

19 September 2019 1	Eintracht Frankfurt (Germany)	0–3	(England) Arsenal	Frankfurt, Germany
18:55 CEST	Hinteregger (yellow card) 12'; Kohr (yellow card) 62' (yellow-red card) 79'; Kamada (yellow card) 83'	Report	Willock 38', (yellow card) 63'; Kolašinac (yellow card) 75'; Chambers (yellow card) 83'; Saka 85'; Aubameyang 87'	Stadium: Commerzbank-Arena; Attendance: 47,000; Referee: Davide Massa (Italy)

3 October 2019 2	Arsenal (England)	4–0	(Belgium) Standard Liège	London, England
20:00 BST	Martinelli 13', 16'; Willock 22'; Ceballos 57'; Bellerín (yellow card) 86'	Report	M'Poku (yellow card) 41'; Vojvoda (yellow card) 86'	Stadium: Emirates Stadium; Attendance: 58,725; Referee: Sandro Schärer (Switzerland)

24 October 2019 3	Arsenal (England)	3–2	(Portugal) Vitória de Guimarães	London, England
20:00 BST	Martinelli 32'; Mustafi (yellow card) 35'; Lacazette (yellow card) 75'; Pépé 80', 90+2'	Report	Edwards 9'; Bruno 37'; García (yellow card) 58'; Poha (yellow card) 61'; Tapsoba (yellow card) 84'	Stadium: Emirates Stadium; Attendance: 60,195; Referee: Serdar Gözübüyük (Netherlands)

6 November 2019 4	Vitória de Guimarães (Portugal)	1–1	(England) Arsenal	Guimarães, Portugal
16:50 CET	Rafa (yellow card) 33'; Bruno 90+1'	Report	Mustafi (yellow card) 18', (goal) 80'; Holding (yellow card) 66'	Stadium: Estádio D. Afonso Henriques; Attendance: 17,822; Referee: Halis Özkahya (Turkey)
Note: The Vitória de Guimarães v Arsenal match was rescheduled to 6 November 2019 in order to avoid a scheduling conflict with the Braga v Beşiktaş match.

28 November 2019 5	Arsenal (England)	1–2	(Germany) Eintracht Frankfurt	London, England
20:00 GMT	Martinelli (yellow card) 34'; Aubameyang 45+2'; Mustafi (yellow card) 74'; Xhaka (yellow card) 86'; Guendouzi (yellow card) 90+2'	Report	Kostić (yellow card) 20'; Kamada 55', 63'; Abraham (yellow card) 59'; Paciência (yellow card) 90+2'	Stadium: Emirates Stadium; Attendance: 49,419; Referee: Ruddy Buquet (France)

12 December 2019 6	Standard Liège (Belgium)	2–2	(England) Arsenal	Liège, Belgium
18:55 CET	Bastien 47'; Amallah 69'	Report	Lacazette 79'; Saka 81'	Stadium: Stade Maurice Dufrasne; Attendance: 21,797; Referee: Andreas Ekberg (Sweden)

==== Knockout phase ====
The draw for the Round of 32 was confirmed on 16 December.

===== Round of 32 =====
20 February 2020 First leg	Olympiacos (Greece)	0–1	(England) Arsenal	Piraeus, Greece
22:00 EET	El-Arabi (yellow card) 19'; Semedo (yellow card) 26'; Bouchalakis (yellow card) 50'; Ba (yellow card) 90+1'	Report	Mustafi (yellow card) 71'; Lacazette 81'; Xhaka (yellow card) 83'	Stadium: Karaiskakis Stadium; Attendance: 31,456; Referee: Felix Zwayer (Germany)

27 February 2020 Second leg	Arsenal (England)	1–2 (a.e.t.) (2–2 (a) agg.)	(Greece) Olympiacos	London, England
20:00 GMT	Aubameyang 113'	Report	Ba (yellow card) 21'; Cissé 53'; Camara (yellow card) 59'; El-Arabi 120'	Stadium: Emirates Stadium; Attendance: 60,242; Referee: Davide Massa (Italy)

== Awards ==
=== Arsenal Player of the Month award ===
Arsenal Player of the Month award winners were chosen via open-access polls on the club's official website.

Month	Player	Votes
August	Pierre-Emerick Aubameyang (GAB)	34%
September	Matteo Guendouzi (FRA)	48%
October	Gabriel Martinelli (BRA)	75%
November	Bernd Leno (GER)	83%
December	Lucas Torreira (URU)	37%
January	Gabriel Martinelli (BRA)	49%
February	Bukayo Saka (ENG)	
June	Kieran Tierney (SCO)	40%

=== Arsenal Goal of the Month award ===
Arsenal Goal of the Month award winners were chosen via open-access polls on the club's official website.

Month	Player	Competition	Opponent	Votes
August	Pierre-Emerick Aubameyang (GAB)	Premier League	Burnley	34%
September	Alexandre Lacazette (FRA)	Premier League	Tottenham	39%
October	Joe Willock (ENG)	EFL Cup	Liverpool	46%
November	Kim Little (SCO)	Women's Super League	Tottenham Hotspur	31%
December	Nicolas Pépé (CIV)	Premier League	West Ham United	29%
January	Gabriel Martinelli (BRA)	Premier League	Chelsea	60%
February	Pierre-Emerick Aubameyang (GAB)	Europa League	Olympiacos	22%
June	Dani Ceballos (ESP)	FA Cup	Sheffield United	26%

=== Arsenal Player of the Season award ===
Arsenal Player of the Season award winner was chosen via open-access polls on the club's official website.

Rank	Player	Votes
1st	Pierre-Emerick Aubameyang (GAB)	74%
2nd	Bernd Leno (GER)	16%
3rd	Bukayo Saka (ENG)	10%

=== Arsenal Goal of the Season award ===
Arsenal Goal of the Season award winners were chosen via open-access polls on the club's official website.

Rank	Player	Competition	Opponent
1st	Gabriel Martinelli (BRA)	Premier League	Chelsea
2nd	Pierre-Emerick Aubameyang (GAB)	FA Cup	Chelsea
3rd	Joe Willock (ENG)	EFL Cup	Liverpool
