= Akermann Silva =

Venezuelan-Chilean footballer (born 1995)

Personal information
- Full name: Francesco Andrés Akermann Silva
- Date of birth: 7 March 1995 (age 31)
- Place of birth: Venezuela
- Height: 1.80 m (5 ft 11 in)
- Position: Forward

Youth career
- Danger Cerro Barón
- Santiago Wanderers
- Unión La Calera

Senior career*
Years	Team	Apps	(Gls)
2013–2016	Unión La Calera	5	(0)
2015–2016	→ Brujas de Salamanca (loan)	–	(–)
2017	Provincial Ovalle	–	(–)
2017–2018	Casey Comets	–	(–)
2019	Provincial Ovalle	–	(–)
- * Club domestic league appearances and goals as of 10 September 2022

Francesco Andrés Akermann Silva (born 7 March 1995) is a Venezuelan-born Chilean professional footballer who last played for Provincial Ovalle as a forward.

== Career ==
As a child, he was with club Danger from Cerro Barón and Santiago Wanderers. Next he played for Unión La Calera, making five appearances, and was loaned to Brujas de Salamanca in the Tercera B in 2015. After he played for Provincial Ovalle and Casey Comets FC in Australia.

== Personal life ==
He prefers to be named Akermann Francesco Silva.

He came to Valparaíso, Chile, at the age of 7 and naturalized Chilean by residence.
