= Giuseppe Ponsat =

Italian footballer

Personal information
- Date of birth: 21 September 1995 (age 31)
- Place of birth: Turin, Italy
- Height: 1.74 m (5 ft 9 in)
- Position: Forward

Team information
- Current team: Chisola

Youth career
- 2011–2012: Juventus
- 2012–2013: Pro Vercelli

Senior career*
Years	Team	Apps	(Gls)
2013–2015	Novese	58	(13)
2015–2016	Correggese	26	(17)
2016–2017	Forli	30	(6)
2017–2018	Monza	29	(2)
2018–2019	Reggiana	30	(7)
2019–2020	Arzachena	21	(6)
2020	Campodarsego	5	(0)
2020–2021	Torres	20	(1)
2021–2023	Chieri	62	(24)
2023–	Chisola	19	(9)
- * Club domestic league appearances and goals as of 20 December 2023

Giuseppe Ponsat (born 21 September 1995) is an Italian professional football player who plays for Serie D club Chisola.
