= Marco Palermo =

Italian footballer

Personal information
- Date of birth: 1 November 1995 (age 31)
- Place of birth: Catania, Italy
- Height: 1.80 m (5 ft 11 in)
- Position: Midfielder

Team information
- Current team: Nissa
- Number: 23

Senior career*
Years	Team	Apps	(Gls)
2013–2014	Catania San Pio X	2	(0)
2014–2019	Siracusa	130	(3)
2019–2020	Sicula Leonzio	25	(1)
2020–2022	Pergolettese	25	(0)
2022	Latina	9	(0)
2022–2023	Catania	31	(8)
2023	Lamezia Terme	4	(2)
2023–2024	Trapani	16	(3)
2024–2025	Siracusa	27	(3)
2025–	Nissa	34	(6)
- * Club domestic league appearances and goals as of 30 September 2026

Marco Palermo (born 1 November 1995) is an Italian footballer who plays as a midfielder for Serie D club Nissa.

== Club career ==
Born in Catania, Palermo started his career on amateur level. He joined Siracusa for 2014–15 season, and won three consecutive promotion with the club, from Eccellenza to Serie C. He made his professional debut on 5 March 2017 against Vibonese.

On 8 September 2020, he joined Serie C club Pergolettese. On 31 January 2022, his contract with Pergolettese was terminated by mutual consent.

On 3 February 2022, he signed for Latina.
