= Marina Lukić =

Bosnia and Herzegovina footballer

Personal information
- Date of birth: 5 October 1995 (age 31)
- Position: Midfielder

International career^{‡}
Years	Team	Apps	(Gls)
- Bosnia and Herzegovina
- ‡ National team caps and goals as of 19:27, 30 August 2019 (UTC)

Marina Lukić (born 5 October 1995) is a Bosnian footballer who plays as a midfielder and has appeared for the Bosnia and Herzegovina women's national team.

== Career ==
Lukić has been capped for the Bosnia and Herzegovina national team, appearing for the team during the 2019 FIFA Women's World Cup qualifying cycle.
