= Konstantinos Beglektsis =

Greek footballer (born 1995)

Personal information
- Full name: Konstantinos Beglektsis
- Date of birth: 5 January 1995 (age 31)
- Place of birth: Athens, Greece
- Height: 1.78 m (5 ft 10 in)
- Position: Striker

Youth career
- Panionios

Senior career*
Years	Team	Apps	(Gls)
2013–2014	Panionios	2	(0)
2014–2015	Mandraikos		
2015	Sparti		
2016	Kalamata		
2016–2017	Paniliakos	24	(18)
2017–2018	Ialysos		
2018–2019	AER Afantou	26	(6)
2019–2021	Erani Filiatra		
2021–2022	Palliniakos	21	(5)

International career^{‡}
2013	Greece U18	3	(0)
- * Club domestic league appearances and goals as of 10 February 2014 ‡ National team caps and goals as of 27 October 2013

Konstantinos Beglektsis (Greek: Κωνσταντίνος Μπεγλεκτσής; born 5 January 1995) is a Greek footballer who plays as a striker.

== Club career ==
He made his professional debut for Panionios on 10 February 2013 against PAS Giannina F.C. on a 0–1 defeat under coach Dimitrios Eleftheropoulos.

== International career ==
He made his international debut for Greece U18 on 5 January 2013 against Slovenia U18.

== Personal life ==
He is nephew of former Greek international footballer Nikos Liberopoulos.
