= Bully Drammeh =

Gambian international footballer

Personal information
- Date of birth: 15 July 1995 (age 31)
- Place of birth: Brikama, Gambia
- Height: 1.81 m (5 ft 11 in)
- Position: Midfielder

Team information
- Current team: Fortune FC

Senior career*
Years	Team	Apps	(Gls)
2012–2015	Brikama United		
2015–2017	Real de Banjul		
2018	LISCR		
2018–	Fortune FC		

International career^{‡}
2011–2016	Gambia	6	(0)
- * Club domestic league appearances and goals as of 07:25, 6 June 2021 (UTC) ‡ National team caps and goals as of 07:25, 6 June 2021 (UTC)

Bully Drammeh (born 15 July 1995) is a Gambian international footballer who plays for Fortune FC as a midfielder.

== Career ==
Born in Brikama, he has played club football for Brikama United, Real de Banjul, LISCR and Fortune FC.

He made his international debut for Gambia in 2011.
