= Emmanuel Saban Laryea =

Ghanaian footballer (born 1995)

Personal information
- Date of birth: 12 December 1995 (age 30)
- Place of birth: Accra, Ghana
- Height: 1.81 m (5 ft 11 in)
- Position: Defensive midfielder

Team information
- Current team: Sidama Coffee

Youth career
- 2008-2009: Dragon FC
- 2010-2012: Aurorus (Hearts of Oak Junior)

Senior career*
Years	Team	Apps	(Gls)
2012–2017	Hearts of Oak	56	(3)
2017–2018	Dire Dawa City	43	(1)
2019–?	Ococias Kyoto AC		
2021–2022	Defence Force S.C.	29	(0)
2022–2023	Arba Minch City	29	(0)
2024–	Sidama Coffee	9	(1)

International career
2015	Ghana	2	(0)
- * Club domestic league appearances and goals as of 21:08, 13 August 2024 (UTC)

Emmanuel Saban Laryea (born 12 December 1995) is a Ghanaian professional footballer who plays as a defensive midfielder for Ethiopian Premier League club Sidama Coffee.

== Club career ==
Laryea began his career at Dragon FC in 2008. He joined Aurorus (Hearts of Oak Junior) in 2010, where he later joined the senior team Hearts of Oak in 2012.

In late 2017, Laryea signed for Ethiopian Premier League club Dire Dawa City.

Laryea joined Japanese club Ococias Kyoto AC in February 2019.

== International career ==
Saban made two appearances for the Ghana national team in 2015 African Nations Championship qualification.
