= Héctor Bellerín =

Spanish footballer (born 1995)

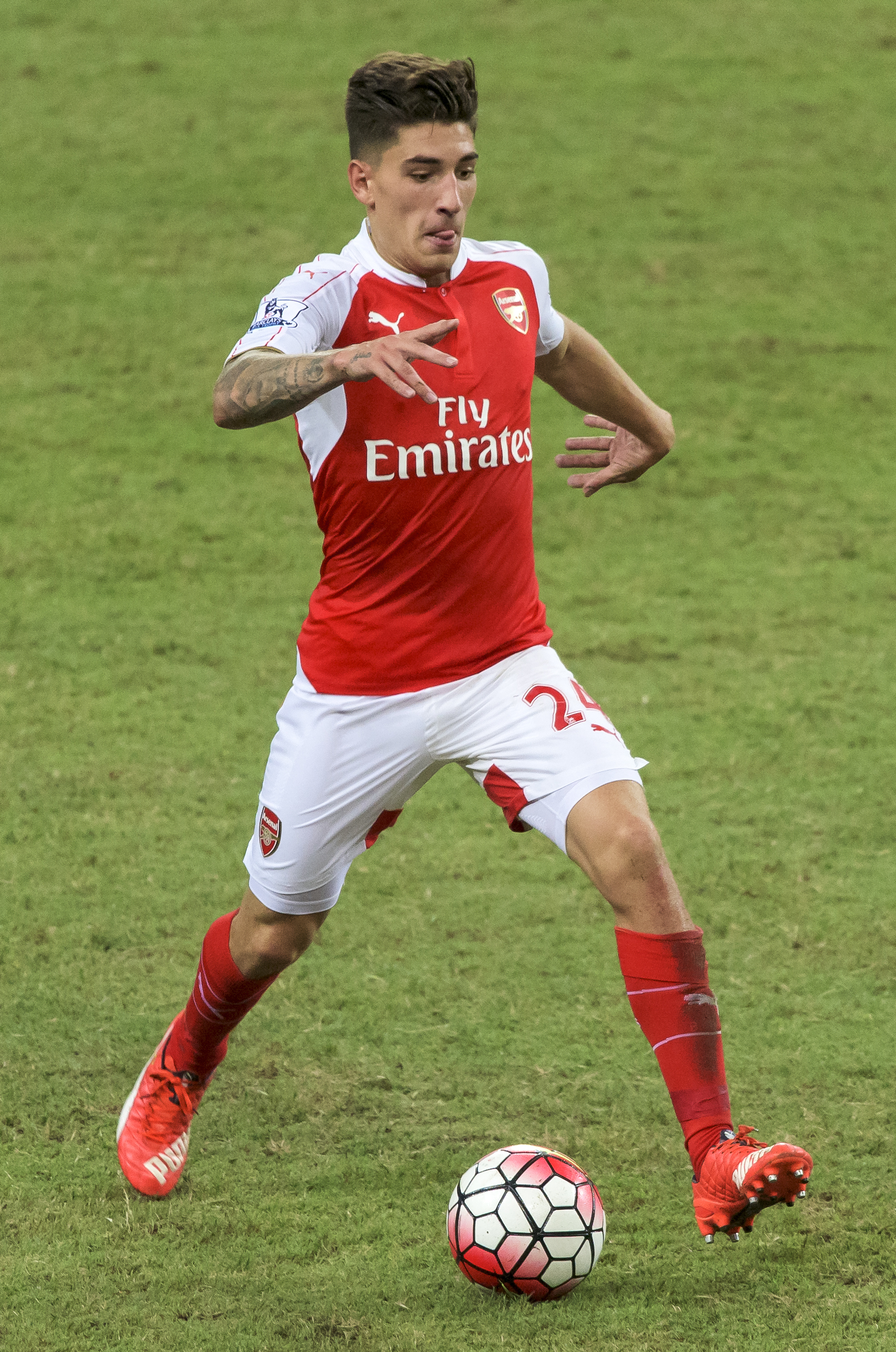
- Bellerín playing for Arsenal in 2015

Personal information
- Full name: Héctor Bellerín Moruno
- Date of birth: 19 March 1995 (age 31)
- Place of birth: Badalona, Spain
- Height: 1.78 m (5 ft 10 in)
- Positions: Right-back; wing-back

Team information
- Current team: Betis
- Number: 2

Youth career
- 2003–2011: Barcelona
- 2011–2013: Arsenal

Senior career*
| Years | Team | Apps | (Gls) |
| 2013–2022 | Arsenal | 183 | (8) |
| 2013–2014 | → Watford (loan) | 8 | (0) |
| 2021–2022 | → Betis (loan) | 23 | (0) |
| 2022–2023 | Barcelona | 3 | (0) |
| 2023 | Sporting CP | 10 | (1) |
| 2023– | Betis | 71 | (2) |

International career
| 2011 | Spain U16 | 6 | (1) |
| 2012 | Spain U17 | 6 | (0) |
| 2013–2014 | Spain U19 | 9 | (0) |
| 2015–2017 | Spain U21 | 14 | (0) |
| 2016–2020 | Spain | 4 | (0) |
| 2024– | Catalonia | 1 | (0) |
Medal record
Representing Spain
Men's football
UEFA European Under-21 Championship
| Runner-up | 2017 |
- * Club domestic league appearances and goals as of 19:13, 21 November 2026 (UTC)

Héctor Bellerín Moruno (born 19 March 1995) is a Spanish professional footballer who plays as a right-back or wing-back for La Liga club Real Betis.

Bellerín started his career at Barcelona, and moved to Arsenal in 2011. He played 239 games across all competitions, winning three FA Cups and two FA Community Shields, as well as a Copa del Rey while on loan at Real Betis. He returned to Barcelona in September 2022, and had a brief spell at Sporting CP in the Primeira Liga before a permanent move to Betis.

Bellerín played internationally for Spain from under-16 to under-21 levels. He made his senior debut for Spain in 2016 and was later chosen for the European Championship of that year.

== Early life ==
Born in Badalona, Barcelona, Catalonia, Bellerín started his club football career in Barcelona's youth team. He moved to Arsenal in the summer of 2011, and signed his first professional contract the following year. While a youth player at Arsenal, Bellerín also helped the club to reach fourth place of the NextGen Series of 2012–13.

== Club career ==
=== Arsenal ===
==== Early career and loan to Watford ====
Bellerín was first included in an Arsenal squad on 26 September 2012, remaining unused in their League Cup third round 6–1 win at home to Coventry City. He made his competitive debut away to West Bromwich Albion in the same competition the following 25 September, coming on in the 95th minute as a substitute in a penalty shoot-out victory after a 1–1 draw.

Two months later, Bellerín joined Championship club Watford on a two-month loan deal, and made his debut against Yeovil Town eight days after signing. The loan at Watford was extended until the end of the season, but he was recalled by Arsenal in February 2014.

==== 2014–15 season: First FA Cup win ====
Following injuries to Mathieu Debuchy, Calum Chambers and Nacho Monreal, Bellerín made his UEFA Champions League debut on 16 September 2014 in a 2–0 defeat away to Borussia Dortmund. He scored his first goal for Arsenal on 1 February 2015, in a 5–0 win against Aston Villa, and added a second on 4 April to open a 4–1 win over Liverpool despite also conceding a penalty kick through a foul on Raheem Sterling.

Bellerín was selected to start for Arsenal in the 2015 FA Cup final on 30 May, helping the team keep a clean sheet in a 4–0 win over Aston Villa at Wembley Stadium.

==== 2015–2018: PFA Team of the Year, second FA Cup win ====
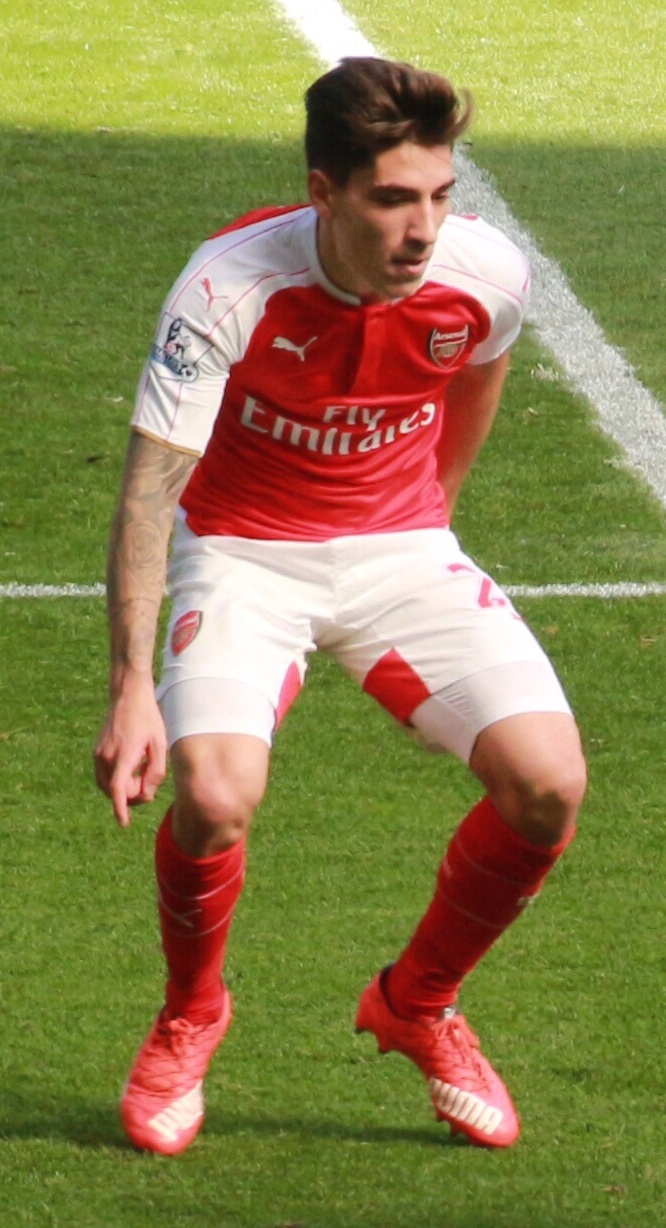
Bellerín playing for Arsenal in 2015

Bellerín signed a new long-term contract before the 2015–16 season and played the entirety of Arsenal's 1–0 win over rivals Chelsea in the 2015 FA Community Shield. He was the sole Arsenal player listed in that season's PFA Team of the Year, and came in third place in Arsenal's Player of the Season voting. On 21 November 2016, he signed a new long-term contract after agreeing to a deal that tied him to the club until 2022.

Bellerín featured in the following season throughout Arsenal's victorious 2016–17 FA Cup campaign. He played in the Cup final which Arsenal went on to win by a 2–1 margin against Chelsea. He was again triumphant in the Gunners lifting the 2017 Community Shield by beating Chelsea 4–1 on penalties.

Bellerín scored his first goal of the 2017–18 season in Arsenal's 3–1 victory over 1. FC Köln. On 3 January 2018, Bellerín earned a draw for Arsenal against Chelsea with what BBC Sport described as a 'stunning injury-time strike' in the 92nd minute, having earlier conceded a penalty for a foul on Eden Hazard. Bellerín played the entire match as Arsenal lost 3–0 to Manchester City in the EFL Cup final at Wembley. On 7 March 2018, Bellerín was ruled out of the UEFA Europa League first-leg clash against Milan with an unknown return date.

==== 2018–2021: Injury, third FA Cup win ====
Bellerín missed out the first five weeks of the 2018–19 season due to a calf problem. During a league game against Chelsea on 19 January he suffered a ruptured anterior cruciate ligament (ACL) in his left knee and was stretchered off of the pitch in the 70th minute at the Emirates Stadium. He was later ruled out for nine months, consequently missing the remainder of the season and the start of the 2019–20 season. Arsenal coach Unai Emery perceives Bellerín as "very mature" and believes that "he is already preparing to come back stronger than before".

On 24 September 2019, Bellerín made his return from injury as a substitute in Arsenal's 5–0 victory against Nottingham Forest in the EFL Cup. On 21 January 2020, he scored in the 87th minute to help Arsenal earn a 2–2 draw against Chelsea in the Premier League. That was his only goal of the season. On 1 August 2020, Bellerín was selected to start in the FA Cup final against Chelsea, and went on to win his third winners' medal as Arsenal won their 14th FA Cup.

On 14 February 2021, Bellerín scored his first goal of the 2020–21 season in a 4–2 win over Leeds United in the Premier League.

==== 2021–22 season: Loan to Real Betis ====
On 31 August 2021, Bellerín returned to Spain after a decade, joining Real Betis on a season-long loan. He made his debut in La Liga around two-weeks later, in a 2–1 win at Granada. On 21 November, he was sent off at Elche for a foul on Tete Morente while his team were winning 3–0, the final score. In the 2022 Copa del Rey final on 23 April, he played the full 120 minutes as his team defeated Valencia to lift the cup.

=== Barcelona ===
On 1 September 2022, Bellerín returned to Barcelona following the termination of his contract at Arsenal. He signed a one-year deal, with Arsenal retaining 25% of a future transfer fee. He was signed to cover the absence of injured right-back Sergiño Dest; Barcelona had previously wanted César Azpilicueta to cover this role, but he renewed at Chelsea instead.

Bellerín made his debut for his hometown club on 10 September, starting in a 4–0 win at Cádiz. Having made only two further substitute appearances, he totalled 141 minutes in the league by the turn of the year. In January 2023, Bellerín told the Catalan newspaper Ara that his annual salary was €500,000, far below the reported salaries of some teammates; he called for footballers to earn less and pay more tax.

=== Sporting CP ===
On 31 January 2023, Bellerín signed a six-month contract with Primeira Liga club Sporting CP, for a fee of €500,000, which could rise to €1.5 million with add-ons. He made his debut for the Portuguese club six days later in a 1–0 win at Rio Ave as a late substitute. He played 13 total games for the team from Lisbon, scoring once on 27 February to open a 2–0 home win over G.D. Estoril-Praia; it was two years to the month since his last goal, for Arsenal against Leeds.

=== Return to Betis ===
On 18 July 2023, Bellerín returned to Betis, signing a five-year deal, on a free transfer. On 24 April 2026, Bellerín scored a last-minute equalizer in stoppage time at La Cartuja to earn Betis a 1–1 draw against Real Madrid.

== International career ==
Having reached the semi-finals of the 2013 UEFA European Championship with the under-19 team, Bellerín made his debut for Albert Celades's under-21 team on 30 March 2015, playing the full 90 minutes of a 4–0 friendly win over Belarus in León.

On 29 May 2016, after being named as a stand-by player for the year's European Championship, Bellerín made his debut for the full squad by starting in a 3–1 friendly win against Bosnia and Herzegovina at the AFG Arena in St. Gallen, Switzerland. Two days later, he was chosen for the final squad after Dani Carvajal withdrew through injury. He was unused as they reached the last 16.

In November 2020, Bellerín was recalled to the Spain squad for the first time in over four years, as Jesús Navas withdrew through injury. He played in a 1–1 friendly draw away to the Netherlands in his comeback match.

== Style of play ==
Early in his career Bellerín was known for his pace, which allowed him to take on opposition defenders as well as provide defensive cover. At the beginning of the 2014–15 season, he broke Theo Walcott's 40-metre (130 ft; 44 yd) Arsenal sprint record by 1/100 of a second.

== Personal life ==
Bellerín is known for his unconventional character revolving around his progressive stances, London accent, fashionable looks and dandy lifestyle. Bellerín became a vegan in 2017, which he credits for improving his health. In an interview in August 2019, he said that footballers have a responsibility to create awareness around environmental issues and that "It's nice to show what we have—our cars, our watches—but good to send a more meaningful message than 'look how cool we are'."

Bellerín dated television personality Jasmine Müller from 2018 to 2021.

The 2019–20 Premier League was suspended in March 2020 because of the COVID-19 pandemic. When it returned in June, Bellerín pledged to plant 3,000 trees for every Arsenal victory in the remainder of the season.

Bellerín became the second-largest shareholder of National League club Forest Green Rovers in September 2020. He praised their commitments to veganism and environmentalism.

Bellerín is also a creative director for the EA Sports FIFA Volta game mode.

=== Politics ===
Known for his opinions on political matters, Bellerín has declared himself left-wing and not a supporter of any political party.

On the day of the 2019 United Kingdom general election, Bellerín criticised Prime Minister and eventual winner Boris Johnson in a tweet where he encouraged young people to vote.

Bellerín is pro-choice. After a May 2019 bill in Alabama passed that imposed a near-total ban on abortion in the state, he posted on Twitter, saying, "I wanted to see if anyone from our industry would speak out about the abortion bill, but I guess people are too scared. This isn’t just an issue for women, it’s one for every human being. We fight for equality and this is something men should fight for and not hide away from."

In March 2022, Bellerín spoke against what he described as double standards of the West on other issues compared to its response to the Russian invasion of Ukraine. "It is quite difficult to see that we are more interested in this war than in others", he told La Media Inglesa. "I don't know if it is because they are more like us or because the conflict can affect us more directly both economically and in terms of refugees. The Palestinian war has been completely silenced, no one speaks about it. Yemen, Iraq... now Russia not being able to play in the World Cup is something that other countries have faced for many years." He went on to say it was racist to "[turn] a blind eye to other conflicts" and that it also showed "a lack of empathy for the number of lives lost in many conflicts and we are prioritising those that are near to us."

In January 2023, Bellerín declared his opposition to Catalan independence, calling himself "Catalan and Spanish" as his parents were born outside the region.

In November 2025, Bellerín declared his support for the mayor-elect of New York City Zohran Mamdani via a video message during Mamdani's appearance on The Adam Friedland Show. Mamdani is a member of Democratic Socialists of America and his policies are progressive and left-wing.

== Career statistics ==
=== Club ===
As of match played 21 November 2026

Appearances and goals by club, season and competition
| Club | Season | League | | | National cup (Note: Includes FA Cup, Copa del Rey) | | League cup (Note: Includes EFL Cup) | | Europe | | Other | | Total | |
| Club | Season | Division | Apps | Goals | Apps | Goals | Apps | Goals | Apps | Goals | Apps | Goals | Apps | Goals |
|---|---|---|---|---|---|---|---|---|---|---|---|---|---|---|
| Arsenal | 2012–13 | Premier League | 0 | 0 | 0 | 0 | 0 | 0 | 0 | 0 | — | | 0 | 0 |
| Arsenal | 2013–14 | Premier League | 0 | 0 | 0 | 0 | 1 | 0 | 0 | 0 | — | | 1 | 0 |
| Arsenal | 2014–15 | Premier League | 20 | 2 | 3 | 0 | 1 | 0 | 4 (Note: Appearances in UEFA Champions League) | 0 | 0 | 0 | 28 | 2 |
| Arsenal | 2015–16 | Premier League | 36 | 1 | 2 | 0 | 0 | 0 | 6 | 0 | 1 (Note: Appearance in FA Community Shield) | 0 | 44 | 1 |
| Arsenal | 2016–17 | Premier League | 33 | 1 | 4 | 0 | 0 | 0 | 5 | 0 | — | | 42 | 1 |
| Arsenal | 2017–18 | Premier League | 35 | 2 | 0 | 0 | 3 | 0 | 8 (Note: Appearances in UEFA Europa League) | 1 | 1 | 0 | 47 | 3 |
| Arsenal | 2018–19 | Premier League | 19 | 0 | 0 | 0 | 0 | 0 | 0 | 0 | — | | 19 | 0 |
| Arsenal | 2019–20 | Premier League | 15 | 1 | 3 | 0 | 2 | 0 | 3 | 0 | — | | 23 | 1 |
| Arsenal | 2020–21 | Premier League | 25 | 1 | 1 | 0 | 1 | 0 | 7 | 0 | 1 | 0 | 35 | 1 |
| Arsenal | Total | | 183 | 8 | 12 | 0 | 8 | 0 | 33 | 1 | 3 | 0 | 239 | 9 |
| Watford (loan) | 2013–14 | Championship | 8 | 0 | — | | — | | — | | — | | 8 | 0 |
| Real Betis (loan) | 2021–22 | La Liga | 23 | 0 | 5 | 0 | — | | 4 | 0 | — | | 32 | 0 |
| Barcelona | 2022–23 | La Liga | 3 | 0 | 2 | 0 | — | | 2 | 0 | 0 | 0 | 7 | 0 |
| Sporting CP | 2022–23 | Primeira Liga | 10 | 1 | — | | — | | 3 | 0 | — | | 13 | 1 |
| Real Betis | 2023–24 | La Liga | 23 | 0 | 2 | 0 | — | | 5 (Note: Three appearances in UEFA Europa League, two appearances in UEFA Europa Conference League) | 0 | — | | 30 | 0 |
| Real Betis | 2024–25 | La Liga | 9 | 0 | 0 | 0 | — | | 4 (Note: Appearances in UEFA Conference League) | 0 | — | | 13 | 0 |
| Real Betis | 2025–26 | La Liga | 27 | 2 | 0 | 0 | — | | 2 | 0 | — | | 29 | 2 |
| Real Betis | 2026–27 | La Liga | 12 | 0 | 1 | 0 | — | | 2 | 0 | — | | 15 | 0 |
| Real Betis | Total | | 71 | 2 | 3 | 0 | — | | 13 | 0 | — | | 87 | 2 |
| Career total | | | 298 | 11 | 22 | 0 | 8 | 0 | 55 | 1 | 3 | 0 | 386 | 12 |

=== International ===
As of match played 12 November 2020

Appearances and goals by national team and year
| National team | Year | Apps | Goals |
|---|---|---|---|
| Spain | 2016 | 3 | 0 |
| Spain | 2017 | 0 | 0 |
| Spain | 2018 | 0 | 0 |
| Spain | 2019 | 0 | 0 |
| Spain | 2020 | 1 | 0 |
| Total | | 4 | 0 |

== Honours ==
Arsenal

- FA Cup: 2014–15, 2016–17, 2019–20
- FA Community Shield: 2015, 2017, 2020
- EFL Cup runner-up: 2017–18

Real Betis

- Copa del Rey: 2021–22
- UEFA Conference League runner-up: 2024–25

Barcelona

- La Liga: 2022–23

Spain U21

- UEFA European Under-21 Championship runner-up: 2017

Individual

- UEFA European Under-19 Championship Team of the Tournament: 2013
- PFA Team of the Year: 2015–16 Premier League
