= Gafur Gulberdiyev =

Turkmen footballer

Personal information
- Full name: Gafur Gulberdiyev
- Date of birth: 23 August 1995 (age 31)
- Place of birth: Balkan, Turkmenistan
- Position: Defender

Team information
- Current team: FC Saxan
- Number: 20

Youth career
- Botafogo Football Academy

Senior career*
Years	Team	Apps	(Gls)
2014–2016	Mortágua FC	4	(0)
2016–	FC Saxan	19	(0)
- * Club domestic league appearances and goals as of 30 June 2017

Gafur Gulberdiyev (Russian: Гафур Gulberdiyev born 23 August 1995) is a Turkmen footballer born in Balkan and captain of FC Saxan in Moldova.

== Career ==
He previously played for Mortágua FC, including when they attained promotion to the Campeonato de Portugal. In 2016, he signed for FC Saxan.
