= Felipe Saturnino =

Brazilian footballer (born 1995)

Personal information
- Full name: Felipe Saturnino Gomes
- Date of birth: 10 August 1995 (age 31)
- Place of birth: Rio de Janeiro, Brazil
- Height: 1.80 m (5 ft 11 in)
- Position: Left-back

Team information
- Current team: Brasil de Pelotas

Youth career
- Goiás

Senior career*
Years	Team	Apps	(Gls)
2014–2017	Goiás	31	(1)
2016	→ Rio Claro (loan)	10	(0)
2017	→ Anápolis (loan)		
2018	CA Juventus	7	(0)
2018	Grêmio Novorizontino	0	(0)
2019	Madureira	2	(0)
2019	Vila	19	(1)
2019–2020	Berço	19	(1)
2021–	Brasil de Pelotas	1	(0)
- * Club domestic league appearances and goals as of 26 March 2019

Felipe Saturnino Gomes (born 10 August 1995), known as Felipe Saturnino, is a Brazilian footballer who plays for Brasil de Pelotas as a left-back.

== Club career ==
Born in Rio de Janeiro, Felipe Saturnino finished his formation with Goiás. On 18 October 2014 he made his first team – and Série A – debut, starting in a 0–0 home draw against Grêmio.

In November Felipe Saturnino renewed his link with the club, until 2017.
