= Larissa Šoronda =

Slovenian footballer

Personal information
- Full name: Larissa Šoronda
- Date of birth: 15 October 1995 (age 31)
- Place of birth: Bela Krajina, Slovenia
- Position: Forward

Youth career
- –2013: Krka

Senior career*
Years	Team	Apps	(Gls)
2011–2013	Krka	39	(19)
2013	Radomlje	9	(4)
2014–2016	Rudar Škale	36	(30)
2018	Pomurje	6	(3)

International career
2013	Slovenia U19 (Note: Official UEFA matches only.)	3	(0)
2014	Slovenia	1	(0)
- * Club domestic league appearances and goals

Larissa Šoronda (born 15 October 1995) is a Slovenian football forward.
