= Konrad Szczotka =

Polish footballer

Personal information
- Full name: Konrad Szczotka
- Date of birth: 27 July 1995 (age 31)
- Place of birth: Puławy, Poland
- Height: 1.77 m (5 ft 10 in)
- Position: Midfielder

Team information
- Current team: Powiślanka Lipsko
- Number: 25

Youth career
- 2005–2011: Wisła Puławy

Senior career*
Years	Team	Apps	(Gls)
2011–2020	Wisła Puławy	162	(7)
2020–2021	Lewart Lubartów	26	(1)
2021–2024	Cisowianka Drzewce	77	(44)
2024–	Powiślanka Lipsko	20	(3)
- * Club domestic league appearances and goals as of 14:18, 21 June 2025 (UTC)

Konrad Szczotka (born 27 July 1995) is a Polish professional footballer who plays as a midfielder for regional league club Powiślanka Lipsko.

== Honours ==
Cisowianka Drzewce

- Regional league Lublin: 2022–23
