= Gandelger Ganbold =

Mongolian footballer

Personal information
- Date of birth: 8 August 1995 (age 31)
- Place of birth: Ulaanbaatar, Mongolia
- Height: 1.65 m (5 ft 5 in)
- Position: Midfielder

Team information
- Current team: Deren FC
- Number: 14

Youth career
- 2007–2009: Sinmook Football Academy
- 2009–2010: Gongneung Football Academy
- 2010–2011: Battersea Lions
- 2011–2015: Tottenham Hotspur

Senior career*
| Years | Team | Apps | (Gls) |
| 2015– | Deren FC | | |

International career^{‡}
| 2015– | Mongolia U23 | 3 | (0) |
| 2015– | Mongolia | 1 | (0) |
- * Club domestic league appearances and goals as of 12:57, 19 February 2014 (UTC) ‡ National team caps and goals as of 13:28, 17 September 2016 (UTC)

Gandelger Ganbold (Mongolian: Гандэлгэр Ганболд, born 8 August 1995) is a Mongolian international footballer who plays Deren FC of the Mongolian Premier League, as a midfielder.

== Early life ==
Gandelger was born on 8 August 1995 in Erdenet, Mongolia, to Delgermaa and Ganbold. His family were originally from Erdenet but moved to the capital city of Mongolia in his early childhood. Gandelger studied at Ireedui tsogtsolbor from the age of nine to eleven. He then moved to Seoul, South Korea, with his parents where he studied at Sinmook Football Academy from 2007 to 2009. After his successful time at the Sinmook Football Academy he then moved to Gongneung Football Academy in 2009 to 2010. As a youth, he was considered by some to be the future of the Mongolia national football team.

== Career ==
=== Club ===
In 2010, Ganbold moved to London, England and played for local youth side Battersea Lions FC and became one of the top scorers in the local league. He then had a trial with Queens Park Rangers but was not offered a contract. Later he was signed to a contract by the Tottenham Hotspur Academy in 2011 following a trial which included him scoring two goals in a single match. During his time his time with the club, he worked his way up to the senior reserve "B" squad and trained with the first team occasionally.

In March 2015 it was believed that Ganbold would join fellow Mongolian Murun Altankhuyag at FK Mačva Šabac of the Serbian First League. However, Murun left the club and returned to Mongolia to re-sign with Selenge Press FC after Mačva Šabac were relegated to the Serbian League. His contract was terminated because Serbian rules did not allow non-Serbian nationals to be on the roster of teams in the third division or lower.

In 2015, Ganbold returned to Mongolia and signed for Deren FC of the Mongolian Premier League.

=== International ===
In 2015 Ganbold was named to Mongolia's squad for the match against Timor Leste on 12 March during the opening round of 2018 FIFA World Cup qualification. At that time he was the youngest-ever play to receive a senior call up. He made his debut as a substitute in the match, an eventual 1–4 defeat. He was also part of Mongolia's squad for 2016 AFC U-23 Championship qualification in March 2015.

=== International statistics ===
As of match played 12 March 2015

Mongolia
| Year | Apps | Goals |
|---|---|---|
| 2015 | 1 | 0 |
| 2016 | 0 | 0 |
| Total | 1 | 0 |
