= Nathalie Gonzalez =

Luxembourgish footballer

Personal information
- Date of birth: 9 April 1995 (age 31)
- Position: Midfielder

International career^{‡}
Years	Team	Apps	(Gls)
2014–2017	Luxembourg	7	(0)
- ‡ National team caps and goals as of 19:23, 30 August 2019 (UTC)

Nathalie Gonzalez (born 9 April 1995) is a former Luxembourgish footballer who played as a midfielder and appeared for the Luxembourg women's national team.

== Career ==
Gonzalez has been capped for the Luxembourg national team, appearing for the team during the 2019 FIFA Women's World Cup qualifying cycle.
