= Asarums IF =

Swedish football club

Asarums IF FK
- Full name: Asarums Idrottsförening Fotbollklubb
- Nickname: The Bison
- Short name: Rums
- Founded: 1954
- Ground: Asarums IP; Asarum; Sweden
- Chairman: Thomas Lilja
- Head coach: Paul Scott
- League: Division 2 Östra Götaland
- 2019: Division 2 Östra Götaland, 7th
- Website: https://www.svenskalag.se/asarumsiffk
Home colours

Asarums IF FK is a Swedish football club located in Asarum, Karlshamn Municipality.

== Background ==
Asarums IF FK currently plays in Division 4 Blekinge which is the sixth tier of Swedish football. They play their home matches at the Asarums IP in Asarum.

The club is affiliated to Blekinge Fotbollförbund. Asarums IF have competed in the Svenska Cupen on 17 occasions.

== Season to season ==
Season	Level	Division	Section	Position	Movements
1993	Tier 4	Division 3	Sydöstra Götaland	12th	Relegated
1994	Tier 5	Division 4	Blekinge	4th	
1995	Tier 5	Division 4	Blekinge	9th	
1996	Tier 5	Division 4	Blekinge	13th	Relegated
1997	Tier 6	Division 5	Blekinge		Promoted
1998	Tier 5	Division 4	Blekinge	6th	
1999	Tier 5	Division 4	Blekinge	9th	
2000	Tier 5	Division 4	Blekinge	4th	
2001	Tier 5	Division 4	Blekinge	8th	
2002	Tier 5	Division 4	Blekinge	2nd	Promotion Playoffs
2003	Tier 5	Division 4	Blekinge	3rd	
2004	Tier 5	Division 4	Blekinge	6th	
2005	Tier 5	Division 4	Blekinge	5th	
2006*	Tier 6	Division 4	Blekinge	9th	
2007	Tier 6	Division 4	Blekinge	6th	
2008	Tier 6	Division 4	Blekinge	2nd	
2009	Tier 6	Division 4	Blekinge	2nd	
2010	Tier 6	Division 4	Blekinge	2nd	Promotion Playoffs
2011	Tier 6	Division 4	Blekinge	2nd	Promotion
2012	Tier 5	Division 3	Sydöstra Götaland	5th	
2013	Tier 5	Division 3	Sydöstra Götaland	1st	Promotion

* League restructuring in 2006 resulted in a new division being created at Tier 3 and subsequent divisions dropping a level.
