= Saifoudine Sanali =

Comorian footballer

Personal information
- Full name: Saifoudine Sanali
- Date of birth: June 16, 1995 (age 31)
- Place of birth: Moroni, Comoros
- Height: 1.69 m (5 ft 7 in)
- Position: Left midfielder

Team information
- Current team: Sans Club Actuellement

Youth career
- 2004–2005: US Chanteloup
- 2005–2010: PSG
- 2010–2013: Le Mans

Senior career*
Years	Team	Apps	(Gls)
2013–2015	Guingamp II	13	(1)
2015–2016	Cognac		
2016–2017	AS Lanester		
2017–	La Roche	3	(1)

International career^{‡}
2018–	Comoros	3	(0)
- * Club domestic league appearances and goals as of 30 June 2018 ‡ National team caps and goals as of 30 June 2018

Saifoudine Sanali (born 16 June 1995) is a Comorian professional footballer who plays as a midfielder for the French club us le pontet grand avignon.

Sanali is a youth product of the PSG academy, and has spent his footballing career in the lower leagues of France.

== International career ==
Sanali made his debut for the Comoros national football team in a 1–1 tie in the 2018 COSAFA Cup to Seychelles on 27 May 2018.
