= Billy Whitaker =

English footballer

Personal information
- Full name: William Whitaker
- Date of birth: 7 October 1923
- Place of birth: Chesterfield, England
- Date of death: 29 August 1995 (aged 71)
- Place of death: Chesterfield, England
- Position: Central defender

Senior career*
Years	Team	Apps	(Gls)
1946–1947	Chesterfield	13	(0)
1947–1955	Middlesbrough	177	(1)
- King's Lynn
Total		190	(1)
- * Club domestic league appearances and goals

William Whitaker (1923–1995) was an English professional footballer who played as a defender in the Football League.
