= Luka Špoljarić =

Serbian footballer

Personal information
- Date of birth: 13 September 1995 (age 31)
- Place of birth: Limassol, Cyprus
- Position: Midfielder

Team information
- Current team: Aiolikos

Youth career
- 2014–2015: Genoa

Senior career*
Years	Team	Apps	(Gls)
2017–2018	Santarcangelo	8	(0)
2018–2019	Apollon Pontus	10	(0)
2019	Slavia Sofia	2	(0)
2019–	Aiolikos		
- * Club domestic league appearances and goals as of 15:48, 20 July 2021 (UTC)

Luka Špoljarić (born 13 September 1995) is a Serbian professional footballer who plays as a midfielder for Greek club Aiolikos.

== Career ==
Špoljarić joined the youth system of Serie A side Genoa in 2014. In 2017, he signed for Santarcangelo in Serie C, where he made eight league appearances. On 27 August 2017, Špoljarić debuted for Santarcangelo in a 1–0 loss to Pordenone.

== Career statistics ==
=== Club ===
As of match played 16 July 2021

Appearances and goals by club, season and competition
Club	Season	League			National Cup (Note: Includes Greek Football Cup)		Total	
Club	Season	Division	Apps	Goals	Apps	Goals	Apps	Goals
Santarcangelo	2017–18	Serie C	8	0	—		8	0
Apollon Pontus	2018–19	Football League	10	0	3	0	13	0
Slavia Sofia	2018–19	First Professional League	2	0	—		2	0
Career total			20	0	3	0	23	0
