= Vanessa Wahlen =

German footballer (born 1995)

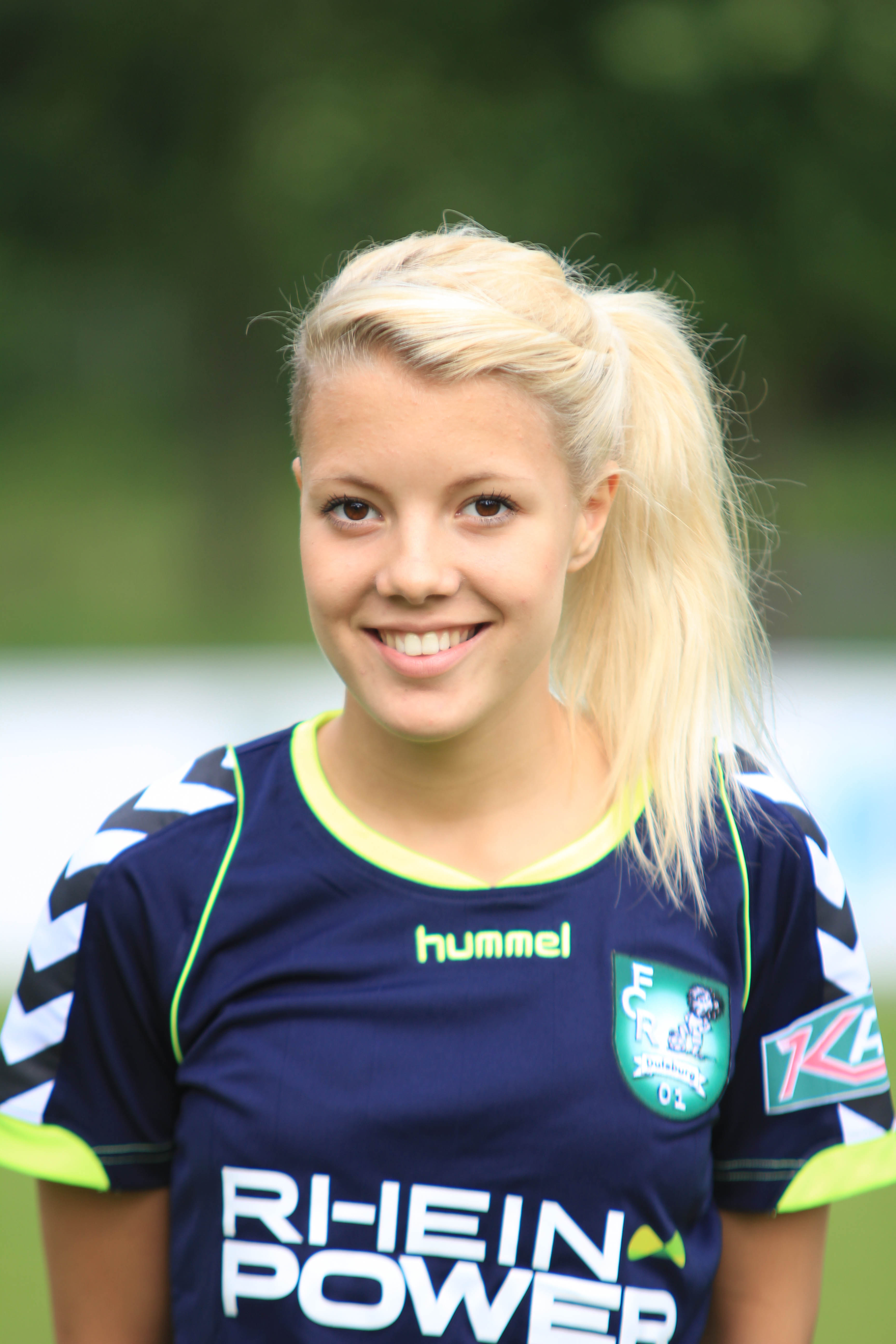
- Vanessa Wahlen in 2012

Personal information
- Date of birth: 21 August 1995 (age 31)
- Place of birth: Düsseldorf, Germany
- Height: 1.67 m (5 ft 6 in)
- Position: Midfielder

Vanessa Wahlen (21 August 1995) is a German retired football player who played for Bayer 04 Leverkusen.
