= Robert Obst =

Polish footballer (born 1995)

Personal information
- Date of birth: 6 July 1995 (age 31)
- Place of birth: Szczecin, Poland
- Height: 1.92 m (6 ft 4 in)
- Position: Centre-back

Team information
- Current team: Kluczevia Stargard

Youth career
- –2013: Pogoń Szczecin

Senior career*
Years	Team	Apps	(Gls)
2013–2018	Pogoń Szczecin II	68	(9)
2015–2018	Pogoń Szczecin	13	(1)
2017–2018	→ Wigry Suwałki (loan)	25	(1)
2018–2019	Ruch Chorzów	24	(1)
2019–2020	Znicz Pruszków	28	(1)
2020–2021	BSV Schwarz-Weiß Rehden	7	(1)
2021	Olimpia Grudziądz	18	(0)
2021–2023	Kotwica Kołobrzeg	45	(1)
2023	Gwardia Koszalin	17	(0)
2024–2026	Świt Szczecin	61	(6)
2026–	Kluczevia Stargard	0	(0)
- * Club domestic league appearances and goals as of 19:02, 31 May 2026 (UTC)

Robert Obst (born 6 July 1995) is a Polish professional footballer who plays as a centre-back for III liga club Kluczevia Stargard.

== Honours ==
Kotwica Kołobrzeg

- III liga, group II: 2021–22

Świt Szczecin

- III liga, group II: 2023–24
- Polish Cup (West Pomerania regionals): 2023–24
