= Karmen Ulbin =

Slovenian footballer

Personal information
- Date of birth: 19 February 1995 (age 31)
- Position: Defender

International career^{‡}
Years	Team	Apps	(Gls)
- Slovenia
- ‡ National team caps and goals as of 19:49, 30 August 2019 (UTC)

Karmen Ulbin (born 19 February 1995) is a Slovenian footballer who plays as a defender and has appeared for the Slovenia women's national team.

== Career ==
Ulbin has been capped for the Slovenia national team, appearing for the team during the 2019 FIFA Women's World Cup qualifying cycle.
