= Yves Nyami =

Democratic Republic of the Congo footballer (born 1995)

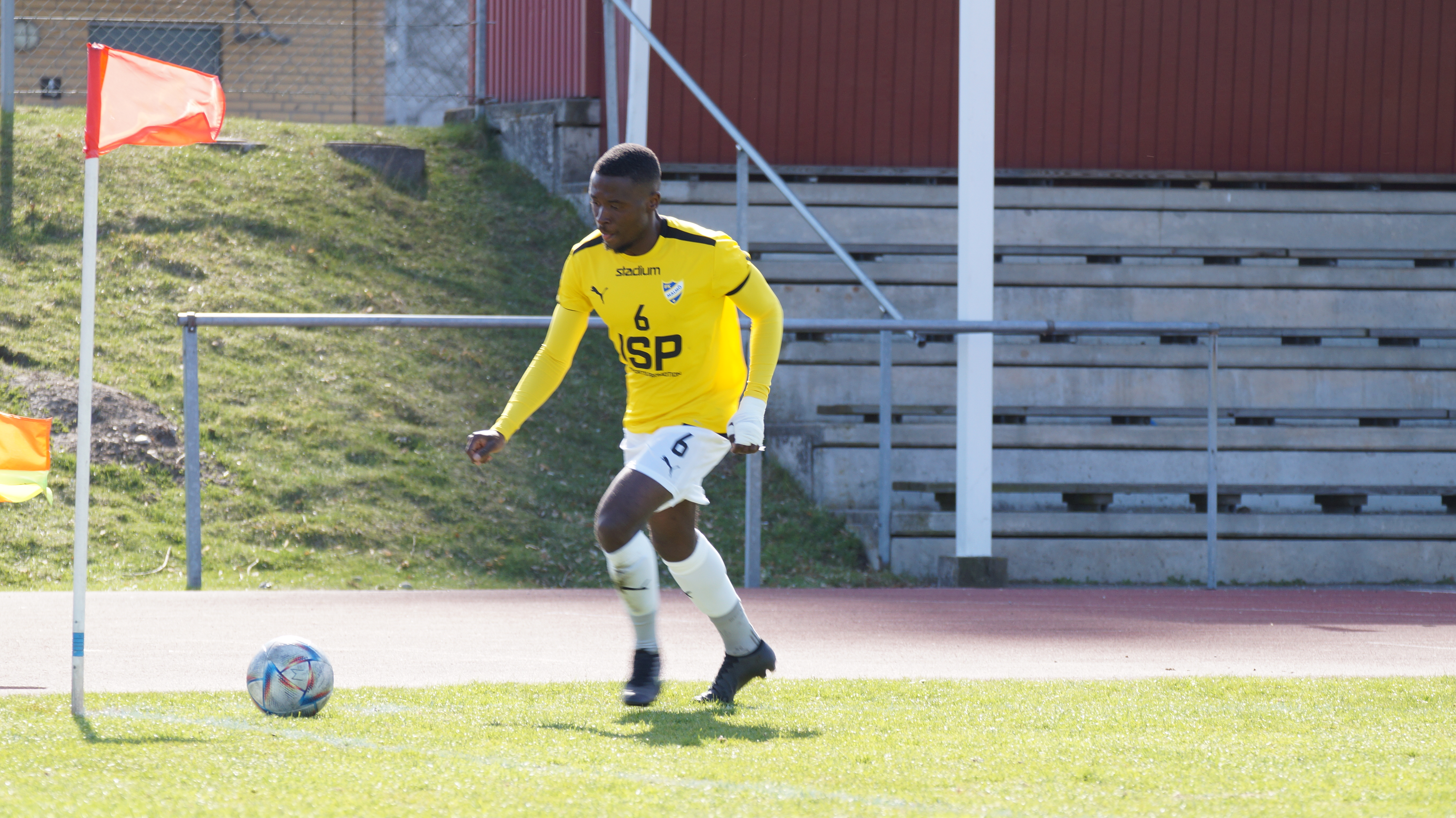
- Nyami playing for IFK Malmö

Personal information
- Date of birth: 24 August 1995 (age 31)
- Place of birth: Villeurbanne, France
- Height: 1.73 m (5 ft 8 in)
- Position: Midfielder

Senior career*
Years	Team	Apps	(Gls)
2015	Bourg-Péronnas		
- Inverness Caledonian Thistle
- Edusport Academy
- New York Red Bulls II
2016–2017	Glacis United	5	(0)
2017–2018	Barbadás	5	(0)
2018	Åtvidabergs FF		
2021–2022	ASD Virtus Cilento		
2022–2023	IFK Malmö		

International career
- Congo U17
- * Club domestic league appearances and goals

Yves Nyami (born 24 August 1995) is a DR Congolese footballer who plays as a midfielder.

== Early life ==
Nyami was born in Villeurbanne, France to a family with roots in Congo.

== Club career ==
Nyami started his career with French lower league club Bourg-Péronnas.

He moved to Scotland to with Inverness Caledonian Thistle and Edusport Academy. Following a stint with New York Red Bulls II he made five appearances in the Gibraltar National League for Glacis United in the 2016–17 season.

In June 2017 it was announced he would join Barbadás, where he made five appearances in the Tercera División in the first half of the 2017–18 season.

In the summer of 2018 he signed with Swedish club Åtvidabergs FF, before leaving the club after a few weeks.

He joined Swedish side IFK Malmö from Italian club ASD Virtus Cilento in December 2022.

== International career ==
Nyami played for the Congo U17 national team.

== Personal life ==
Nyami started a car sales company in his hometown Lyon when he returned to France from Åtvidabergs FF.
