= Roman Artemuk =

Ukrainian footballer

Personal information
- Date of birth: 12 August 1995 (age 31)
- Place of birth: Novovolynsk, Volyn Oblast, Ukraine
- Height: 1.74 m (5 ft 9 in)
- Position: Striker

Team information
- Current team: Grün-Weiss Deggendorf

Youth career
- 2004: Youth Sportive School Novovolynsk
- 2005–2007: Nyva Vinnytsia
- 2007–2008: FK Tempo Prague
- 2008–2009: FK Meteor Prague VIII
- 2009–2014: FC Bohemians 1905

Senior career*
Years	Team	Apps	(Gls)
2014–2017	FC Bohemians 1905	1	(0)
2016	→ FK Dobrovice (loan)	4	(0)
2017–2018	SK Benešov	10	(0)
2018	Polaban Nymburk	15	(3)
2018–2019	Olympia Radotín	14	(0)
2019–	Grün-Weiss Deggendorf		
- * Club domestic league appearances and goals as of 10:37, 8 May 2026 (UTC)

Roman Artemuk (Ukrainian: Роман Артемук; born 12 August 1995) is a Ukrainian footballer who plays as a striker for Grün-Weiss Deggendorf in Germany.

== Career ==
Born in Novovolynsk, Artemuk moved to the Czech Republic with his family at the age of 7. He came through the FC Bohemians 1905 academy.

He made his debut for FC Bohemians entering as a second-half substitute against Sparta Prague on 25 July 2014 in the Czech First League.

On 16 March 2018, Artemuk joined Polaban Nymburk. He played for the club until 2 August 2018, where he joined Olympia Radotín. At the beginning of February 2019, Artemuk joined German club SpVgg Grün-Weiss Deggendorf.
