= Everton (footballer, born August 1995) =

Brazilian footballer (born 1995)

Personal information
- Date of birth: 21 August 1995 (age 31)
- Place of birth: Goiânia, Brazil
- Height: 1.75 m (5 ft 9 in)
- Position: Right-back

Team information
- Current team: Capital CF

Youth career
- Goiás

Senior career*
Years	Team	Apps	(Gls)
2015–2018	Goiás	9	(0)
2017	→ URT (loan)	0	(0)
2017–2018	→ Aparecidense (loan)	4	(0)
2019	Aimoré	0	(0)
2019–2020	Iporá	10	(0)
2020–	Capital CF	0	(0)
- * Club domestic league appearances and goals as of 13:25, 21 September 2020 (UTC)

Everton Pereira (born 21 August 1995), sometimes known as just Everton, is a Brazilian footballer who plays for Capital CF as a right-back.

== Career ==
Born in Goiânia, Goiás, Everton Pereira finished his formation with Goiás. On 24 January 2015 he was promoted to the main squad by manager Wagner Lopes.

Everton Pereira made his Série A debut on 10 May, starting in a 0–0 away draw against Vasco.
