= Felipe Ribeiro (footballer) =

Brazilian footballer (born 1995)

Filipe Ribeiro
Personal information
- Full name: Filipe Ribeiro do Nascimento
- Date of birth: 27 May 1995 (age 31)
- Place of birth: São Paulo, Brazil
- Height: 1.84 m (6 ft 0 in)
- Position: Midfielder

Team information
- Current team: Volta Redonda Futebol Clube
- Number: 10

Youth career
- –2014: Osasco Audax

Senior career*
Years	Team	Apps	(Gls)
2015–2016	Audax Rio	1	(0)
2016	Paulista	2	(1)
2017	Sergipe	14	(6)
2018	Sporting CP B	32	(9)
2019–	Leixões	9	(1)
2021	→ Desportiva (loan)	6	(2)
- * Club domestic league appearances and goals as of 18:02, 21 June 2019 (UTC)

Filipe Ribeiro do Nascimento (born 27 May 1995), commonly known as Filipe Ribeiro, is a Brazilian footballer who plays as a midfielder.

== Career statistics ==
=== Club ===
As of 21 June 2020.

Club	Season	Total		Apps	Goals		
Club	Season	Osasco Audax	2016	–		2	1
Sergipe	2017	16	6	–			
Sporting Clube de Portugal B	2017–18	32	11				
Leixões	2019	9	2				
Career total			57	20			
