= List of FA Community Shield matches =

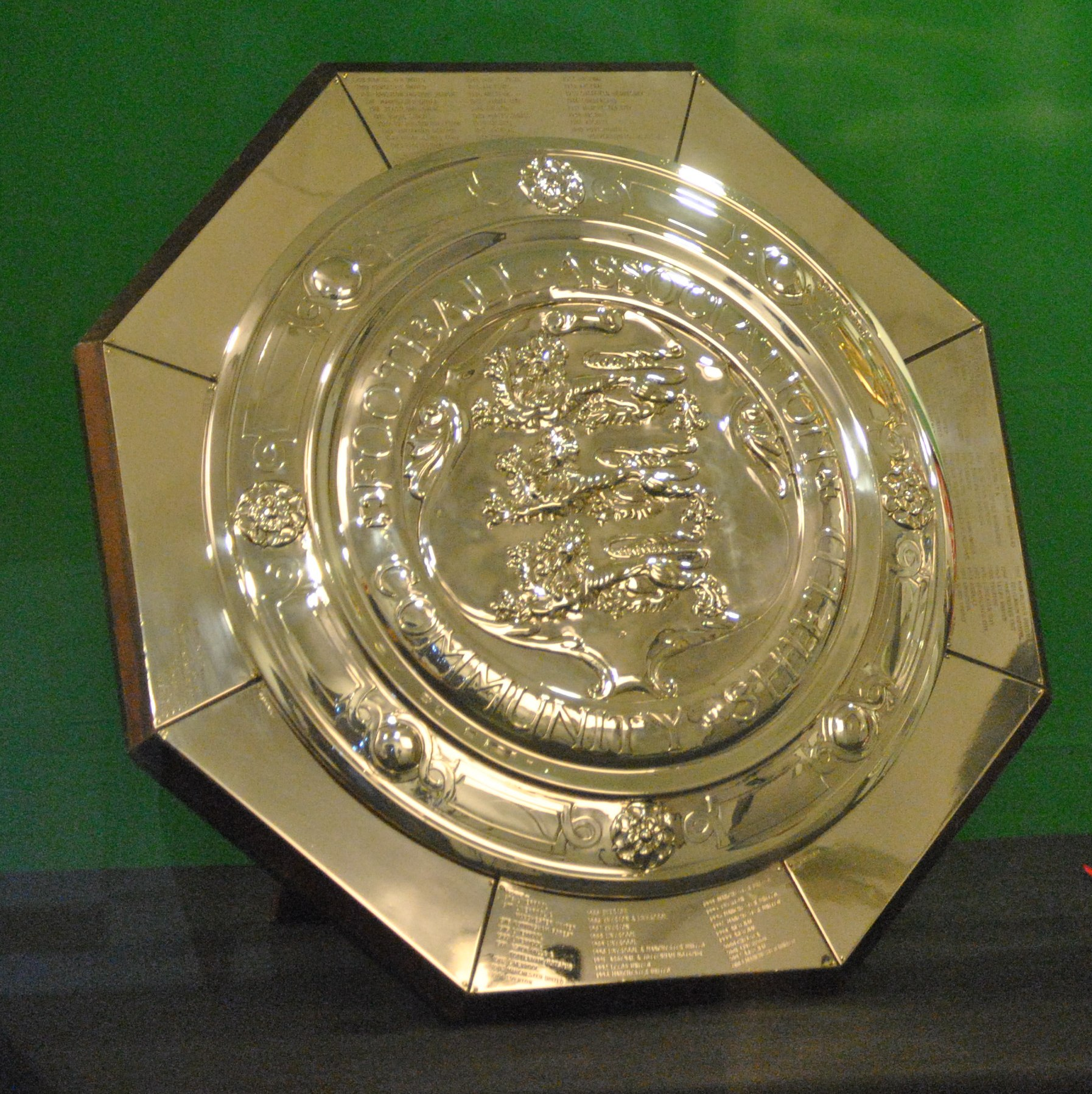
The FA Community Shield, which the winner receives.

The Football Association Community Shield (formerly the Charity Shield, up to and including the 2001 edition) is an annual association football match organised by the Football Association and presently contested between the Premier League champions and FA Cup winners. In the event where a club achieves the domestic double, it goes on to face the league runners-up instead. The match is played every August, serving as England's super cup equivalent, and is regarded as the "curtain-raiser" and the first competitive game of each top-flight English football season. Since 1974, all but seven of the matches have been held at either the original or new Wembley stadiums. (Note: From 2001–2006, the Millennium Stadium was the venue for Shield matches while the new Wembley Stadium was being constructed. Villa Park replaced Wembley Stadium as the venue for the 2012 Community Shield due to the latter's hosting of the Olympic men's football tournament final the previous day. King Power Stadium replaced Wembley Stadium as the venue for the 2022 Community Shield due to the latter's hosting of the UEFA Women's Euro 2022 final the following day. The Millennium Stadium replaced Wembley Stadium as the venue for the 2026 Community Shield due to the latter's holding The Weeknd concerts from 14 to 19 August as part of After Hours til Dawn Tour.) Stamford Bridge, which was the venue where the inaugural Charity Shield was played in 1908, has hosted the second-most finals with 11. The current winners are Arsenal, who defeated Manchester City 3–0 in the 2026 fixture.

The format of the competition has been modified many times over the years. The game was initially contested between the champions of the Football League and Southern Football League from its inception until 1912, after which both professional and amateurs players participated. Following a six-year suspension due to the First World War, the competition resumed in 1920 with a game between the champions of the Football League First and Second Divisions. The following year saw the match arrangement changed again to become a contest between the Football League champions and the winners of the FA Cup, switching several more times between the amateur/professional and league champion/FA Cup winners matches during the 1920s. From 1930 onwards, it settled to a standard fixture between the FA Cup winners and Football League champions, except for three occasions. In 1950, the England World Cup squad played the England team who toured Canada that summer, while double-winning Tottenham Hotspur played an "F.A. Selected XI" in 1961 that was described by The Times as being an "England team masquerading". A decade later, in 1971, Arsenal won the double and opted against contesting the Shield in favour of playing in more profitable friendlies in Europe; Leicester City – the champions of the Second Division – took their place.

Manchester United hold the record for the most victories, winning the competition 21 times since its inception. (Note: Manchester United won 17 titles outright and shared 4 titles.) They also hold the distinction of having the most appearances (31) and most losses (10). Although the Shield has had its share of historical moments – from Eric Cantona's first career hat-trick in 1992 to Manchester United's first loss of 1999 ending a streak of 33 consecutive games without a defeat, it has been dismissed by some as a ceremonial friendly that is not on par with other domestic honours in terms of prestige. Winning the Shield has proven to be an unreliable indicator of success in the forthcoming season. Since the establishment of the Premier League in 1992, only eight clubs that won the Shield proceeded to become league champions in the same season, the last being Manchester City in 2018–19. Indeed, Gianluca Vialli was sacked only weeks after guiding Chelsea to the victory in the 2000 match, following a lacklustre start to the season.

Prior to the 2008 FA Community Shield, Manchester United manager Sir Alex Ferguson summarised his opinion of the competition: "The Community Shield is a prestigious match but I have used players in it who were not quite fit... it's always a game we never quite use as a do or die thing; we use it as a barometer for fitness". Others, however, continue to recognise the status of the match as the first official game and trophy of the domestic season. Ahead of the 2016 FA Community Shield against Manchester United, Leicester City manager Claudio Ranieri asked, "Why do you say this question, a friendly? When is the Community Shield a friendly? Of course we will be at the maximum and Manchester United will be at their maximum. The two teams want to win. I am very excited." The following year, Chelsea manager Antonio Conte affirmed the significance of the cup, stating "It is not a friendly game. It is an official game and there is a trophy so for us it must be important" ahead of his side's clash with Arsenal, the team that had denied his club the double the previous season. Likewise in 2018, Manchester City manager Pep Guardiola referred to his side's clash with Chelsea in the competition as "the first final" of the season.

== Results ==
Key
| & | Title was shared after match finished in a draw |
| p | Match decided by penalty shoot-out after full-time (Note: If the match finishes in a draw after 90 minutes, no extra time is played and the teams proceed directly to a penalty shoot-out.) |
| ‡ | Guest team was established for this tournament only |

FA Community Shield winners
| Ed. | Year | Winners | Score | Runners-up | Venue | Attendance | Ref(s) |
|---|---|---|---|---|---|---|---|
| 1 | 1908 | Manchester United | 1–1 | Queens Park Rangers | Stamford Bridge | 6,000 | |
| 1 | 1908 | Manchester United | 4–0 (replay) | Queens Park Rangers | Stamford Bridge | 50,000 | |
| 2 | 1909 | Newcastle United | 2–0 | Northampton Town | Stamford Bridge | 7,000 | |
| 3 | 1910 | Brighton and Hove Albion | 1–0 | Aston Villa | Stamford Bridge | 13,000 | |
| 4 | 1911 | Manchester United | 8–4 | Swindon Town | Stamford Bridge | 10,000 | |
| 5 | 1912 | Blackburn Rovers | 2–1 | Queens Park Rangers | White Hart Lane | 7,100 | |
| 6 | 1913 | English Professionals XI^{‡} | 7–2 | English Amateurs XI^{‡} | The Den (original) | 15,000 (Note: This attendance figure is not exact and is only an approximation.) | |
| 7 | 1920 | West Bromwich Albion | 2–0 | Tottenham Hotspur | White Hart Lane | 38,168 | |
| 8 | 1921 | Tottenham Hotspur | 2–0 | Burnley | White Hart Lane | 18,000 | |
| 9 | 1922 | Huddersfield Town | 1–0 | Liverpool | Old Trafford | 20,000 | |
| 10 | 1923 | English Professionals XI^{‡} | 2–0 | English Amateurs XI^{‡} | Stamford Bridge | 11,000 | |
| 11 | 1924 | English Professionals XI^{‡} | 3–1 | English Amateurs XI^{‡} | Highbury Stadium | 10,000 | |
| 12 | 1925 | English Amateurs XI^{‡} | 6–1 | English Professionals XI^{‡} | White Hart Lane | 5,000 | |
| 13 | 1926 | English Amateurs XI^{‡} | 6–3 | English Professionals XI^{‡} | Maine Road | 1,500 | |
| 14 | 1927 | Cardiff City | 2–1 | Corinthian | Stamford Bridge | 16,500 | |
| 15 | 1928 | Everton | 2–1 | Blackburn Rovers | Old Trafford | 4,000 | |
| 16 | 1929 | English Professionals XI^{‡} | 3–0 | English Amateurs XI^{‡} | The Den (original) | 6,000 | |
| 17 | 1930 | Arsenal | 2–1 | Sheffield Wednesday | Stamford Bridge | 18,000 | |
| 18 | 1931 | Arsenal | 1–0 | West Bromwich Albion | Villa Park | 21,276 | |
| 19 | 1932 | Everton | 5–3 | Newcastle United | St James' Park | 10,000 | |
| 20 | 1933 | Arsenal | 3–0 | Everton | Goodison Park | 20,000 | |
| 21 | 1934 | Arsenal | 4–0 | Manchester City | Highbury Stadium | 10,888 | |
| 22 | 1935 | Sheffield Wednesday | 1–0 | Arsenal | Highbury Stadium | 15,000 | |
| 23 | 1936 | Sunderland | 2–1 | Arsenal | Roker Park | 15,000 | |
| 24 | 1937 | Manchester City | 2–0 | Sunderland | Maine Road | 14,000 | |
| 25 | 1938 | Arsenal | 2–1 | Preston North End | Highbury Stadium | 7,233 | |
| 26 | 1948 | Arsenal | 4–3 | Manchester United | Highbury Stadium | 31,000 | |
| 27 | 1949 | Portsmouth | 1–1^{&} | Wolverhampton Wanderers | Highbury Stadium | 35,140 | |
| 28 | 1950 | England World Cup XI^{‡} | 4–2 | FA Canadian Touring Team^{‡} | Stamford Bridge | 38,468 | |
| 29 | 1951 | Tottenham Hotspur | 2–1 | Newcastle United | White Hart Lane | 27,760 | |
| 30 | 1952 | Manchester United | 4–2 | Newcastle United | Old Trafford | 11,381 | |
| 31 | 1953 | Arsenal | 3–1 | Blackpool | Highbury Stadium | 39,853 | |
| 32 | 1954 | West Bromwich Albion | 4–4^{&} | Wolverhampton Wanderers | Molineux Stadium | 45,035 | |
| 33 | 1955 | Chelsea | 3–0 | Newcastle United | Stamford Bridge | 12,802 | |
| 34 | 1956 | Manchester United | 1–0 | Manchester City | Maine Road | 30,495 | |
| 35 | 1957 | Manchester United | 4–0 | Aston Villa | Old Trafford | 27,923 | |
| 36 | 1958 | Bolton Wanderers | 4–1 | Wolverhampton Wanderers | Burnden Park | 36,029 | |
| 37 | 1959 | Wolverhampton Wanderers | 3–1 | Nottingham Forest | Molineux Stadium | 32,329 | |
| 38 | 1960 | Burnley | 2–2^{&} | Wolverhampton Wanderers | Turf Moor | 19,873 | |
| 39 | 1961 | Tottenham Hotspur | 3–2 | FA Select XI^{‡} | White Hart Lane | 36,593 | |
| 40 | 1962 | Tottenham Hotspur | 5–1 | Ipswich Town | Portman Road | 20,067 | |
| 41 | 1963 | Everton | 4–0 | Manchester United | Goodison Park | 54,844 | |
| 42 | 1964 | Liverpool | 2–2^{&} | West Ham United | Anfield | 38,858 | |
| 43 | 1965 | Liverpool | 2–2^{&} | Manchester United | Old Trafford | 48,502 | |
| 44 | 1966 | Liverpool | 1–0 | Everton | Goodison Park | 63,329 | |
| 45 | 1967 | Manchester United | 3–3^{&} | Tottenham Hotspur | Old Trafford | 54,106 | |
| 46 | 1968 | Manchester City | 6–1 | West Bromwich Albion | Maine Road | 35,510 | |
| 47 | 1969 | Leeds United | 2–1 | Manchester City | Elland Road | 39,835 | |
| 48 | 1970 | Everton | 2–1 | Chelsea | Stamford Bridge | 43,547 | |
| 49 | 1971 | Leicester City | 1–0 | Liverpool | Filbert Street | 25,104 | |
| 50 | 1972 | Manchester City | 1–0 | Aston Villa | Villa Park | 34,859 | |
| 51 | 1973 | Burnley | 1–0 | Manchester City | Maine Road | 23,988 | |
| 52 | 1974 | Liverpool | 1–1 (6–5 p) | Leeds United | Wembley Stadium (original) | 67,000 | |
| 53 | 1975 | Derby County | 2–0 | West Ham United | Wembley Stadium (original) | 59,000 | |
| 54 | 1976 | Liverpool | 1–0 | Southampton | Wembley Stadium (original) | 76,500 | |
| 55 | 1977 | Liverpool | 0–0^{&} | Manchester United | Wembley Stadium (original) | 82,000 | |
| 56 | 1978 | Nottingham Forest | 5–0 | Ipswich Town | Wembley Stadium (original) | 68,000 | |
| 57 | 1979 | Liverpool | 3–1 | Arsenal | Wembley Stadium (original) | 92,800 | |
| 58 | 1980 | Liverpool | 1–0 | West Ham United | Wembley Stadium (original) | 90,000 | |
| 59 | 1981 | Aston Villa | 2–2^{&} | Tottenham Hotspur | Wembley Stadium (original) | 92,500 | |
| 60 | 1982 | Liverpool | 1–0 | Tottenham Hotspur | Wembley Stadium (original) | 82,500 | |
| 61 | 1983 | Manchester United | 2–0 | Liverpool | Wembley Stadium (original) | 92,000 | |
| 62 | 1984 | Everton | 1–0 | Liverpool | Wembley Stadium (original) | 100,000 | |
| 63 | 1985 | Everton | 2–0 | Manchester United | Wembley Stadium (original) | 82,000 | |
| 64 | 1986 | Everton | 1–1^{&} | Liverpool | Wembley Stadium (original) | 88,231 | |
| 65 | 1987 | Everton | 1–0 | Coventry City | Wembley Stadium (original) | 88,000 | |
| 66 | 1988 | Liverpool | 2–1 | Wimbledon | Wembley Stadium (original) | 54,887 | |
| 67 | 1989 | Liverpool | 1–0 | Arsenal | Wembley Stadium (original) | 63,149 | |
| 68 | 1990 | Liverpool | 1–1^{&} | Manchester United | Wembley Stadium (original) | 66,558 | |
| 69 | 1991 | Arsenal | 0–0^{&} | Tottenham Hotspur | Wembley Stadium (original) | 65,483 | |
| 70 | 1992 | Leeds United | 4–3 | Liverpool | Wembley Stadium (original) | 61,291 | |
| 71 | 1993 | Manchester United | 1–1 (5–4 p) | Arsenal | Wembley Stadium (original) | 66,519 | |
| 72 | 1994 | Manchester United | 2–0 | Blackburn Rovers | Wembley Stadium (original) | 60,402 | |
| 73 | 1995 | Everton | 1–0 | Blackburn Rovers | Wembley Stadium (original) | 40,149 | |
| 74 | 1996 | Manchester United | 4–0 | Newcastle United | Wembley Stadium (original) | 73,214 | |
| 75 | 1997 | Manchester United | 1–1 (4–2 p) | Chelsea | Wembley Stadium (original) | 73,636 | |
| 76 | 1998 | Arsenal | 3–0 | Manchester United | Wembley Stadium (original) | 67,342 | |
| 77 | 1999 | Arsenal | 2–1 | Manchester United | Wembley Stadium (original) | 70,185 | |
| 78 | 2000 | Chelsea | 2–0 | Manchester United | Wembley Stadium (original) | 65,148 | |
| 79 | 2001 | Liverpool | 2–1 | Manchester United | Millennium Stadium | 70,227 | |
| 80 | 2002 | Arsenal | 1–0 | Liverpool | Millennium Stadium | 67,337 | |
| 81 | 2003 | Manchester United | 1–1 (4–3 p) | Arsenal | Millennium Stadium | 59,923 | |
| 82 | 2004 | Arsenal | 3–1 | Manchester United | Millennium Stadium | 63,317 | |
| 83 | 2005 | Chelsea | 2–1 | Arsenal | Millennium Stadium | 58,014 | |
| 84 | 2006 | Liverpool | 2–1 | Chelsea | Millennium Stadium | 56,275 | |
| 85 | 2007 | Manchester United | 1–1 (3–0 p) | Chelsea | Wembley Stadium | 80,731 | |
| 86 | 2008 | Manchester United | 0–0 (3–1 p) | Portsmouth | Wembley Stadium | 84,808 | |
| 87 | 2009 | Chelsea | 2–2 (4–1 p) | Manchester United | Wembley Stadium | 85,896 | |
| 88 | 2010 | Manchester United | 3–1 | Chelsea | Wembley Stadium | 84,623 | |
| 89 | 2011 | Manchester United | 3–2 | Manchester City | Wembley Stadium | 77,169 | |
| 90 | 2012 | Manchester City | 3–2 | Chelsea | Villa Park | 36,394 | |
| 91 | 2013 | Manchester United | 2–0 | Wigan Athletic | Wembley Stadium | 80,235 | |
| 92 | 2014 | Arsenal | 3–0 | Manchester City | Wembley Stadium | 71,523 | |
| 93 | 2015 | Arsenal | 1–0 | Chelsea | Wembley Stadium | 85,437 | |
| 94 | 2016 | Manchester United | 2–1 | Leicester City | Wembley Stadium | 85,437 | |
| 95 | 2017 | Arsenal | 1–1 (4–1 p) | Chelsea | Wembley Stadium | 83,325 | |
| 96 | 2018 | Manchester City | 2–0 | Chelsea | Wembley Stadium | 72,724 | |
| 97 | 2019 | Manchester City | 1–1 (5–4 p) | Liverpool | Wembley Stadium | 77,565 | |
| 98 | 2020 | Arsenal | 1–1 (5–4 p) | Liverpool | Wembley Stadium | 0 (Note: The 2020 FA Community Shield was played behind closed doors due to the COVID-19 pandemic in the United Kingdom.) | |
| 99 | 2021 | Leicester City | 1–0 | Manchester City | Wembley Stadium | 45,602 | |
| 100 | 2022 | Liverpool | 3–1 | Manchester City | King Power Stadium | 28,545 | |
| 101 | 2023 | Arsenal | 1–1 (4–1 p) | Manchester City | Wembley Stadium | 81,145 | |
| 102 | 2024 | Manchester City | 1–1 (7–6 p) | Manchester United | Wembley Stadium | 78,416 | |
| 103 | 2025 | Crystal Palace | 2–2 (3–2 p) | Liverpool | Wembley Stadium | 82,645 | |
| 104 | 2026 | Arsenal | 3–0 | Manchester City | Millennium Stadium | 58,056 | |

== Results by club ==
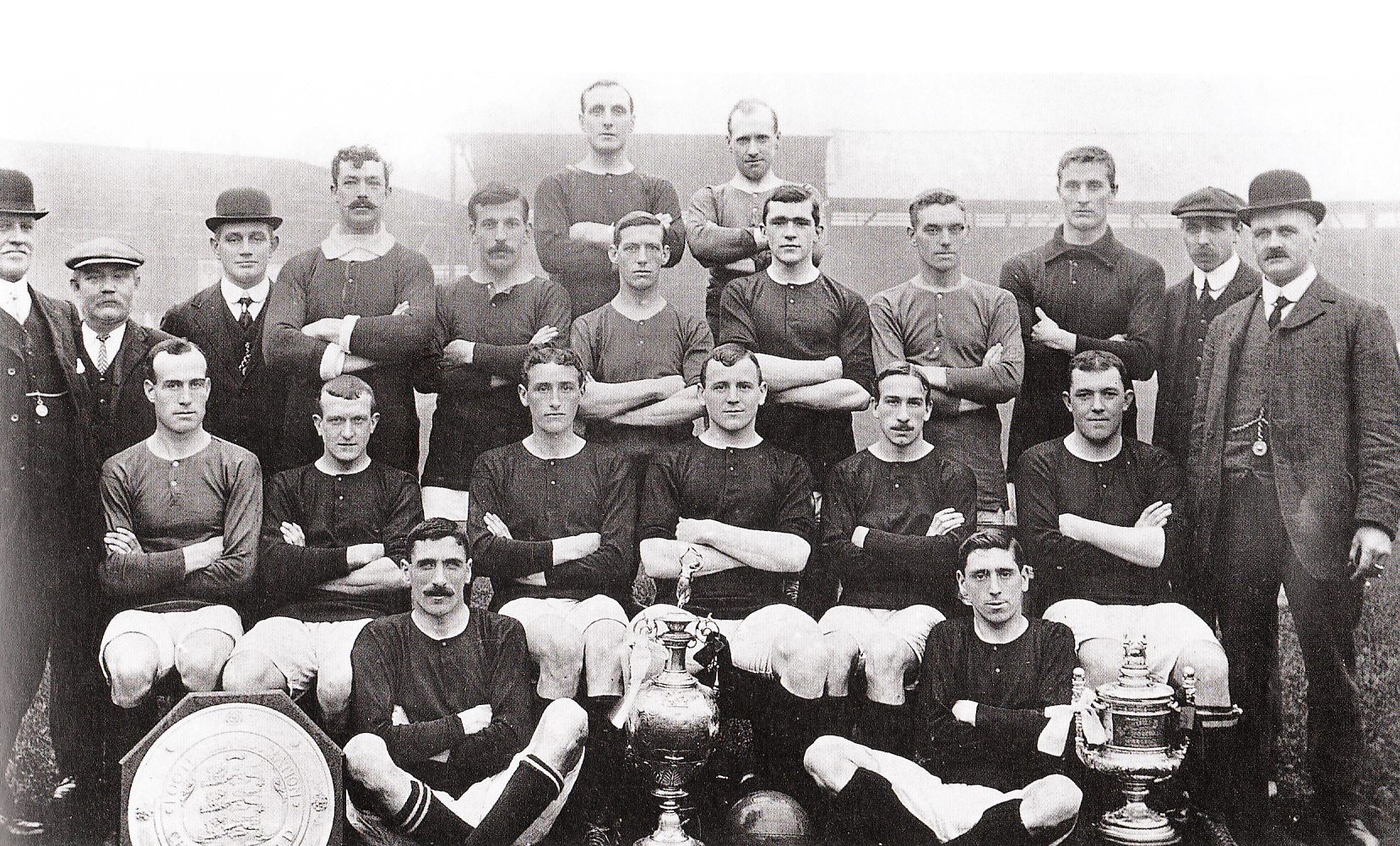
Manchester United won the first FA Charity Shield in 1908 (trophy pictured at the front left).

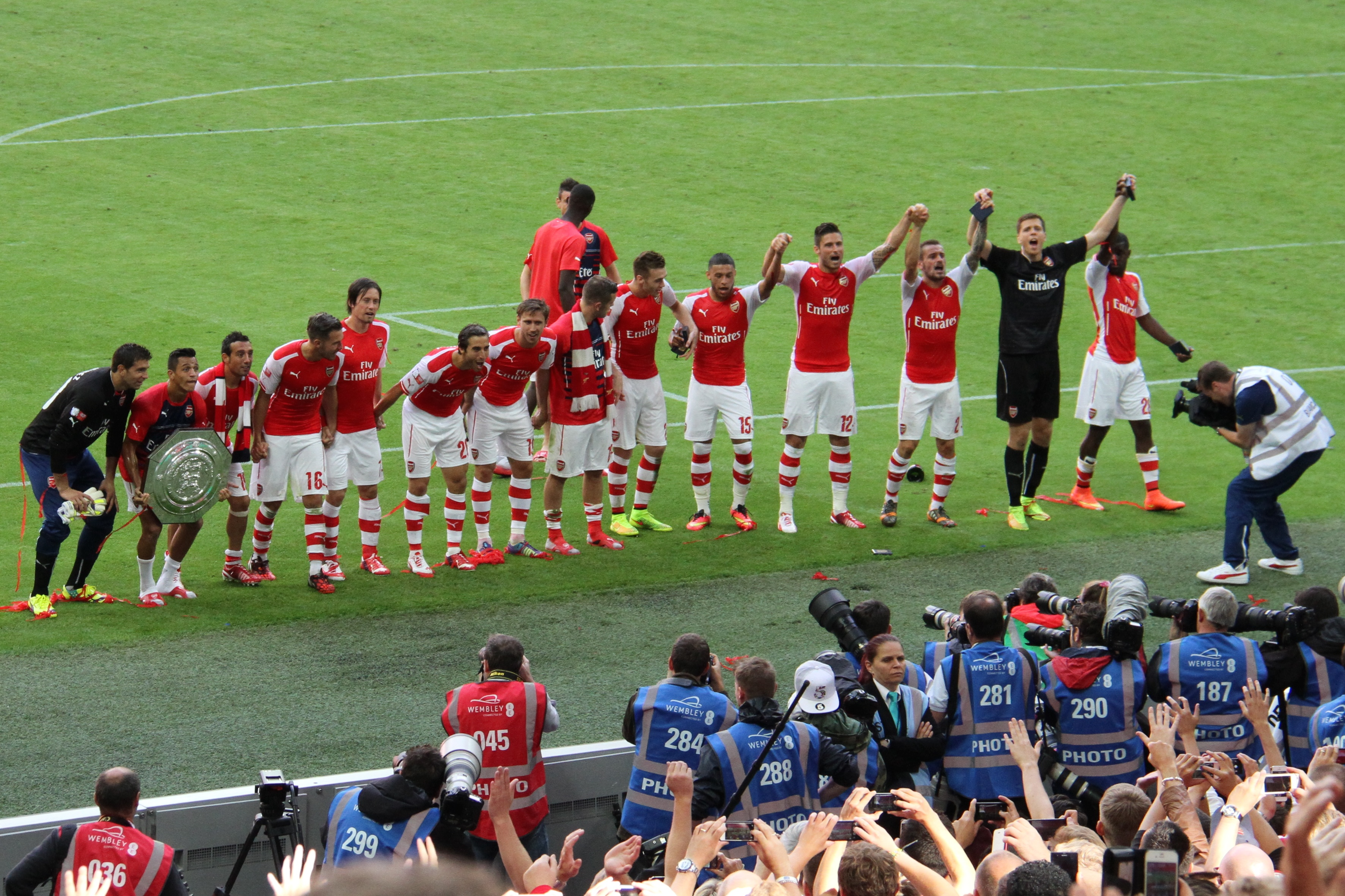
Arsenal (team pictured after winning in 2014) are second for all-time in Shields won (18).

Teams shown in italics are no longer in existence, are still in existence but relocated, or were established only for the purpose of playing in these matches.

FA Community Shield winners by club
| Club | Wins | Last final won | Runners-up | Last final lost | Total appearances |
|---|---|---|---|---|---|
| Manchester United | 21 (Note: Includes four shared titles after match ended in a draw.) | 2016 | 10 | 2024 | 31 |
| Arsenal | 18 (Note: Includes one shared title after match ended in a draw.) | 2026 | 7 | 2005 | 25 |
| Liverpool | 16 (Note: Includes five shared titles after match ended in a draw.) | 2022 | 9 | 2025 | 25 |
| Everton | 9 | 1995 | 2 | 1966 | 11 |
| Manchester City | 7 | 2024 | 10 | 2026 | 17 |
| Tottenham Hotspur | 7 (Note: Includes three shared titles after match ended in a draw.) | 1991 | 2 | 1982 | 9 |
| Chelsea | 4 | 2009 | 9 | 2018 | 13 |
| English Professionals XI | 4 | 1929 | 2 | 1926 | 6 |
| Wolverhampton Wanderers | 4 | 1960 | 1 | 1958 | 5 |
| English Amateurs XI | 2 | 1926 | 4 | 1929 | 6 |
| West Bromwich Albion | 2 | 1954 | 2 | 1968 | 4 |
| Burnley | 2 | 1973 | 1 | 1921 | 3 |
| Leeds United | 2 | 1992 | 1 | 1974 | 3 |
| Leicester City | 2 | 2021 | 1 | 2016 | 3 |
| Newcastle United | 1 | 1909 | 5 | 1996 | 6 |
| Aston Villa | 1 | 1981 | 3 | 1972 | 4 |
| Blackburn Rovers | 1 | 1912 | 3 | 1995 | 4 |
| West Ham United | 1 | 1964 | 2 | 1980 | 3 |
| Sheffield Wednesday | 1 | 1935 | 1 | 1930 | 2 |
| Sunderland | 1 | 1936 | 1 | 1937 | 2 |
| Portsmouth | 1 | 1949 | 1 | 2008 | 2 |
| Nottingham Forest | 1 | 1978 | 1 | 1959 | 2 |
| Brighton and Hove Albion | 1 | 1910 | 0 | — | 1 |
| Huddersfield Town | 1 | 1922 | 0 | — | 1 |
| Cardiff City | 1 | 1927 | 0 | — | 1 |
| English World Cup XI | 1 | 1950 | 0 | — | 1 |
| Bolton Wanderers | 1 | 1958 | 0 | — | 1 |
| Derby County | 1 | 1975 | 0 | — | 1 |
| Crystal Palace | 1 | 2025 | 0 | — | 1 |
| Queens Park Rangers | 0 | — | 2 | 1912 | 2 |
| Ipswich Town | 0 | — | 2 | 1978 | 2 |
| Northampton Town | 0 | — | 1 | 1909 | 1 |
| Swindon Town | 0 | — | 1 | 1911 | 1 |
| Corinthian | 0 | — | 1 | 1927 | 1 |
| Preston North End | 0 | — | 1 | 1938 | 1 |
| English FA Canadian Touring XI | 0 | — | 1 | 1950 | 1 |
| Blackpool | 0 | — | 1 | 1953 | 1 |
| FA Select XI | 0 | — | 1 | 1961 | 1 |
| Southampton | 0 | — | 1 | 1976 | 1 |
| Coventry City | 0 | — | 1 | 1987 | 1 |
| Wimbledon | 0 | — | 1 | 1988 | 1 |
| Wigan Athletic | 0 | — | 1 | 2013 | 1 |
