= 2023 FA Community Shield =

Association football championship match

- The match programme cover
Arsenal	Manchester City
1	1
- Arsenal won 4–1 on penalties
- Date: 6 August 2023
- Venue: Wembley Stadium, London
- Man of the Match: Leandro Trossard (Arsenal)
- Referee: Stuart Attwell (Birmingham)
- Attendance: 81,145

The 2023 FA Community Shield was the 101st FA Community Shield, an annual football match played between the winners of the previous season's Premier League and FA Cup competitions. It took place at Wembley Stadium on 6 August 2023. As Manchester City won both the 2022–23 Premier League and the 2022–23 FA Cup, their opponents were the Premier League runners-up, Arsenal.

Arsenal won 4–1 on penalties after a 1–1 draw within 90 minutes. This was Arsenal's first competitive trophy since winning the 2020 FA Community Shield, making City only the second club to lose three Community Shield matches in a row and the first since cross-city rival Manchester United's four between 1998 and 2001. Arsenal also became the first team to win the Community Shield having not won either the league or FA Cup the previous season since United in 2010.

The match was initially planned to kick-off at 17:30 BST, however this was met with criticism from Manchester City fans who complained about its possible disruption to travelling to the match. Therefore, The Football Association moved kick-off to 16:00 instead on the same day. The match was televised live on ITV1 and ITVX.

Liverpool were the holders, having won the 2022 edition, but they did not qualify for this match as they finished fifth in the Premier League and were knocked out of the FA Cup in the fourth round.

== Background ==
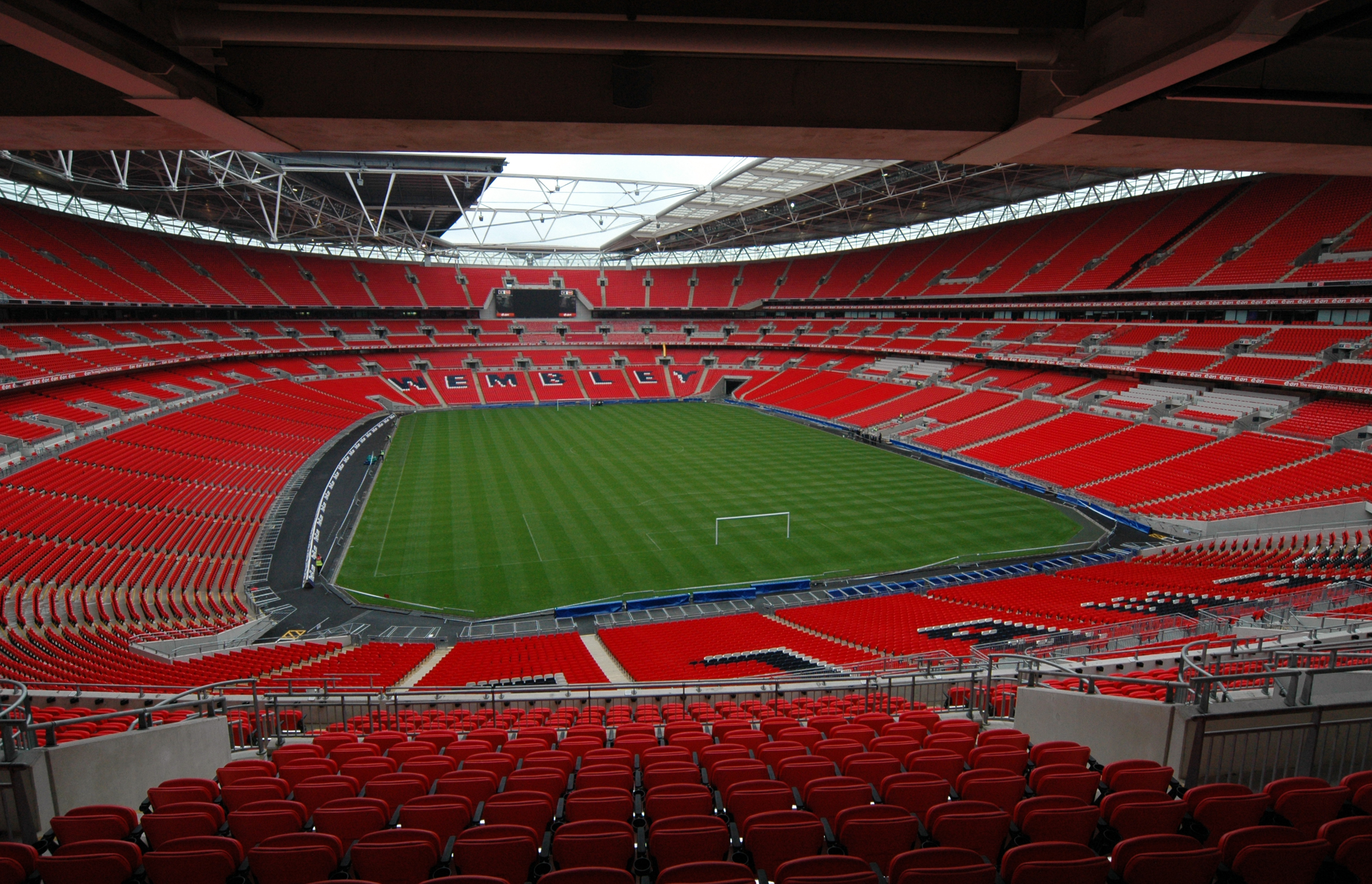
Wembley Stadium in London hosted the match

Manchester City qualified for the 2023 FA Community Shield as winners of the 2022–23 Premier League. The club later faced local rivals Manchester United in the 2023 FA Cup final, on course to complete a continental treble. Manchester City defeated Erik ten Hag's side to win their seventh FA Cup and as a result, Arsenal qualified for the 2023 FA Community Shield as Premier League runners-up. This was a rematch of the 1934 FA Charity Shield and 2014 FA Community Shield, which Arsenal won 4–0 and 3–0, respectively.

Arsenal were the home team of the match. The match returned to the home of English football in its 100th anniversary year after the 2022 edition was re-located to Leicester City's King Power Stadium due to the UEFA Women's Euro 2022 final.

== Match ==
=== Summary ===
In the 77th minute, Cole Palmer put Manchester City into the lead after he received the ball on the right-hand side and then cut inside before curling a left-footed shot from just inside the penalty area into the left-hand corner of the net past Aaron Ramsdale. Leandro Trossard equalised for Arsenal in the 11th minute of stoppage time, after he tried an effort from just inside the penalty area which took a heavy deflection off defender Manuel Akanji which wrong-footed goalkeeper Stefan Ortega and ended up in the back of the net to make it 1–1 late on and send the match to a penalty shoot-out. Kevin De Bruyne and Rodri both missed their penalties, which led to Fábio Vieira scoring the winning penalty in the top left corner for Arsenal to win their fifth Community Shield in ten years.

=== Details ===
6 August 2023
16:00 BST

Arsenal	1–1	Manchester City
Trossard 90+11'	Report	Palmer 77'
Penalties
Ødegaard (penalty scored); Trossard (penalty scored); Saka (penalty scored); Vieira (penalty scored)	4–1	(penalty missed) De Bruyne; (penalty scored) Silva; (penalty missed) Rodri

Wembley Stadium, London
Attendance: 81,145
Referee: Stuart Attwell (Birmingham)

Arsenal	Manchester City

GK	1	(England) Aaron Ramsdale
RB	4	(England) Ben White
CB	2	(France) William Saliba
CB	6	(Brazil) Gabriel Magalhães	(yellow card) 66'	(substituted off) 87'
LB	12	(Netherlands) Jurriën Timber		(substituted off) 76'
CM	41	(England) Declan Rice		(substituted off) 81'
CM	5	(Ghana) Thomas Partey	(yellow card) 8'
RW	7	(England) Bukayo Saka
AM	8	(Norway) Martin Ødegaard (c)
LW	11	(Brazil) Gabriel Martinelli		(substituted off) 75'
CF	29	(Germany) Kai Havertz	(yellow card) 27'	(substituted off) 87'
Substitutes:
GK	30	(United States) Matt Turner
DF	3	(Scotland) Kieran Tierney		(substituted on) 76'
DF	15	(Poland) Jakub Kiwior
DF	16	(England) Rob Holding
DF	18	(Japan) Takehiro Tomiyasu
MF	10	(England) Emile Smith Rowe		(substituted on) 87'
MF	21	(Portugal) Fábio Vieira		(substituted on) 87'
FW	14	(England) Eddie Nketiah		(substituted on) 81'
FW	19	(Belgium) Leandro Trossard		(substituted on) 75'
Manager:
(Spain) Mikel Arteta			(yellow card) 17'

GK	18	(Germany) Stefan Ortega
RB	2	(England) Kyle Walker (c)
CB	5	(England) John Stones
CB	3	(Portugal) Rúben Dias
LB	25	(Switzerland) Manuel Akanji
CM	16	(Spain) Rodri
CM	8	(Croatia) Mateo Kovačić		(substituted off) 64'
RW	20	(Portugal) Bernardo Silva
AM	19	(Argentina) Julián Alvarez	(yellow card) 31'
LW	10	(England) Jack Grealish		(substituted off) 58'
CF	9	(Norway) Erling Haaland		(substituted off) 64'
Substitutes:
GK	31	(Brazil) Ederson
DF	14	(Spain) Aymeric Laporte
DF	21	(Spain) Sergio Gómez
DF	82	(England) Rico Lewis
MF	4	(England) Kalvin Phillips
MF	17	(Belgium) Kevin De Bruyne		(substituted on) 64'
MF	47	(England) Phil Foden		(substituted on) 58'
MF	80	(England) Cole Palmer		(substituted on) 64'
MF	87	(England) James McAtee
Manager:
(Spain) Pep Guardiola

Man of the Match:
Leandro Trossard (Arsenal)

Assistant referees:
Tim Wood (Gloucestershire)
Dan Robathan (Norfolk)
Fourth official:
John Brooks (Leicestershire)
Reserve assistant referee:
Steve Meredith (Nottinghamshire)
Video assistant referee:
Michael Salisbury (Lancashire)
Assistant video assistant referee:
Neil Davies (London)

Match rules

- 90 minutes
- Penalty shoot-out if scores still level
- Nine named substitutes, of which six may be used
