= 2020 FA Cup final =

British association football match

Heads Up FA Cup final
- The match took place at Wembley Stadium.
- Event: 2019–20 FA Cup
Arsenal	Chelsea
2	1
- Date: 1 August 2020
- Venue: Wembley Stadium, London
- Man of the Match: Pierre-Emerick Aubameyang (Arsenal)
- Referee: Anthony Taylor (Cheshire)
- Attendance: 0 (Behind closed doors)

The 2020 FA Cup final, known officially as the Heads Up FA Cup final, was an association football match played behind closed doors between Arsenal and Chelsea at Wembley Stadium in London, England on 1 August 2020; it was originally scheduled for 23 May, but it was postponed due to the COVID-19 pandemic. It was the 139th FA Cup Final.

The match was officially named the "Heads Up FA Cup Final" by the FA as part of a campaign around mental health awareness promoted by the FA president, Prince William, Duke of Cambridge and was refereed by Anthony Taylor. Arsenal won the match 2–1 and received the trophy on the pitch, instead of by climbing steps to the Royal Box for the presentation, as in previous seasons. Pierre-Emerick Aubameyang was named man of the match. This was Arsenal's 14th record-extending FA Cup and latest trophy win overall. As winners, Arsenal entered the group stage of the UEFA Europa League and played Liverpool in the FA Community Shield, which they won through a penalty shoot-out.

The match was broadcast live in the United Kingdom by both BT Sport and the BBC, with the latter's coverage watched by 8.2 million viewers, making it the season's most-watched football match in the UK.

== Route to the final ==
=== Arsenal ===
Arsenal's route to the final
Round	Opposition	Score
3rd	Leeds United (H)	1–0
4th	Bournemouth (A)	2–1
5th	Portsmouth (A)	2–0
QF	Sheffield United (A)	2–1
SF	Manchester City (N)	2–0
Key: (H) = home venue; (A) = away venue; (N) = neutral venue

Arsenal, as a Premier League club, (Note: Premier League and Championship clubs entered the FA Cup competition in the third round.) started their 2019–20 FA Cup campaign in the third round at their home ground, the Emirates Stadium, against EFL Championship side Leeds United. After a goalless first half that Leeds dominated with 15 shots, including a Patrick Bamford strike that hit the crossbar, Arsenal took the lead in the 55th minute when Reiss Nelson scored from a deflected Alexandre Lacazette shot. Arsenal hit the Leeds crossbar from a Lacazette free kick and the match ended 1–0 to the home side. In the fourth round, Arsenal played Premier League side Bournemouth away at Dean Court. Arsenal took an early lead when Bukayo Saka struck the ball past Bournemouth goalkeeper Mark Travers in the fifth minute. Eddie Nketiah doubled the lead in the 21 minutes later and although Sam Surridge scored in second-half stoppage time for Bournemouth, Arsenal won 2–1. In the next round, Arsenal were drawn away to League One side Portsmouth who went into the game at Fratton Park on a ten-match winning streak. The first half remained goalless until four minutes into stoppage time when Sokratis scored with a volley from a cross from Nelson. Six minutes into the second half, Nketiah scored a close-range goal from Nelson's cross; the game ended 2–0 to Arsenal.

In the quarter-finals, Arsenal faced fellow Premier League side Sheffield United away at Bramall Lane. In the 25th minute, Lacazette was fouled by Chris Basham in Sheffield United's penalty area; Nicolas Pépé converted the subsequent penalty kick. David McGoldrick equalised three minutes before the end of regular time, striking the ball into Arsenal's net following a long throw-in. One minute into stoppage time, Dani Ceballos gathered a loose ball in Sheffield United's box and struck a low shot beneath Dean Henderson to give Arsenal a 2–1 victory. In their semi-final, played at Wembley Stadium in London (a neutral venue), Arsenal played Premier League side Manchester City, the FA Cup holders. Pierre-Emerick Aubameyang put Arsenal ahead in the 19th minute when he scored from Pépé's cross with the outside of his foot. He then scored another in the 71st minute to secure a 2–0 victory and progression to the FA Cup final.

=== Chelsea ===
Chelsea's route to the final
Round	Opposition	Score
3rd	Nottingham Forest (H)	2–0
4th	Hull City (A)	2–1
5th	Liverpool (H)	2–0
QF	Leicester City (A)	1–0
SF	Manchester United (N)	3–1
Key: (H) = home venue; (A) = away venue; (N) = neutral venue

Chelsea started their FA Cup run in the third round with a home game at Stamford Bridge against Championship side Nottingham Forest. Callum Hudson-Odoi scored after six minutes to give Chelsea the lead. Ross Barkley then struck from close range in the 33rd minute after another Hudson-Odoi shot was saved. The second half was goalless and Chelsea won the match 2–0. In the fourth round, they were drawn against another Championship side, Hull City, this time away at the KCOM Stadium. Michy Batshuayi put the visitors ahead with a shot which deflected off Ryan Tafazolli past Hull City goalkeeper George Long. Fikayo Tomori scored with a header from a Barkley free kick, making it 2–0. With 12 minutes remaining, Kamil Grosicki scored for Hull City with a deflected free kick but Chelsea progressed with a 2–1 win. Chelsea faced fifth-round opponents Liverpool, a Premier League club, at home. Willian put the home side ahead after 13 minutes, when Liverpool goalkeeper Adrián failed to gather his initial 20 yards (18 m) shot. Midway through the second half, Barkley scored following a solo run, giving Chelsea a 2–0 win.

In the quarter-finals, Chelsea were drawn away against Premier League side Leicester City at the King Power Stadium. After a goalless first half dominated by the home team, second-half substitute Barkley scored from Willian's cross to secure a 1–0 Chelsea victory. Chelsea's semi-final with Premier League side Manchester United took place at Wembley Stadium; the sides were meeting in the FA Cup for the fourth consecutive season. Olivier Giroud gave Chelsea the lead 11 minutes into first-half stoppage time after a mistake from Manchester United goalkeeper David de Gea. A minute after half time, Mason Mount made it 2–0 when De Gea fumbled Mount's shot from 20 yards (18 m). Harry Maguire scored an own goal in the 74th minute when he deflected a cross from Marcos Alonso. With five minutes remaining, Manchester United's Anthony Martial was fouled by Hudson-Odoi in Chelsea's penalty area; Bruno Fernandes scored the penalty. Chelsea won 3–1 and progressed to the final.

== Match ==
=== Background ===
The two finalists share a London derby rivalry, with the sides having faced each other more than 200 times since their inaugural match in November 1907. The final, the 21st FA Cup match between the sides, was a repeat of the 2002 and 2017 FA Cup finals, both of which Arsenal had won. It was also a repeat of the previous year's UEFA Europa League final, which Chelsea won. While playing for the clubs they now managed, Mikel Arteta of Arsenal had won two FA Cups; Frank Lampard, Chelsea's manager, had won four. The 2020 FA Cup Final was the 139th final of the competition overall.

This was Chelsea's 15th FA Cup final, their last appearance being in 2018 where the secured a 1–0 win over Manchester United, and Arsenal's 21st, their most recent being a 2–1 victory over Chelsea in 2017. Before the 2020 final, Arsenal's held the record for most FA Cup wins with 13. In the two matches between the clubs during the 2019–20 Premier League, Chelsea won 2–1 at the Emirates Stadium in December 2019 while the game at Stamford Bridge the following month ended in a 2–2 draw. The Premier League season ended with Chelsea in fourth position and Arsenal eighth, ten points behind. Arsenal's final league position meant that winning the FA Cup was the club's only means of qualifying for European football the following season. Both sides had lost in the EFL Cup's fourth round; Arsenal lost away to Liverpool in a penalty shoot-out after their match at Anfield ended 5–5, while Chelsea lost 2–1 at home to Manchester United.

Originally scheduled for 23 May, the final was delayed due to the COVID-19 pandemic in the United Kingdom and was played on 1 August 2020 behind closed doors at Wembley Stadium. The referee was Anthony Taylor, representing the Cheshire Football Association. Having refereed 2017's final, he became the first person since Arthur Kingscott in 1901 to referee two finals. Ordinarily referees would only officiate one FA Cup final, but with the 2020 final taking place without supporters in the stadium, the FA appointed Taylor for a second time. David Elleray, the FA Referees' Committee chairman, said "a significant part of the Cup Final appointment is the opportunity to share this – the English refereeing pinnacle – with partners, family, friends and those who have been an important part of their long journey to the Final ... Sadly, this year's Final will be very different and will be held without all these elements in an empty stadium. With this in mind, the Committee decided it would be unfair to appoint someone who has not yet done the Final and have, instead, appointed Anthony Taylor to his second FA Cup Final." Taylor was assisted by Gary Beswick and Adam Nunn. Chris Kavanagh was the fourth official and Lee Betts was the reserve assistant referee. Stuart Attwell was the video assistant referee (VAR).

Chelsea's starting lineup was unchanged from their previous match, a league game against Wolverhampton Wanderers. Arsenal made one change to the side which started at their previous game, against Watford in the Premier League, Héctor Bellerín replacing Joe Willock. Both sides adopted a 3–4–3 formation and Aubameyang captained Arsenal while César Azpilicueta was Chelsea's captain.

The 2020 FA Cup Final was officially named the "Heads Up FA Cup Final" by the Football Association as part of a campaign around mental health awareness promoted by The FA president, Prince William, Duke of Cambridge. Before the match, a recording of Emeli Sandé singing the traditional hymn "Abide with Me" was broadcast from Wembley's roof, and within the stadium the British Youth Opera, accompanied by the Massed Bands of the Household Division, performed the English national anthem "God Save the Queen".

=== Summary ===
==== First half ====
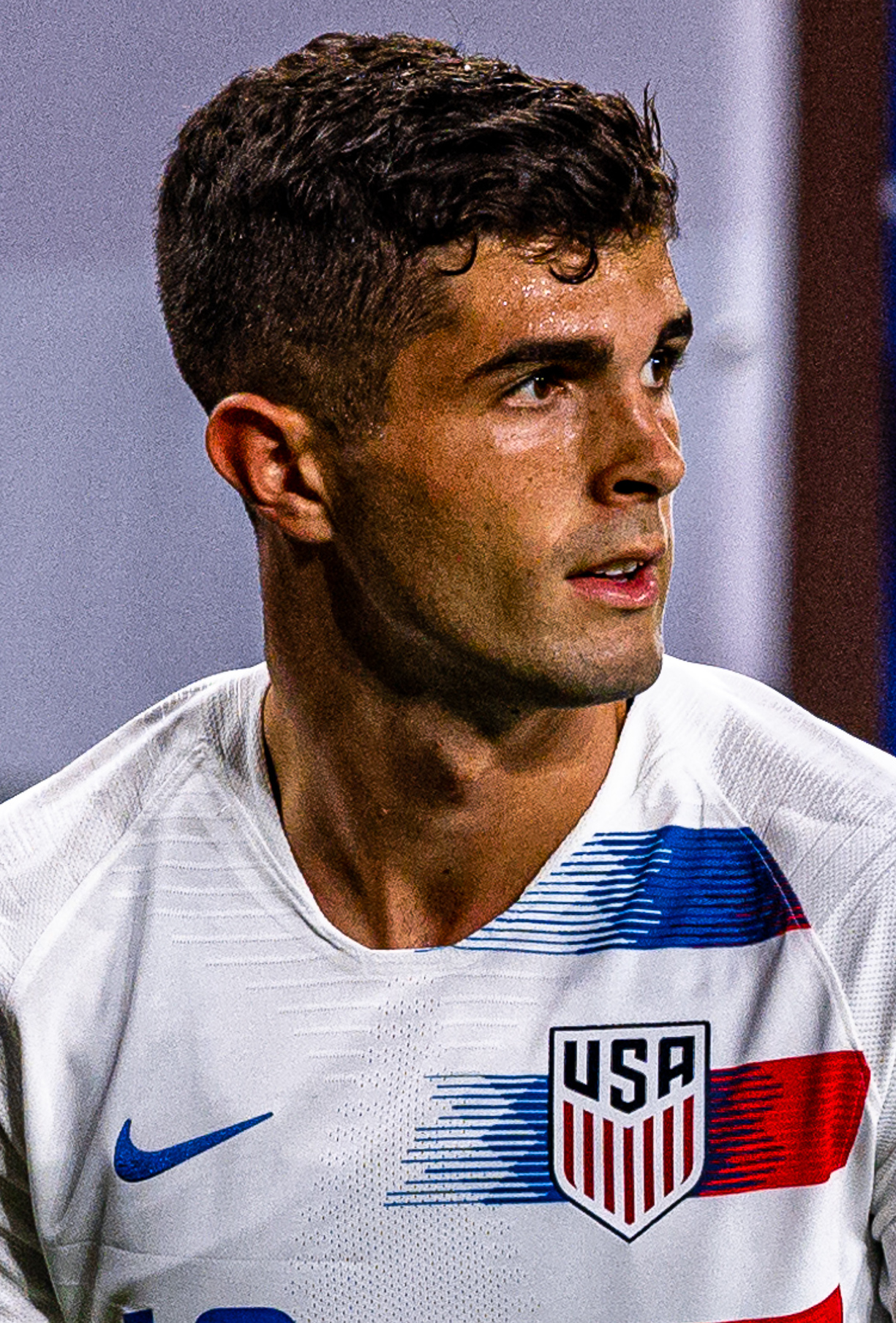
Christian Pulisic (pictured in 2019) scored the opening goal of the final for Chelsea.

The match kicked off at 5:30 p.m. and the first chance to score fell to Arsenal: in the third minute, Ainsley Maitland-Niles played in a cross which Aubameyang headed wide. A minute later, Mount struck a shot from around 20 yards (18 m) which Emiliano Martínez, the Arsenal goalkeeper, dived to push away. In the fifth minute, Chelsea took the lead through Christian Pulisic. From a midfield position, he passed the ball to Mount, who took it into Arsenal's penalty area. Mount passed to Giroud; he passed back to Pulisic who scored from close range, becoming the first player from the United States to score in an FA Cup final. Three minutes later, Pépé had a shot from distance saved by Chelsea goalkeeper Willy Caballero. Pulisic then evaded Rob Holding before striking a shot which was saved by Martínez. Mateo Kovačić became the game's first player to be shown a yellow card when, in the 13th minute, he fouled Granit Xhaka. Ceballos then struck a free kick too high before the match was paused for a drinks interval.

Two minutes after the restart, Pépé's strike from around 20 yards (18 m) flew into the top corner of Chelsea's net but the goal was disallowed as Aubameyang was offside during the build-up. In the 28th minute, Azpilicueta brought Aubameyang down as he ran in on Chelsea's goal. The Chelsea player was booked and Arsenal were awarded a penalty, which Aubameyang took, beating Caballero who dived in the wrong direction, making the score 1–1. Azpilicueta then went down with a leg injury and was replaced by Andreas Christensen in the game's first substitution. With eight minutes remaining in the first half, Mount crossed the ball from the left to Jorginho but his shot was well over Arsenal's crossbar as Alonso inadvertently got in his way. Following Christensen tripping Pépé in the 44th minute, Arsenal's players appealed for a penalty, but it was deemed to have occurred outside the penalty area. Lacazette struck the resulting free kick wide of Chelsea's goal. The half ended 1–1.

==== Second half ====
Neither side made any substitutions during the interval. Straight from the kick-off, Pulisic dribbled past Arsenal's defence but his shot went wide. It was his final contribution as he suffered a hamstring injury and was replaced by Pedro. Chelsea dominated the second half's early stages and in the 62nd minute Pedro passed to Reece James, but James's shot was off-target. Three minutes later, Mount went clear down the left wing and crossed but none of his teammates were in a position to convert the opportunity. Midway through the second half, Arsenal took the lead. Bellerin ran through the middle with the ball but was tackled by Christensen. Pépé collected the loose ball and passed to Aubameyang on the left side of Chelsea's penalty area. Aubameyang ran past Chelsea defender Kurt Zouma before lifting the ball over Caballero to make it 2–1 in the 67th minute. The second-half drinks break was then taken.

In the 73rd minute, Chelsea were reduced to 10 men when Kovačić was sent off after fouling Xhaka and being shown a second yellow card. With 12 minutes remaining, Chelsea made a triple-substitution: Barkley, Hudson-Odoi and Tammy Abraham came on for Mount, Antonio Rüdiger and Giroud. Two minutes later, Arsenal sent on Nketiah to replace Lacazette, before David Luiz withdrew with a leg injury and Sokratis replaced him. With a minute of regular time remaining, Barkley was booked and the match went into seven minutes of stoppage time. A corner from Pedro was gathered by Martinez before Pedro was attended to by medical staff for an injured shoulder. After several minutes of attention, he left the pitch on a stretcher. After 14 minutes of stoppage time, the game was brought to an end. Arsenal won 2–1, claiming a record 14th FA Cup.

=== Details ===
1 August 2020
17:30 BST

Arsenal	2–1	Chelsea
Aubameyang 28' (pen.), 67'	Report	Pulisic 5'

Wembley Stadium, London
Attendance: 0 (Note: The final was played behind closed doors due to the COVID-19 pandemic in the United Kingdom.)
Referee: Anthony Taylor (Cheshire)

Arsenal	Chelsea

GK	26	(Argentina) Emiliano Martínez
CB	16	(England) Rob Holding
CB	23	(Brazil) David Luiz		(substituted off) 88'
CB	3	(Scotland) Kieran Tierney		(substituted off) 90+13'
WB	2	(Spain) Héctor Bellerín
CM	8	(Spain) Dani Ceballos	(yellow card) 73'
CM	34	(Switzerland) Granit Xhaka
WB	15	(England) Ainsley Maitland-Niles
RW	19	(Ivory Coast) Nicolas Pépé
CF	9	(France) Alexandre Lacazette		(substituted off) 82'
LW	14	(Gabon) Pierre-Emerick Aubameyang (c)
Substitutes:
GK	33	(England) Matt Macey
DF	5	(Greece) Sokratis Papastathopoulos		(substituted on) 88'
DF	31	(Bosnia and Herzegovina) Sead Kolašinac		(substituted on) 90+13'
MF	11	(Uruguay) Lucas Torreira
MF	28	(England) Joe Willock
MF	57	(England) Matt Smith
MF	77	(England) Bukayo Saka
FW	24	(England) Reiss Nelson
FW	30	(England) Eddie Nketiah		(substituted on) 82'
Manager:
(Spain) Mikel Arteta

GK	13	(Argentina) Willy Caballero
CB	28	(Spain) César Azpilicueta (c)	(yellow card) 26'	(substituted off) 35'
CB	15	(France) Kurt Zouma
CB	2	(Germany) Antonio Rüdiger	(yellow card) 75'	(substituted off) 78'
WB	24	(England) Reece James
CM	5	(Italy) Jorginho
CM	17	(Croatia) Mateo Kovačić	(yellow card) 14' (yellow-red card) 73'
WB	3	(Spain) Marcos Alonso
RW	19	(England) Mason Mount	(yellow card) 45+4'	(substituted off) 78'
CF	18	(France) Olivier Giroud		(substituted off) 78'
LW	22	(United States) Christian Pulisic		(substituted off) 49'
Substitutes:
GK	1	(Spain) Kepa Arrizabalaga
DF	4	(Denmark) Andreas Christensen		(substituted on) 35'
DF	29	(England) Fikayo Tomori
DF	33	(Italy) Emerson
MF	7	(France) N'Golo Kanté
MF	8	(England) Ross Barkley	(yellow card) 89'	(substituted on) 78'
MF	20	(England) Callum Hudson-Odoi		(substituted on) 78'
FW	9	(England) Tammy Abraham		(substituted on) 78'
FW	11	(Spain) Pedro		(substituted on) 49'
Head coach:
(England) Frank Lampard

Man of the Match:
Pierre-Emerick Aubameyang (Arsenal)

Assistant referees:
Gary Beswick (Durham)
Adam Nunn (Wiltshire)
Fourth official:
Chris Kavanagh (Manchester)
Reserve assistant referee:
Lee Betts (Norfolk)
Video assistant referee:
Stuart Attwell (Birmingham)
Assistant video assistant referee:
Stephen Child (London)

Match rules

- 90 minutes
- 30 minutes of extra time if necessary
- Penalty shoot-out if scores still level
- Nine named substitutes
- Maximum of five substitutions, with a sixth allowed in extra time (Note: Each team was given only three opportunities to make substitutions, with a fourth opportunity in extra time, excluding substitutions made at half-time, before the start of extra time and at half-time in extra time.)

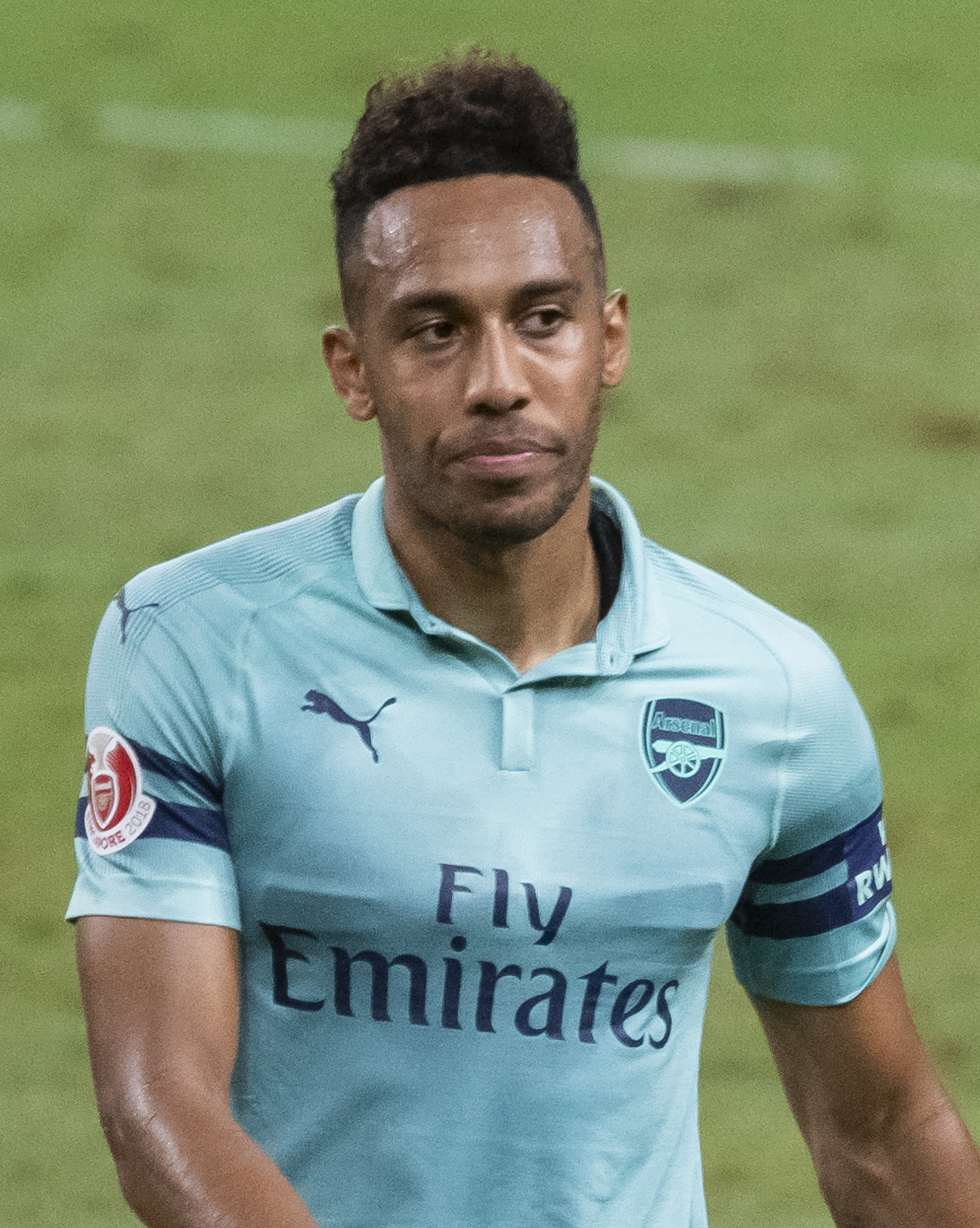
Pierre-Emerick Aubameyang (pictured in 2018) scored both of Arsenal's goals.

Statistics
	Arsenal	Chelsea
Total shots	14	12
Shots on target	3	3
Corner kicks	6	4
Fouls committed	2	14
Possession	40%	60%
Yellow cards	1	5
Red cards	0	1

== Post-match ==
As part of precautions against COVID-19, Arsenal received the trophy on the pitch and not, as in previous seasons, by climbing steps to the Royal Box for the presentation. Whilst carrying the trophy to his team before its formal lifting, Aubameyang dropped the cup and the base. Aubameyang was named man of the match. The game was broadcast live in the United Kingdom on BT Sport and BBC, with BBC's coverage watched by 8.2 million viewers, making it the season's most watched football match in the UK.

Arteta noted his side had made a slow start but their subsequent performance was impressive: "It was a difficult start when we conceded so early ... We played probably the best 30 minutes after since I arrived. I am so proud to represent these players and this club." His counterpart Lampard agreed Chelsea had started strongly but then "got complacent, we took time on the ball like it was a stroll and we allowed them into the game."

Former England and Newcastle United striker Alan Shearer suggested Arsenal were worthy winners and "showed great character after going behind", though noted that "Pulisic going off injured helped them." Ashley Cole, who had played for both Arsenal and Chelsea, agreed, saying "Arsenal did deserve it. Mikel Arteta has done a great job." Ex-Arsenal forward Ian Wright suggested Chelsea had been unlucky: "Chelsea were unfortunate with those injuries and they had some decisions which were very unfair on them."

As winners, Arsenal entered the UEFA Europa League group stage and also qualified to play Liverpool in the FA Community Shield at the end of the month, winning the latter 5–4 on penalties after a 1–1 draw in 120 minutes of regulation-extended time.
