= Emile Smith Rowe =

English footballer (born 2000)

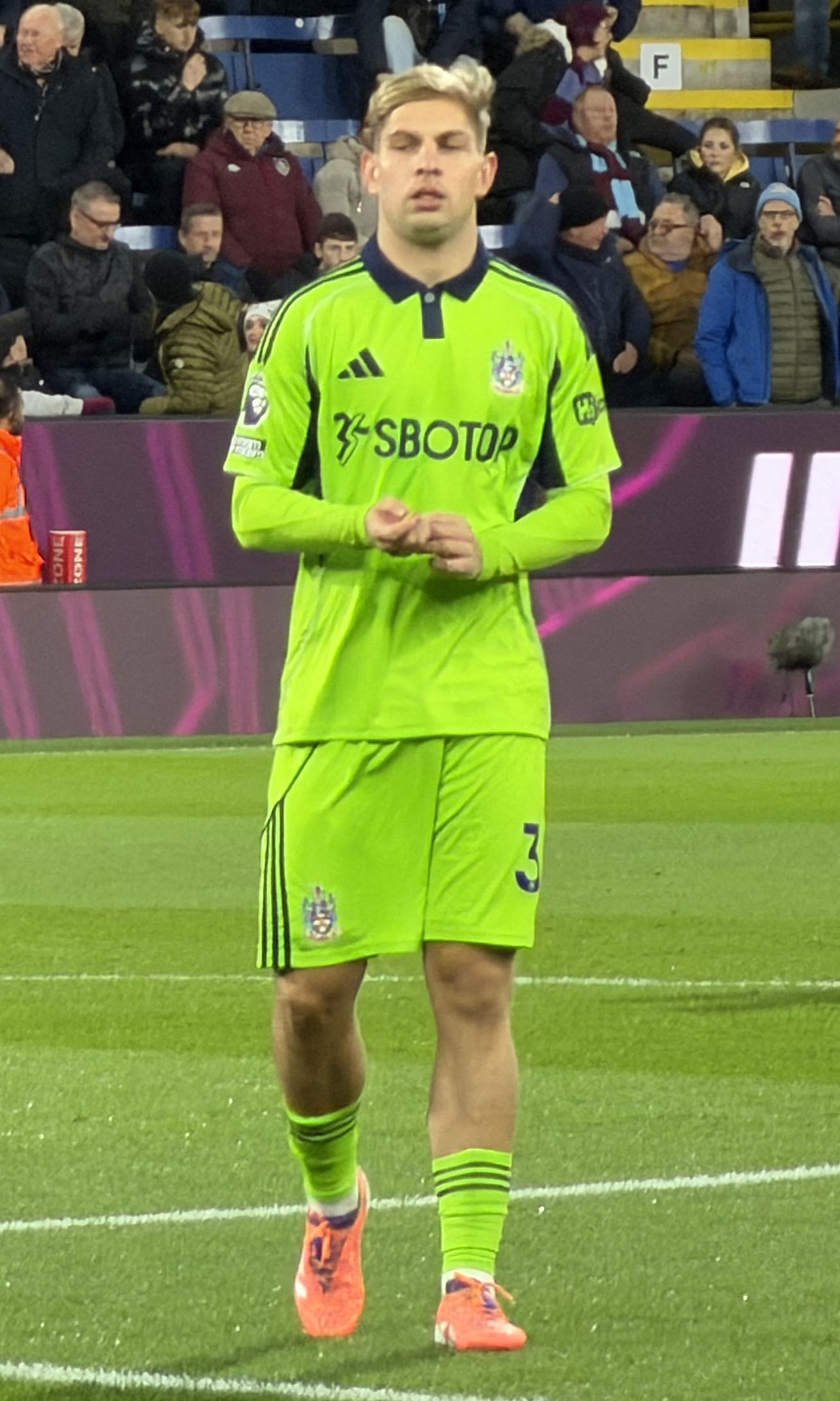
- Smith Rowe with Fulham in 2025

Personal information
- Full name: Emile Smith Rowe
- Date of birth: 28 July 2000 (age 26)
- Place of birth: Thornton Heath, England
- Height: 6 ft 0 in (1.82 m)
- Position: Attacking midfielder

Team information
- Current team: Fulham
- Number: 32

Youth career
- –2010: Glebe
- 2010–2018: Arsenal

Senior career*
| Years | Team | Apps | (Gls) |
| 2018–2024 | Arsenal | 80 | (12) |
| 2019 | → RB Leipzig (loan) | 3 | (0) |
| 2020 | → Huddersfield Town (loan) | 19 | (2) |
| 2024– | Fulham | 75 | (9) |

International career
| 2015 | England U16 | 3 | (1) |
| 2016 | England U17 | 11 | (2) |
| 2017 | England U18 | 2 | (0) |
| 2018 | England U19 | 4 | (1) |
| 2019 | England U20 | 1 | (0) |
| 2021−2023 | England U21 | 16 | (5) |
| 2021–2022 | England | 3 | (1) |
Medal record
Men's football
Representing England
UEFA European Under-21 Championship
| Winner | 2023 Georgia–Romania |
FIFA U-17 World Cup
| Winner | 2017 India |
UEFA European Under-17 Championship
| Runner-up | 2017 Croatia |
- * Club domestic league appearances and goals as of 17:01, 10 October 2026 (UTC)

Emile Smith Rowe (born 28 July 2000) is an English professional footballer who plays as an attacking midfielder for Premier League club Fulham and the England national team..

He was a highly regarded youth player at Arsenal, whilst also playing a key part for England in their successful FIFA U-17 World Cup campaign in 2017. Smith Rowe's professional breakthrough came in 2018, as he made an immediate impression at senior level for Arsenal, scoring several times in his first games.

In January, Smith Rowe moved to Bundesliga's RB Leipzig on loan, playing just 3 times due to a recurring groin injury, despite this, the German club lobbied unsuccessfully for a permanent move. In July 2019, Smith Rowe returned to rehab at Arsenal for the first half of the season. In January 2020, Smith Rowe moved to Huddersfield Town on loan, playing a key part in keeping them up in the Championship.

Upon returning from loan, Smith Rowe established himself as a key player for Arsenal under Mikel Arteta. In July 2021, he was given the number 10 shirt vacated by Mesut Özil, and signed a long-term contract. That following season, Smith Rowe scored ten goals in the league, and was shortlisted for the Premier League Young Player of the Season and the PFA Young Player of the Year awards.

Smith Rowe has represented every age bracket for England at youth levels. He made his senior debut against Albania on 12 November 2021, in a 5–0 FIFA World Cup qualification victory.

== Club career ==
=== Arsenal ===
==== Early years ====
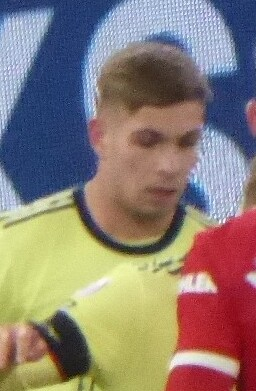
Smith Rowe with Arsenal in 2021.

Smith Rowe joined Arsenal's Hale End Academy in 2010 at the age of ten, after playing for South London-based team Glebe. He made his first appearance for the Under-23s in 2016–17, at the age of 16. He continued in the Under-23s during the 2017–18 season, making 10 appearances for the side, recorded 2 assists and 1 goal. He signed his first professional contract with the club on 31 July 2017.

Smith Rowe signed a new long-term professional contract with Arsenal on 31 July 2018, when he was described by head coach Unai Emery as having "lots of potential". The length of the contract was not disclosed by Arsenal, but it was reported to be five years.

Smith Rowe made his Arsenal first-team competitive debut on 20 September 2018 against Vorskla Poltava in the UEFA Europa League, coming on as a second-half substitute for Alex Iwobi. His appearance was the first Arsenal professional debut by a player born in the 2000s. He scored after starting the following Europa League match against Qarabağ in a 3–0 victory for Arsenal, becoming the youngest Arsenal goalscorer in a competitive match since Alex Oxlade-Chamberlain in 2011, and the first player born after 2000 to score for the London club. He scored his first goal at the Emirates in a 2–1 victory over Blackpool in the EFL Cup.

==== 2018–2020: Loans to RB Leipzig and Huddersfield Town ====
On 31 January 2019, he joined RB Leipzig on loan until the end of the 2018–19 season. After signing, Leipzig discovered that Smith Rowe was not fully recovered from a groin injury. Leipzig manager Ralf Rangnick said: "He will not be fully training with us in the next two to three weeks". Due to his injury issue, he only played a total of 28 minutes in three substitute appearances during his time at Leipzig.

On 10 January 2020, Smith Rowe joined EFL Championship club Huddersfield Town on loan until the end of the 2019–20 season. Huddersfield manager Danny Cowley responded to supporters' wishes for Smith Rowe to play more minutes by stating: "We have to be very protective of him which none of us like. I actually boo myself when I take him off, because it's not something I want to do." On 1 February, Smith Rowe scored his first goal for Huddersfield in a 3–2 league defeat to Fulham. Smith Rowe's performance at Huddersfield caught the eye of many. In particular, in his final home appearance for the club, he scored the winning goal in the 86th minute against West Brom that would eventually help Huddersfield to secure EFL Championship safety.

==== 2020–2022: First-team breakthrough ====
On 29 August 2020, Smith Rowe was named an unused substitute in the 2020 FA Community Shield, in which Arsenal defeated Premier League winners Liverpool 5–4 on penalties after the match finished 1–1 in 90 minutes. Following his return to Arsenal, Smith Rowe struggled with injuries before returning to fitness in the autumn. Although he performed well in Arsenal's Europa League group fixtures, scoring or assisting in each of his matches, he did not start any of Arsenal's league matches in October or November. Following Arsenal's worst league start in decades, manager Mikel Arteta entrusted Smith Rowe with the number 10 role, replacing Willian on 26 December against London rivals Chelsea, to inspire a 3–1 home win to end the club's poor run of form. In his next five matches, Smith Rowe recorded three assists and scored a goal in a 2–0 FA Cup victory over Newcastle United. On 14 March 2021, Smith Rowe played in the North London derby for the first time and delivered a man of the match performance in a 2–1 win over Tottenham Hotspur. On 9 May, Smith Rowe scored his first Premier League goal in a 3–1 home win over West Bromwich Albion. On 12 May, Smith Rowe scored the only goal in an away win over Chelsea, sealing the Gunners' first win at Stamford Bridge in nearly 10 years and Arsenal's first league double over the Blues since 2004.

On 22 July 2021, Smith Rowe ended months of speculation by signing a long-term deal with the club, reported to be a five-year contract. He was also handed the number 10 shirt for the new season, previously vacated by Mesut Özil. The fans wholeheartedly embraced him, often chanting his and Bukayo Saka's names to the tune of 'Rocking All Over the World' by Status Quo. On 26 September, Smith Rowe scored a goal and recorded an assist in a 3–1 win over rivals Tottenham. In November, Smith Rowe scored three goals in three consecutive league matches, scoring in Arsenal's 3–1 win over Aston Villa on 22 October, their 2–0 victory over Leicester City on 30 October, and the only goal in a 1–0 win over Watford on 7 November.

On 5 December 2021, Smith Rowe would score his 5th league goal of the season in a 3–2 away defeat against Manchester United, later coming off injured with a tight groin which sidelined him for several matches. He would later make his return from injury with a substitute appearance against West Ham on 15 December, scoring in a 2–0 win at the Emirates. Smith Rowe would again go on to score as a substitute in the following league games against Leeds United and Norwich City.

On 19 February 2022, Smith Rowe scored the opening goal against Brentford in a 2–1 home win. The goal, his tenth of the 2021–22 season, made him the first Hale End graduate since Cesc Fàbregas in 2009–10 to hit double figures in a season.

==== 2022–2024: Limited opportunities ====
At the start of the 2022–23 season, Smith Rowe struggled with a groin injury. He had surgery to fix the problem and was unable to play for the first half of the season. He recovered, and was included in the squad in the latter half of the season.

On 4 March 2023, he came on in the first half against Bournemouth for the injured Leandro Trossard and provided an assist for Thomas Partey. Smith Rowe would himself be replaced by Reiss Nelson, who scored the winning goal in the 97th minute as Arsenal recovered from going 2–0 down to win 3–2. Smith Rowe struggled with injury throughout the 2022-23 season, making just 12 league appearances as the Gunners finished Premier League runners-up to Manchester City.

On 6 August 2023, Smith Rowe made his first appearance of the 2023–24 season, coming on as a late substitute during Arsenal's victory over Manchester City in the 2023 FA Community Shield. Later that month, Smith Rowe was subject to a transfer enquiry from London rivals Chelsea. However, Arsenal insisted that Smith Rowe was not for sale, with club manager Mikel Arteta confirming in a press conference that Arsenal had no intention of selling Smith Rowe, despite his limited playing opportunities.

Smith Rowe made his 100th first-team appearance for Arsenal on 27 September 2023 in their 1–0 win at Brentford in the EFL Cup. It was his first start for the club since May 2022. On 28 October 2023, Smith Rowe made his first Premier League start of the season in Arsenal's 5–0 home win over Sheffield United, assisting teammate Eddie Nketiah in the 58th minute, helping him complete a hat-trick. His next start for Arsenal came in a 2–0 win against Luton Town on 3 April 2024, where he was named man of the match after being integral in the creation of both Arsenal's goals.

=== Fulham ===
Smith Rowe joined Fulham on a five-year contract on 2 August 2024 for a club-record reported fee of £27 million with £7 million in potential add-ons. He made his Fulham debut in a 1–0 loss against Manchester United in the league. His home debut on 24 August 2024 saw his first goal in over two years in a 2–1 win against Leicester City.

== International career ==
Smith Rowe has been capped by England at U16, U17, U18 and U19 level whilst progressing through the ranks at Arsenal's academy. In April 2017, Smith Rowe was included in the squad for the 2017 UEFA European Under-17 Championship. He came off the bench in the semi-final match against Turkey but did not play in the final as England were defeated on penalties by Spain. In October, he was part of the squad that won the U-17 World Cup. He scored in the group stage against Iraq and provided an assist for Rhian Brewster to score against Brazil in the semi-finals.

In October 2018, Smith Rowe scored for the England under-19 team against Portugal. On 14 November 2019, Smith Rowe made a goalscoring debut for the England under-20 team during a 4–0 win away to Portugal in the Under 20 Elite League. On 15 March 2021, Smith Rowe received his first England U21 call up as part of the Young Lions squad for the 2021 UEFA European Under-21 Championship. He made his debut in the opening game of the tournament, a 1–0 loss to Switzerland on 25 March.

Smith Rowe received his first call up to the England senior team in November 2021 for the 2022 FIFA World Cup qualification matches against Albania and San Marino. He made his debut as a 77th-minute substitute for Raheem Sterling in the 5–0 victory over Albania. Smith Rowe scored his first international goal in the 58th minute of England's 10–0 away win against San Marino on 15 November 2021.

On 14 June 2023, Smith Rowe was included in the England U21 squad for the 2023 UEFA European Under-21 Championship. England emerged as champions with their 1–0 victory over Spain U21s in the final where he was named as a starter.

== Style of play ==
Arsenal's former head of academy recruitment, Steve Morrow, described Smith Rowe to be "very direct, always looked forward, had a lovely touch, very clever in possession. He is always full of energy and work rate, and come alive on the ball." In his weekly Team of the Week column, Garth Crooks said "this boy is a Rolls Royce of a midfielder. I'm surprised he doesn't work in the fashion industry as this boy can thread the ball through the eye of a needle". Mark Hudson, the former first-team coach at Huddersfield Town, was also impressed by Smith Rowe, "He drifts past people. He does not look quick but he is and it is with the ball which is brilliant. He naturally glides across the ground and he takes the ball in his stride. He has good vision and a good understanding of the game."

== Personal life ==
Smith Rowe was born in Croydon, England, to parents Leslie Rowe and Fiona Smith. His father, Leslie, worked in foster care service for Islington Council, whilst his mother worked in social care. Smith Rowe has expressed the influence his father has had on him as a role-model, and that he played a key role in teaching him about kindness and giving back. He said in an interview, "I think it's very important that I give back and try to emulate what he [Emile's father] has done".

He is of Jamaican descent through his father, and Malaysian descent through his maternal grandmother, who is from Rembau, Negeri Sembilan.

== Career statistics ==
=== Club ===
As of match played 10 October 2026

Appearances and goals by club, season and competition
| Club | Season | League | | | National cup (Note: Includes FA Cup) | | League cup (Note: Includes EFL Cup) | | Europe | | Other | | Total | |
| Club | Season | Division | Apps | Goals | Apps | Goals | Apps | Goals | Apps | Goals | Apps | Goals | Apps | Goals |
|---|---|---|---|---|---|---|---|---|---|---|---|---|---|---|
| Arsenal U21 | 2018–19 | — | | | — | | — | | — | | 1 (Note: Appearance(s) in EFL Trophy) | 1 | 1 | 1 |
| Arsenal U21 | 2019–20 | — | | | — | | — | | — | | 2 | 0 | 2 | 0 |
| Arsenal U21 | 2020–21 | — | | | — | | — | | — | | 1 | 0 | 1 | 0 |
| Arsenal U21 | Total | | — | | — | | — | | — | | 4 | 1 | 4 | 1 |
| Arsenal | 2018–19 | Premier League | 0 | 0 | 0 | 0 | 2 | 1 | 4 (Note: Appearance(s) in UEFA Europa League) | 2 | — | | 6 | 3 |
| Arsenal | 2019–20 | Premier League | 2 | 0 | 0 | 0 | 1 | 0 | 3 | 0 | — | | 6 | 0 |
| Arsenal | 2020–21 | Premier League | 20 | 2 | 1 | 1 | 1 | 0 | 11 | 1 | 0 | 0 | 33 | 4 |
| Arsenal | 2021–22 | Premier League | 33 | 10 | 0 | 0 | 4 | 1 | — | | — | | 37 | 11 |
| Arsenal | 2022–23 | Premier League | 12 | 0 | 1 | 0 | 0 | 0 | 1 | 0 | — | | 14 | 0 |
| Arsenal | 2023–24 | Premier League | 13 | 0 | 1 | 0 | 1 | 0 | 3 (Note: Appearances in UEFA Champions League) | 0 | 1 (Note: Appearance in Community Shield) | 0 | 19 | 0 |
| Arsenal | Total | | 80 | 12 | 3 | 1 | 9 | 2 | 22 | 3 | 1 | 0 | 115 | 18 |
| RB Leipzig (loan) | 2018–19 | Bundesliga | 3 | 0 | 0 | 0 | — | | — | | — | | 3 | 0 |
| Huddersfield Town (loan) | 2019–20 | Championship | 19 | 2 | — | | — | | — | | — | | 19 | 2 |
| Fulham | 2024–25 | Premier League | 34 | 6 | 4 | 0 | 2 | 0 | — | | — | | 40 | 6 |
| Fulham | 2025–26 | Premier League | 37 | 3 | 3 | 1 | 3 | 1 | — | | — | | 43 | 5 |
| Fulham | 2026–27 | Premier League | 4 | 0 | 0 | 0 | 1 | 1 | — | | — | | 5 | 1 |
| Fulham | Total | | 75 | 9 | 7 | 1 | 6 | 2 | — | | — | | 88 | 12 |
| Career total | | | 177 | 23 | 9 | 1 | 15 | 4 | 22 | 3 | 5 | 1 | 228 | 32 |

=== International ===
As of match played 29 March 2022

Appearances and goals by national team and year
| National team | Year | Apps | Goals |
|---|---|---|---|
| England | 2021 | 2 | 1 |
| England | 2022 | 1 | 0 |
| Total | | 3 | 1 |

As of match played 29 March 2022
England score listed first, score column indicates score after each Smith Rowe goal

List of international goals scored by Emile Smith Rowe
| No. | Date | Venue | Cap | Opponent | Score | Result | Competition | Ref. |
|---|---|---|---|---|---|---|---|---|
| 1 | 15 November 2021 | San Marino Stadium, Serravalle, San Marino | 2 | San Marino | 7–0 | 10–0 | 2022 FIFA World Cup qualification | |

== Honours ==
Arsenal

- FA Community Shield: 2020, 2023

England U17

- FIFA U-17 World Cup: 2017

England U21

- UEFA European Under-21 Championship: 2023
