= 2022 FA Community Shield =

Association football championship match

- The match programme cover
Liverpool	Manchester City
3	1
- Date: 30 July 2022
- Venue: King Power Stadium, Leicester
- Man of the Match: Darwin Núñez (Liverpool)
- Referee: Craig Pawson (Sheffield & Hallamshire)
- Attendance: 28,545

The 2022 FA Community Shield was the 100th FA Community Shield, an annual football match played between the winners of the previous season's Premier League and the winners of the previous season's FA Cup. It was played on 30 July 2022, with Liverpool defeating Manchester City 3–1 for their 16th FA Community Shield title and the club's first in 16 years.

Due to the hosting of the UEFA Women's Euro 2022 final, the match took place away from the usual Wembley Stadium for the first time in 10 years, and was instead played at Shield holders Leicester City's King Power Stadium. With the match played at the much-reduced capacity of Leicester City's stadium, there were 28,545 spectators, the lowest number for a Charity Shield or Community Shield game (excluding the 2020 match which had no fans in attendance) since 23,988 watched Burnley beat Manchester City 1–0 at Maine Road in 1973.

Leicester City were the holders, having won the 2021 edition, but did not qualify for this match as they finished eighth in the Premier League and were knocked out in the FA Cup fourth round.

The game was televised live in the United Kingdom on ITV.

== Background ==
Liverpool obtained their FA Community Shield position by virtue of their victory in the 2021–22 FA Cup, having defeated Chelsea 6–5 on penalties following a 0–0 draw after extra time in the final. Manchester City won their spot after winning the 2021–22 Premier League. This was a rematch of the 2019 Community Shield, which Manchester City had won on penalties.

== Match ==
=== Summary ===
In the 21st minute, Mohamed Salah passed to Trent Alexander-Arnold from the right and he opened the scoring with a curling effort from the edge of the box which took a slight deflection off Nathan Aké and nestled in the left corner of the net. With twenty minutes to go, Manchester City equalised when Julián Alvarez scored by poking the ball into the net from close range after Liverpool goalkeeper Adrián had initially saved a shot from substitute Phil Foden. The goal was awarded after a lengthy VAR check. With seven minutes left, Liverpool were awarded a penalty after Rúben Dias had handled a header from substitute Darwin Núñez with his right hand inside the penalty area. Salah scored the penalty with a low shot to the right corner. In the fourth minute of injury time, Núñez made it 3–1 when he stooped low to head the ball to the net after the ball was headed down to him from the left by Andy Robertson after an initial cross from the right by Salah.

=== Details ===
30 July 2022
17:00 BST

Liverpool	3–1	Manchester City
Alexander-Arnold 21'; Salah 83' (pen.); Núñez 90+4'	Report	Alvarez 70'

King Power Stadium, Leicester
Attendance: 28,545
Referee: Craig Pawson (Sheffield & Hallamshire)

Liverpool	Manchester City

GK	13	(Spain) Adrián
RB	66	(England) Trent Alexander-Arnold		(substituted off) 74'
CB	32	(Cameroon) Joël Matip
CB	4	(Netherlands) Virgil van Dijk
LB	26	(Scotland) Andy Robertson
CM	14	(England) Jordan Henderson (c)		(substituted off) 73'
CM	3	(Brazil) Fabinho
CM	6	(Spain) Thiago Alcântara		(substituted off) 85'
RF	11	(Egypt) Mohamed Salah		(substituted off) 90+5'
CF	9	(Brazil) Roberto Firmino		(substituted off) 59'
LF	23	(Colombia) Luis Díaz		(substituted off) 90'
Substitutes:
GK	95	(England) Harvey Davies
DF	2	(England) Joe Gomez
DF	5	(France) Ibrahima Konaté
MF	7	(England) James Milner		(substituted on) 74'
MF	8	(Guinea) Naby Keïta		(substituted on) 85'
MF	17	(England) Curtis Jones		(substituted on) 90+5'
MF	19	(England) Harvey Elliott		(substituted on) 73'
FW	27	(Uruguay) Darwin Núñez	(yellow card) 90+5'	(substituted on) 59'
FW	28	(Portugal) Fábio Carvalho		(substituted on) 90'
Manager:
(Germany) Jürgen Klopp

GK	31	(Brazil) Ederson
RB	2	(England) Kyle Walker
CB	3	(Portugal) Rúben Dias (c)	(yellow card) 83'
CB	6	(Netherlands) Nathan Aké
LB	7	(Portugal) João Cancelo
CM	17	(Belgium) Kevin De Bruyne		(substituted off) 73'
CM	16	(Spain) Rodri
CM	20	(Portugal) Bernardo Silva
RF	26	(Algeria) Riyad Mahrez		(substituted off) 58'
CF	9	(Norway) Erling Haaland
LF	10	(England) Jack Grealish		(substituted off) 58'
Substitutes:
GK	18	(Germany) Stefan Ortega
DF	5	(England) John Stones
DF	79	(England) Luke Mbete
DF	97	(England) Josh Wilson-Esbrand
MF	4	(England) Kalvin Phillips
MF	8	(Germany) İlkay Gündoğan		(substituted on) 73'
MF	47	(England) Phil Foden		(substituted on) 58'
MF	80	(England) Cole Palmer
FW	19	(Argentina) Julián Alvarez		(substituted on) 58'
Manager:
(Spain) Pep Guardiola

Man of the Match:
Mohamed Salah (Liverpool)

Assistant referees:
Harry Lennard (Sussex)
Nick Hopton (Derbyshire)
Fourth official:
Darren England (Sheffield & Hallamshire)
Reserve assistant referee:
Tim Wood (Gloucestershire)
Video assistant referee:
John Brooks (Leicestershire)
Assistant video assistant referee:
Lee Betts (Norfolk)

Match rules

- 90 minutes
- Penalty shoot-out if scores still level
- Nine named substitutes, of which six may be used
