= Ainsley Maitland-Niles =

English footballer (born 1997)

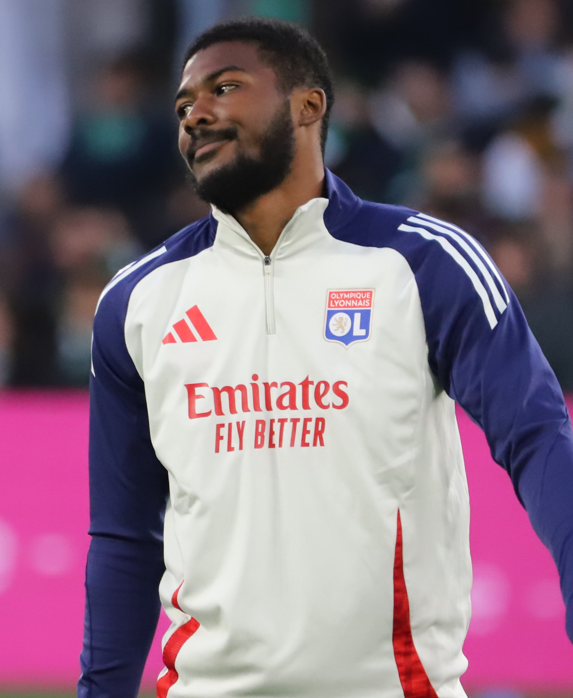
- Maitland-Niles warming up for Lyon in 2025

Personal information
- Full name: Ainsley Cory Maitland-Niles
- Date of birth: 29 August 1997 (age 29)
- Place of birth: Goodmayes, England
- Height: 5 ft 11 in (1.80 m)
- Position: Right-back

Team information
- Current team: Everton
- Number: 2

Youth career
- 2003–2014: Arsenal

Senior career*
Years	Team	Apps	(Gls)
2014–2023	Arsenal	72	(1)
2015–2016	→ Ipswich Town (loan)	30	(1)
2021	→ West Bromwich Albion (loan)	12	(0)
2022	→ Roma (loan)	8	(0)
2022–2023	→ Southampton (loan)	22	(0)
2023–2026	Lyon	85	(3)
2026–	Everton	5	(1)

International career
2014	England U17	3	(0)
2014–2015	England U18	4	(1)
2015–2016	England U19	11	(2)
2016–2017	England U20	16	(1)
2017–2018	England U21	4	(0)
2020	England	5	(0)
Medal record
Men's football
Representing England
FIFA U-20 World Cup
Winner	2017
- * Club domestic league appearances and goals as of 18:14, 17 October 2026 (UTC)

Ainsley Cory Maitland-Niles (born 29 August 1997) is an English professional footballer who plays as a right-back for Premier League club Everton.

Maitland-Niles started his career at Arsenal and made his professional debut in 2014. He spent the 2015–16 season on loan at Ipswich Town, and the second half of the 2020–21 and 2021–22 seasons on loan at West Bromwich Albion and Roma respectively. During the 2022–23 season, he was on loan at Southampton before joining Lyon after his contract at Arsenal expired. Maitland-Niles joined Everton in 2026. Internationally, he has represented England from under-17 to senior level.

== Early life ==
Maitland-Niles was born in Goodmayes, Greater London, being raised in Ilford, East London and attended Oaks Park High School, Ilford. He grew up in a single parent family with his mother, Jule Niles, and his brother, Cordi. He is of Jamaican descent.

== Club career ==
=== Arsenal ===
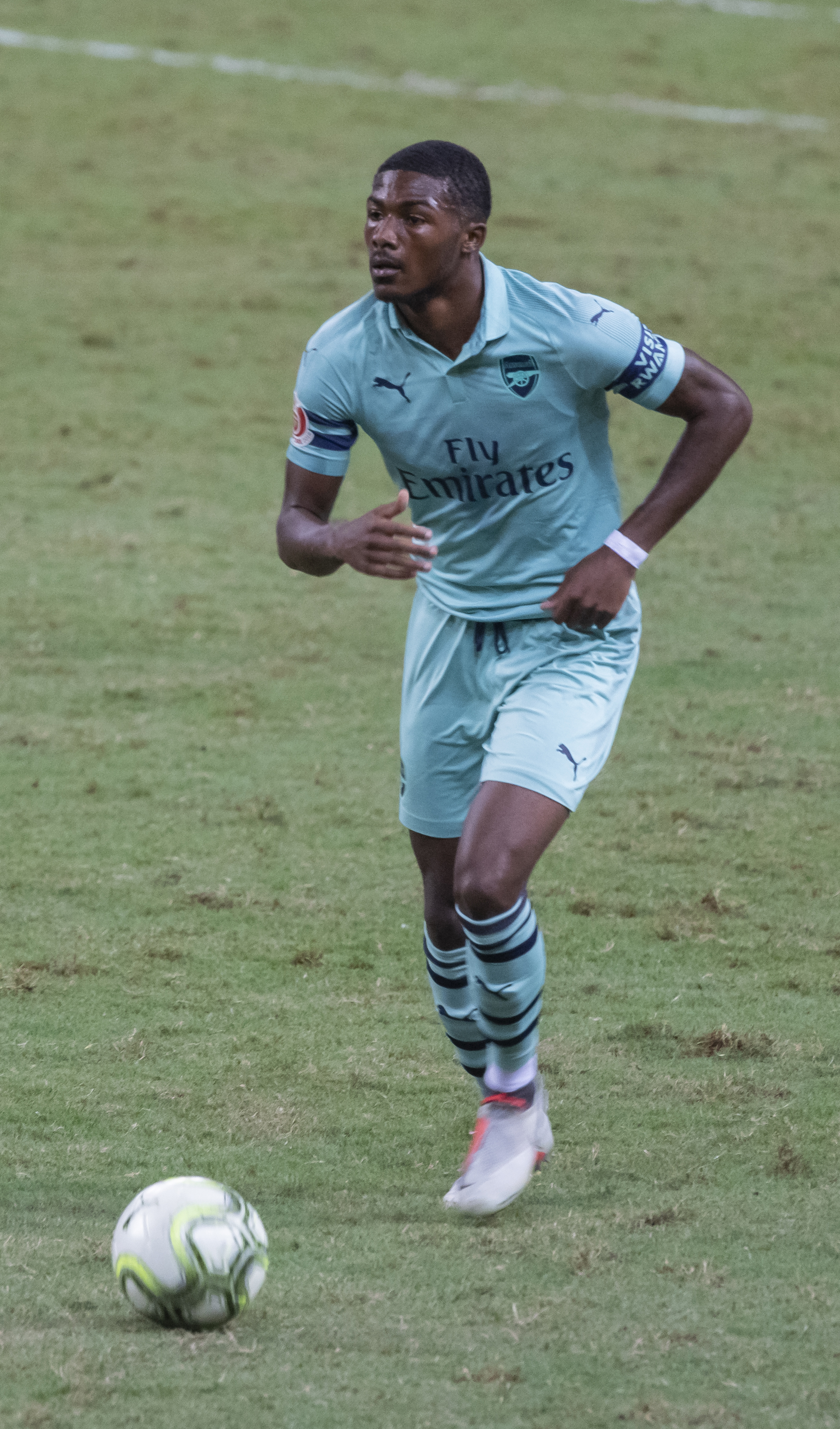
Maitland-Niles playing for Arsenal in 2018.

==== Early career ====
Maitland-Niles is a product of Arsenal's academy having joined the club at the age of six. Maitland-Niles made the step up to Arsenal's U21s during the 2013–14 season, having broken into the U18 set up the season before. He signed his first professional contract with Arsenal on 24 October 2014.

On 9 December 2014, Maitland-Niles made his professional debut at the age of 17 years and 102 days in a UEFA Champions League match against Galatasaray, replacing Aaron Ramsey at half time in an eventual 4–1 win for Arsenal. In doing so he became the second youngest player to have represented Arsenal in the Champions League, behind Jack Wilshere. Four days later, he made his Premier League debut, replacing Alex Oxlade-Chamberlain in added time in a 4–1 win against Newcastle United.

==== 2015–16: Loan to Ipswich Town ====
On 2 July 2015, Maitland-Niles signed for Ipswich Town on a season-long loan for the 2015–16 season. Upon joining the club, he was given a number seven shirt ahead of a new season.

Maitland-Niles made his Ipswich Town debut, starting the whole game before being substituted in the 82nd minute, in a 2–2 draw against Brentford in the opening game of the season. Since making his Ipswich Town debut, Maitland-Niles' performances immediately made an impact and was praised by manager Mick McCarthy, describing him as "outstanding". His performance then saw him being named the club's player of the month for September. He scored his first goal for Ipswich and his first ever senior goal in a 2–0 win over Bolton Wanderers on 3 November 2015. His second goal for the club came on 19 January 2016, in a 2–1 loss against Portsmouth in the third round replay of the FA Cup. Later in the season, however, Maitland-Niles' first-team opportunities was soon limited, due to injuries and competitions, leading him to play for the reserve side. After making thirty-two appearances and scoring two times in all competitions, Maitland-Niles returned to his parent club.

==== 2017–2020 ====
On his return to Arsenal in the following season, Maitland-Niles started a match away at the City Ground against Nottingham Forest in the EFL Cup at right-back. Maitland-Niles again started at centre midfield against Southampton in an FA Cup fourth-round game in an eventual 5–0 win for Arsenal. He came on as a substitute in the 74th minute in Arsenal's 2–0 win against Sutton United in the fifth round of the FA Cup. Maitland-Niles established himself as a regular first-team player in Arsène Wenger's final season as manager of the club, making 28 total appearances in all competitions. On 12 June 2018, he signed a long-term contract at Arsenal.

On 12 August 2018, in Unai Emery's first match as manager, Maitland-Niles started at left-back. However, he would be subbed off 35 minutes into the match, after suffering a broken leg. After his return from his leg break, and a season-ending injury for Héctor Bellerín, Maitland-Niles established himself as Emery's starting right-back for the remainder of the season. On 29 December 2018, he scored his first goal for the club, in a 5–1 Premier League defeat to Liverpool at Anfield. Maitland-Niles scored his first UEFA Europa League goal on 14 March 2019, scoring Arsenal's second in a 3–0 quarter-final second-leg victory against Stade Rennais at the Emirates Stadium.

With Bellerín still working his way back from injury, Maitland-Niles kept his place as Arsenal's starting right-back for the opening games of the 2019–20 Premier League. On 22 September 2019, Maitland-Niles received a red card during the first half of Arsenal's 3–2 victory against Aston Villa at the Emirates Stadium. His sending off came after he received yellow cards in both the eleventh and 41st minutes. He scored his first EFL Cup goal against Liverpool in a 5–5 draw (Liverpool won on penalties) at Anfield. On 1 August 2020, Maitland-Niles was selected to start in the FA Cup Final against Chelsea, as Arsenal won their 14th FA Cup.

Maitland-Niles started the 2020 FA Community Shield on 29 August, taking and scoring the second penalty in a penalty shoot-out win against Liverpool after the match ended 1–1. In the FA Community Shield, Maitland-Niles was awarded the man of the match. Maitland-Niles later struggled to secure a place in Mikel Arteta's first team, with interest coming from West Brom and Southampton to sign him on loan.

==== 2021–2023: Loans to West Bromwich Albion, Roma and Southampton ====
On 1 February 2021, Maitland-Niles joined fellow Premier League club West Bromwich Albion on a loan deal until the end of the season. He made his debut in a 0–2 defeat to Tottenham in the Premier League on 7 February.

During the summer of 2021, Maitland-Niles was linked with a move away from Arsenal, with Everton reportedly interested in signing him on loan. The potential move fell through however, and on 30 August 2021, Maitland-Niles publicly expressed his desire to leave the club via social media, stating that he wished to go where he was "wanted" and where he was going to play.

On 8 January 2022, Maitland-Niles joined Serie A club Roma on a loan deal until the end of the season. On 1 September 2022, Maitland-Niles joined Southampton on a season-long loan.

On 16 June 2023, Arsenal announced that Maitland-Niles would be leaving the club following the expiration of his contract.

=== Lyon ===
On 7 August 2023, Maitland-Niles joined French club Lyon on a four-year deal on a free transfer. On 7 January 2024, he scored his first goal against Pontarlier in a round of 64 match in the Coupe de France.

=== Everton ===
On 1 September 2026, Maitland-Niles signed a three-year contract with Everton. On 6 September, Maitland-Niles came on as a substitute for his Everton debut and scored from outside the box in stoppage time to equalise against Manchester United and secure a 2–2 draw.

== International career ==
Maitland-Niles has played for England at various levels within the youth setup of the Three Lions. He made three appearances for England U17 in 2014.

He was then called up by England U18 in November 2014 and scored on his debut, in a 3–2 win over Poland U18. He went on to make four appearances for the England U18 side.

In September 2015, Maitland-Niles was called up by England U19 and scored on his England U19 debut, in a 3–2 win over Germany U19 on 4 September 2015. He scored again the following month, in a 2–0 win over Macedonia U19. He was then included in the England U19 squad for the UEFA European Under-19 Championship that saw them reach the semi-final of the tournament.

On 1 September 2016, Maitland-Niles scored on his England U20 debut, in a 1–1 draw against Brazil U20. In May 2017 he was called up to England's squad for the 2017 FIFA U-20 World Cup in South Korea. England eventually got to the final of the tournament where they were up against Venezuela. Maitland-Niles, who came on in the 75th minute of play, went on to win the 2017 FIFA U-20 World Cup as England beat Venezuela by a 1–0 margin. This was the first time England had ever won the Under-20 World Cup.

On 29 August 2020, Maitland-Niles was called up to the England senior squad by Gareth Southgate for the UEFA Nations League matches against Iceland and Denmark. He made his debut on 8 September coming on as a substitute against Denmark.

== Style of play ==
Maitland-Niles is known for his versatility, with his pace and energy, he can play as a winger, central midfielder, full-back, and wing-back, though he prefers playing on the wing, describing it as "his natural position."

In December 2017, his then-Arsenal manager, Arsene Wenger, praised Maitland-Niles as "a good defender", saying that "he has that sense of one against one" and "has very quick recovery runs."

== Media ==
Maitland-Niles was involved in the Amazon Original sports docuseries All or Nothing: Arsenal, which documented the club by spending time with the coaching staff and players behind the scenes both on and off the field throughout their 2021–22 season.

== Career statistics ==
=== Club ===
As of match played 11 October 2026

Appearances and goals by club, season and competition
Club	Season	League			National cup (Note: Includes FA Cup, Coppa Italia, Coupe de France)		League cup (Note: Includes EFL Cup)		Europe		Other		Total	
Club	Season	Division	Apps	Goals	Apps	Goals	Apps	Goals	Apps	Goals	Apps	Goals	Apps	Goals
Arsenal	2014–15	Premier League	1	0	1	0	0	0	1 (Note: Appearance(s) in UEFA Champions League)	0	0	0	3	0
Arsenal	2016–17	Premier League	1	0	3	0	3	0	0	0	—		7	0
Arsenal	2017–18	Premier League	15	0	1	0	3	0	9 (Note: Appearances in UEFA Europa League)	0	0	0	28	0
Arsenal	2018–19	Premier League	16	1	2	0	2	0	10	1	—		30	2
Arsenal	2019–20	Premier League	20	0	5	0	1	1	6	0	—		32	1
Arsenal	2020–21	Premier League	11	0	1	0	3	0	5	0	1 (Note: Appearance in FA Community Shield)	0	21	0
Arsenal	2021–22	Premier League	8	0	0	0	3	0	—		—		11	0
Arsenal	Total		72	1	13	0	15	1	31	1	1	0	132	3
Ipswich Town (loan)	2015–16	Championship	30	1	2	1	0	0	—		—		32	2
West Bromwich Albion (loan)	2020–21	Premier League	12	0	—		—		—		—		12	0
Roma (loan)	2021–22	Serie A	8	0	1	0	—		3 (Note: Appearances in UEFA Europa Conference League)	0	—		12	0
Southampton (loan)	2022–23	Premier League	22	0	2	0	2	0	—		—		26	0
Lyon	2023–24	Ligue 1	23	1	6	1	—		—		—		29	2
Lyon	2024–25	Ligue 1	32	1	1	0	—		11	0	—		44	1
Lyon	2025–26	Ligue 1	30	1	4	0	—		8	1	—		42	2
Lyon	2026–27	Ligue 1	0	0	—		—		4	1	—		4	1
Lyon	Total		85	3	11	1	—		23	2	—		119	6
Everton	2026–27	Premier League	4	1	0	0	1	0	—		—		5	1
Career total			233	6	29	2	18	1	57	3	1	0	338	12

=== International ===
As of match played 18 November 2020

Appearances and goals by national team and year
National team	Year	Apps	Goals
England	2020	5	0
Total		5	0

== Honours ==
Arsenal

- FA Cup: 2019–20
- FA Community Shield: 2017, 2020
- EFL Cup runner-up: 2017–18
- UEFA Europa League runner-up: 2018–19

Roma

- UEFA Europa Conference League: 2021–22

Lyon

- Coupe de France runner-up: 2023–24

England U20

- FIFA U-20 World Cup: 2017
