= Reiss Nelson =

English footballer (born 1998)

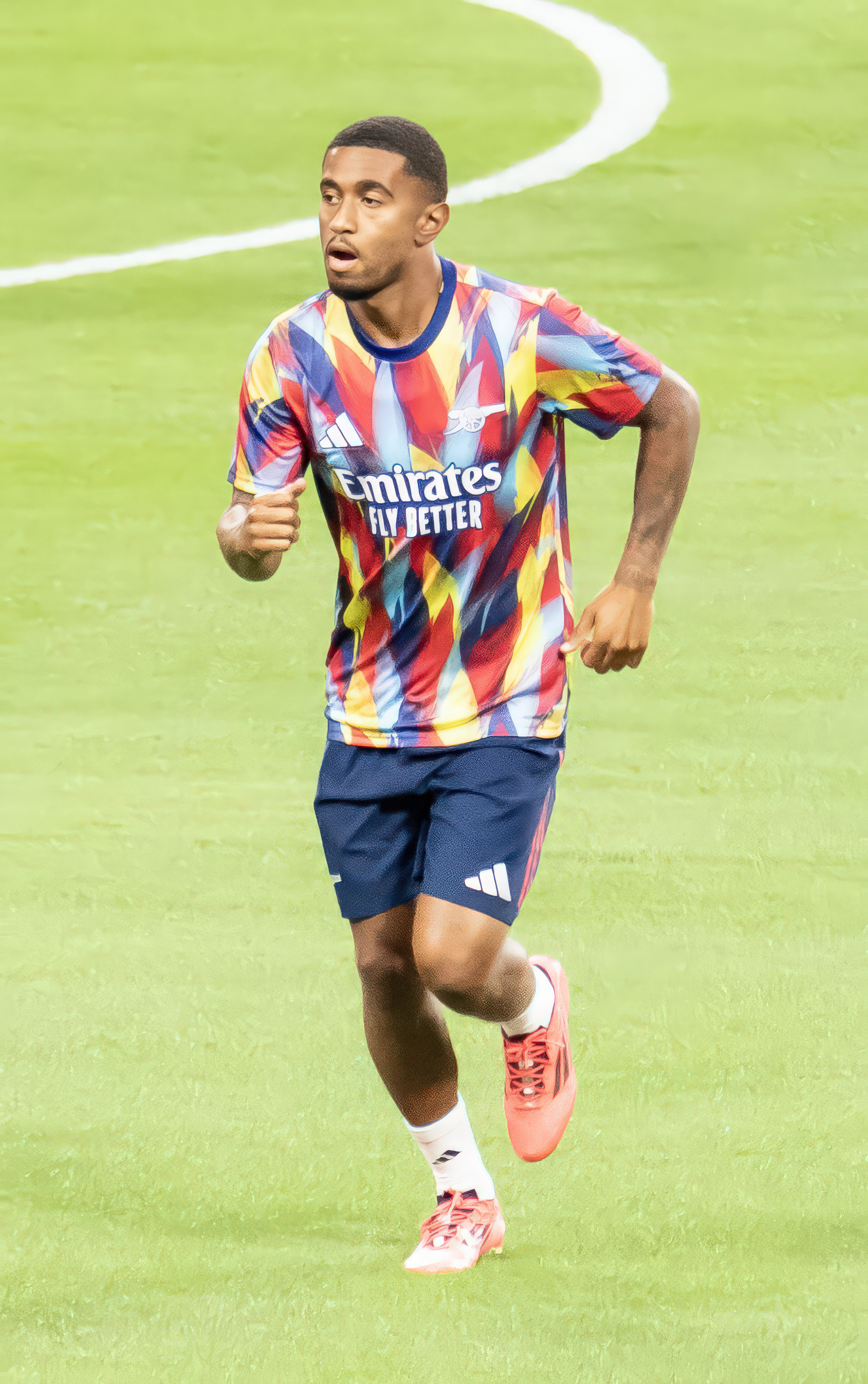
- Nelson with Arsenal in 2025

Personal information
- Full name: Reiss Luke Nelson
- Date of birth: 10 December 1999 (age 26)
- Place of birth: Elephant and Castle, England
- Height: 5 ft 9 in (1.75 m)
- Position: Winger

Team information
- Current team: Feyenoord
- Number: 17

Youth career
- 2008–2017: Arsenal

Senior career*
Years	Team	Apps	(Gls)
2017–2026	Arsenal	50	(4)
2018–2019	→ TSG Hoffenheim (loan)	23	(7)
2021–2022	→ Feyenoord (loan)	21	(2)
2024–2025	→ Fulham (loan)	11	(1)
2025–2026	→ Brentford (loan)	10	(0)
2026–	Feyenoord	1	(0)

International career
2014–2015	England U16	3	(1)
2015–2016	England U17	11	(11)
2016–2017	England U18	3	(1)
2017–2018	England U19	9	(3)
2018	England U20	1	(0)
2018–2020	England U21	12	(6)
- * Club domestic league appearances and goals as of 16:15, 20 September 2026 (UTC)

Reiss Luke Nelson (born 10 December 1999) is an English professional footballer who plays as a winger for Eredivisie club Feyenoord.

Born in London, Nelson joined Arsenal's academy when he was nine years old and gradually made his way to the first-team, regularly playing above his age group. He made his Arsenal debut in the 2017 FA Community Shield before leaving the club on loan in search of first-team football. After gaining experience at German side TSG Hoffenheim during the 2018–19 season, he returned to Arsenal where new manager Mikel Arteta used Nelson sparingly due to injury. He then moved to the Netherlands on loan at Feyenoord where he made a positive impact on their season and received more first-team action. Nelson joined Fulham on loan for the duration of the 2024–25 season.

Nelson has represented England with every youth international team since debuting for the under-16's in November 2014. He has played in several youth UEFA European Championships, and he was selected in the 2016 under-17 edition's Team of the Tournament for his performances in England's quarter-final finish.

== Early and personal life ==
Nelson was born in Elephant and Castle, South London, England. He is of Jamaican descent through his mother. He grew up in the Aylesbury Estate in Walworth and attended the London Nautical School, which trains young men from Inner London, often with maritime and sporting backgrounds. Nelson played football at the school in conjunction with his training at Arsenal and still acts as a mentor there. He became friends with fellow aspiring footballer Jadon Sancho, who lived nearby, after they played together in youth tournaments; Nelson and Sancho were among many successful footballers from the Borough of Lambeth and South London at the time, including Tammy Abraham, Ademola Lookman and Tashan Oakley-Boothe. Nelson has described his younger self as a "cheeky chappie" and someone who was "very loud", which he said often led him into trouble. Nelson accredits his mother for his success at youth level, for ensuring he got to training on time and working two jobs to sustain Nelson, his brother and his sister in their youth; he came from a poor family and driving to and from training was often a "big sacrifice".

== Club career ==
=== Arsenal ===
==== 2008–2018: Early career ====
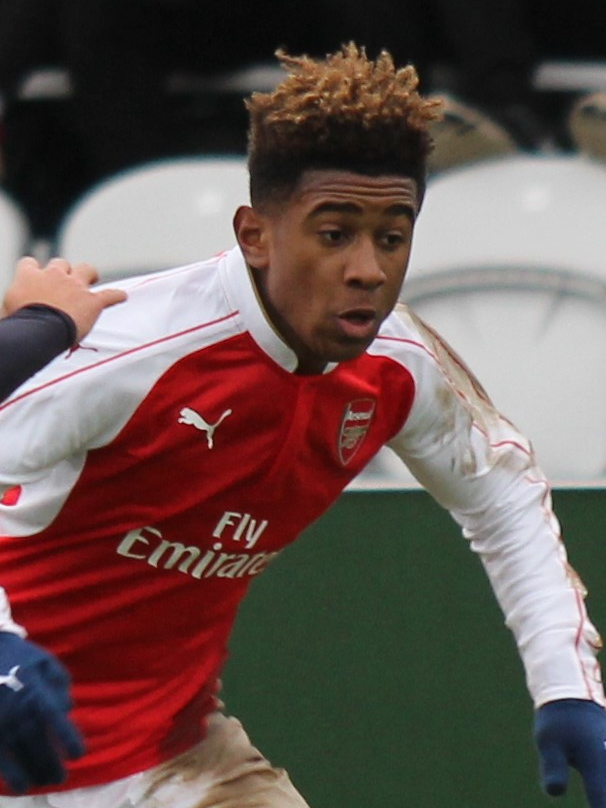
Nelson playing for Arsenal in 2015

Nelson joined the Arsenal Academy in 2008, when he was eight years old. Throughout his long youth career at Arsenal, he was regarded as one of the club's most promising young players; he often impressed the youth coaches at the club and regularly played above his age group. Before making his senior debut in 2017, he was playing in the under-21 youth team, five years above his age group. Nelson signed his first professional contract in December 2016, following his 17th birthday.

Ahead of Arsenal's 2017–18 season, Nelson was named in Arsène Wenger's pre-season touring squad travelling to both Australia and China. On 13 July 2017, he made his unofficial debut for Arsenal against Sydney FC in a friendly; during the game Nelson played on the right-wing, dribbling balls towards the byline and setting up teammates Joe Willock and Danny Welbeck regularly. Whilst on tour, he also played against Western Sydney Wanderers at the Stadium Australia, Bayern Munich at the Shanghai Stadium, and Chelsea at Bird's Nest Stadium in Beijing. Nelson made his first competitive appearance against Chelsea in the 2017 FA Community Shield; he came on as a substitute for Welbeck as Arsenal won 4–1 on penalties after the match had ended in a draw.

During the season, Nelson was limited to mostly cup and European appearances for the first-team, including five UEFA Europa League appearances, three EFL Cup matches and one FA Cup loss against Nottingham Forest. He made his Premier League debut in a 4–1 win over Crystal Palace at the Emirates Stadium on 20 January 2018; he came on as a substitute in the 72nd minute. With fellow winger Alexis Sánchez having left Arsenal, it was speculated that Nelson could get an extended run in the first-team in his absence; however, he only made two more Premier League appearances during the season. Arsenal finished the league season in sixth and Wenger announced his departure from the club.

Still playing youth football for the under-23 side, Nelson helped Arsenal win the Premier League 2, in the Professional Development League; he also helped his side reach the final of the Premier League International Cup. Nelson scored 10 goals in all youth competitions and was awarded PL2 Player of the Season.

==== 2018–2020: Hoffenheim loan, Emery's tenure and Arteta's arrival ====
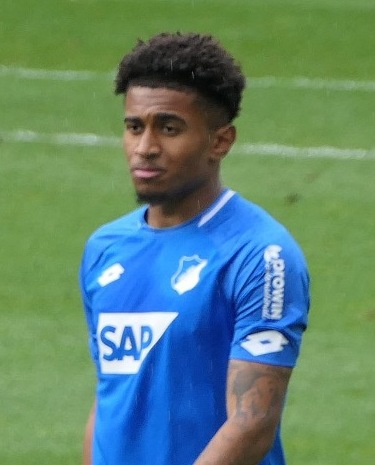
Nelson playing for TSG Hoffenheim in 2019.

On 31 August 2018, Nelson signed a long-term contract with Arsenal, and new Arsenal coach Unai Emery then sent him on a season-long loan at German club TSG Hoffenheim. During his Hoffenheim debut against Fortuna Düsseldorf on 18 September, he scored within 14 minutes of entering the match, although it was only a consolation in the 2–1 defeat. Nelson scored six Bundesliga goals in his first seven appearances for Hoffenheim, including a wide curling strike against Bayer Leverkusen in November. Head coach Julian Nagelsmann dropped Nelson ahead of Hoffenheim's 2–1 win over 1. FC Nürnberg in what was described as an "educational measure" for being late to training. Following an injury in January, Nelson struggled to make an impact in the latter stages of Hoffenheim's season; he finished the season with seven goals in 29 appearances for the German side.

Nelson returned to Arsenal following his loan in Germany. He was brought into the first team along with fellow academy graduate Emile Smith Rowe as Emery looked to focus on youth talent in his second season; he was also given the number 24 shirt. Nelson made successive starts in Arsenal's opening two Premier League games against Newcastle United and Burnley; against Burnley he looked to have scored a goal from a slick passing move and a confident finish, but it was ruled out for offside in the buildup. Nelson scored his first senior Arsenal goal on 24 September 2019, when Arsenal defeated Nottingham Forest 5–0 at the Emirates Stadium in the EFL Cup third round; it was the fourth goal of the match and it was scored after he received a drilled pass from Calum Chambers. Nelson received a knee injury whilst on youth international duty in October, and he did not return to the Arsenal first team until December.

In November, Emery left Arsenal and was replaced by interim coach Freddie Ljungberg, the Swede was later replaced by former club captain Mikel Arteta. Nelson scored against Leeds United in Arsenal's 1–0 win in the FA Cup third round in January 2020, but was injured later in the month; he returned from injury against Portsmouth in March. Following a short suspension due to the COVID-19 pandemic, Arsenal resumed Premier League football in June; Nelson later scored his first Premier League goal against Liverpool at the Emirates Stadium in July. He was an unused substitute when Arsenal won their 14th FA Cup against Chelsea on 1 August.

==== 2020–2022: Lack of minutes and loan to Feyenoord ====
In Arsenal's 2020 FA Community Shield match against Liverpool, Nelson came on as a substitute, taking and scoring the first penalty in a shootout win after the game ended 1–1. He scored his first goal in European competition on 26 November against Norwegian side Molde in the UEFA Europa League; all four of Nelson's goals for Arsenal at this point were scored in different competitions, those being the Premier League, FA Cup, EFL Cup and UEFA Europa League. He only made nine appearances during Arsenal's 2020–21 campaign; injuries hindered Nelson during the season, limiting him to just 69 minutes of Premier League football.

Nelson joined Eredivisie side Feyenoord on loan in August 2021; his squad number was 14 during his stay in the Netherlands. Feyenoord sporting director Frank Arnesen said that the club followed Nelson for several months; Arnesen also described him as "a rapid boy, good with his feet, who makes things very difficult for defenders in one-on-ones." Nelson was injured in training not long after joining the club, delaying his debut; his first appearance for the club came against RKC Waalwijk in the Eredivisie, where he came on as a substitute for 30 minutes at the end of the 2–2 draw. Nelson scored four goals for Feyenoord during his time at the club; he also helped his side reach the inaugural UEFA Europa Conference League final, which they lost 1–0 to José Mourinho's Roma in Tirana, Albania.

==== 2022–2024: Arsenal return ====
Upon returning to Arsenal for the 2022–23 season, Nelson made his first appearance on 6 October 2022 against Bodø/Glimt in the UEFA Europa League; his appearance in the reverse fixture in Norway a week later was his 50th for the Arsenal first team. At the end of the month, he scored a brace (two goals) and assisted Thomas Partey's goal in their 5–0 Premier League win over Nottingham Forest after coming on as a substitute for Bukayo Saka.

In Arsenal's Premier League match against AFC Bournemouth on 4 March 2023 at the Emirates Stadium, Nelson came on as a substitute for Smith Rowe with Bournemouth leading Arsenal 2–1. He then set up Ben White from the left wing to level the match at 2–2, almost immediately after entering the game. In search of a match winner, Nelson scored a 25-yard strike after collecting a half-cleared corner in the seventh minute of added time. His goal was followed by jubilant celebrations in the stadium with most Arsenal players and staff rushing to embrace Nelson; the win extended Arsenal's pursuit of a first league title in 19 years. Arsenal eventually lost the title to Manchester City, but Nelson was voted Premier League Game Changer of the Season for his performance against Bournemouth, and his winning goal was voted by club supporters as Arsenal Goal of the Season. Journalist Charles Watts characterised the goal as "one of those moments in football that genuinely took the breath away – when despair turned into elation in a blink of an eye."

Ahead of the new season, Nelson signed a new four-year contract with Arsenal, Arteta commented on Nelson's ability and importance to Arsenal saying that "Reiss knows how important he is to our squad with the quality he has". He made his first appearance of the season against Manchester United in the Premier League at the Emirates Stadium on 3 September, and later scored his first goal of the season against Brentford in the EFL Cup on 27 September; it was the only goal of the match. Arsenal finished second in the league again behind Manchester City. Despite just signing a long-term contract, it was speculated that Nelson might leave Arsenal in the 2024 Summer transfer window, as he made only one Premier League start for the club during the entire season. In June, it was reported that he was assessing transfer options to potentially leave the club.

==== 2024–2026: Fulham and Brentford loans ====
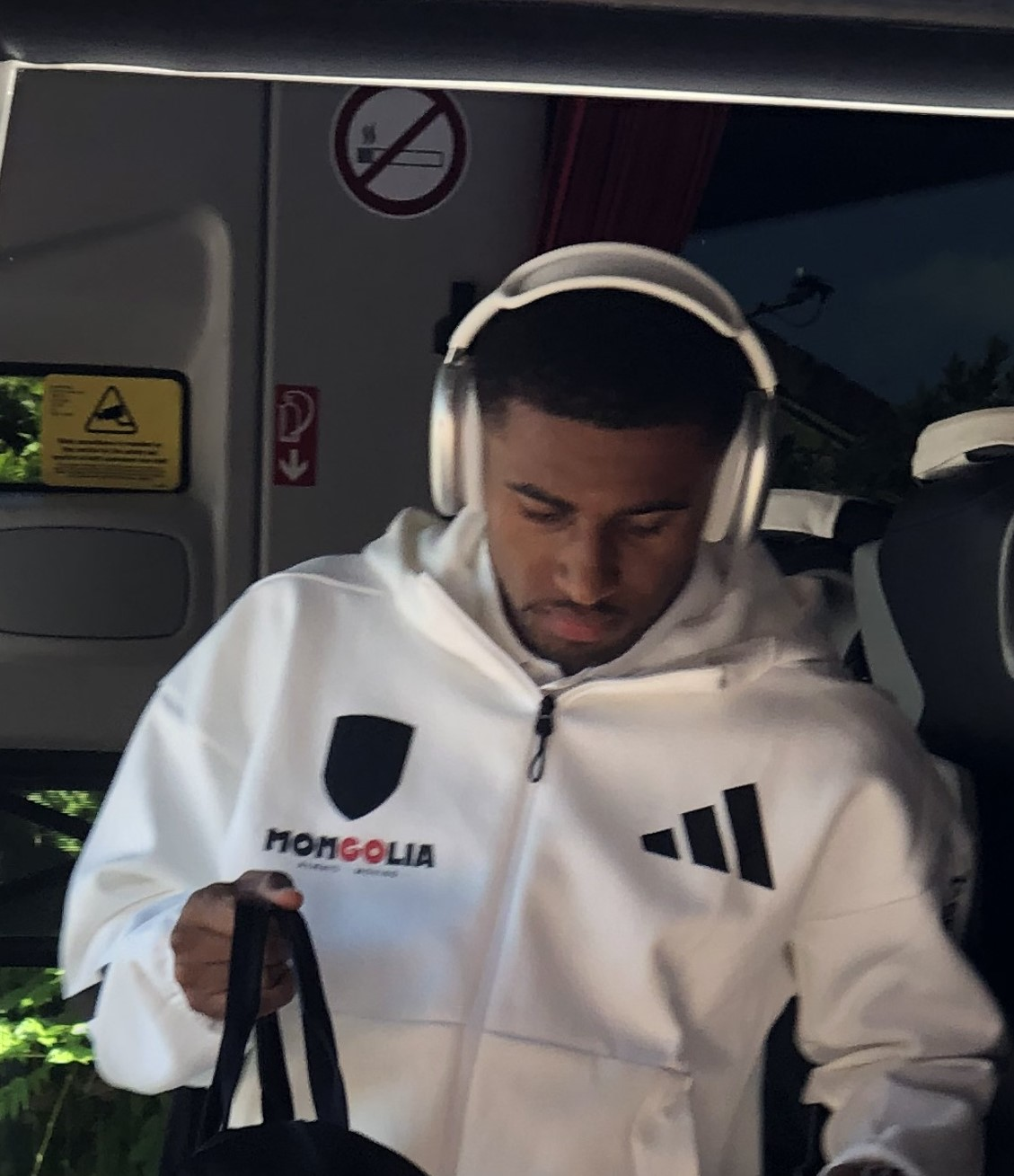
Nelson with Fulham in 2024

With winger Raheem Sterling on the verge of joining Arsenal, Nelson joined Fulham on a season-long loan on deadline day. He made his first appearance for the club against West Ham United on 14 September. Three days later, he scored his first goal for the club against Preston North End in the third round of the EFL Cup, a tie Fulham lost 16–15 in a penalty shootout after drawing 1–1. On 21 September, he scored his first Premier League goal for Fulham in a 3–1 over Newcastle United. Nelson's season ended after suffering a hamstring injury during a Premier League match against Brighton & Hove Albion in December.

On 1 September 2025, Nelson joined Premier League club Brentford on a season-long loan. Nelson marked his first start for the club with a goal and an assist in a 5–0 EFL Cup triumph over Grimsby Town on 28 October. Upon returning, Nelson terminated his contract with Arsenal by mutual consent, leaving after spending 18 years with the club.

=== Return to Feyenoord ===
On 2 September 2026, Nelson rejoined Eredivisie club Feyenoord, signing a one-year contract.

== International career ==
Nelson was first picked to represent England in November 2014, when the under-16 coach Steve Cooper selected Nelson to be a part of his 18-man squad to play Scotland on 20 November. He subsequently made his youth international debut starting the match which England won 2–1. Nelson was included in Cooper's squad for the 2016 UEFA European Under-17 Championship, and he helped England reach the quarter-finals where they were knocked out by Spain; Nelson was named in the Team of the Tournament for his performances with England. During the under-19's 2018 UEFA European championship qualification campaign, Nelson scored twice against Hungary in March 2018. Despite England qualifying for the tournament, he was one of a number of players withdrawn from selection for the tournament by their club. On his under-21 debut against Andorra, he scored the sixth goal in England's 7–0 win at the Proact Stadium; the win sealed the team's qualification for the 2019 UEFA European Under-21 Championship. During the tournament, Nelson made only one appearance, a 3–3 draw against Croatia in the group stage; he scored England's first goal from a penalty, but it was not enough for England to qualify for the knockout stage.

== Career statistics ==
As of match played 20 September 2026

Appearances and goals by club, season and competition
Club	Season	League			National cup (Note: Includes FA Cup, DFB-Pokal, KNVB Cup)		League cup (Note: Includes EFL Cup)		Europe		Other		Total	
Club	Season	Division	Apps	Goals	Apps	Goals	Apps	Goals	Apps	Goals	Apps	Goals	Apps	Goals
Arsenal	2017–18	Premier League	3	0	1	0	3	0	8 (Note: Appearances in UEFA Europa League)	0	1 (Note: Appearance in FA Community Shield)	0	16	0
Arsenal	2018–19	Premier League	0	0	—		—		—		—		0	0
Arsenal	2019–20	Premier League	17	1	2	1	1	1	2	0	—		22	3
Arsenal	2020–21	Premier League	2	0	1	0	1	0	4	1	1	0	9	1
Arsenal	2021–22	Premier League	1	0	0	0	0	0	—		—		1	0
Arsenal	2022–23	Premier League	11	3	0	0	1	0	6	0	—		18	3
Arsenal	2023–24	Premier League	15	0	1	0	2	1	5 (Note: Appearances in UEFA Champions League)	0	0	0	23	1
Arsenal	2024–25	Premier League	1	0	—		—		—		—		1	0
Arsenal	2025–26	Premier League	0	0	—		—		—		—		0	0
Arsenal	Total		50	4	5	1	8	2	25	1	2	0	90	8
Arsenal U21	2023–24	—			—		—		—		1 (Note: Appearance in EFL Trophy)	0	1	0
TSG Hoffenheim (loan)	2018–19	Bundesliga	23	7	1	0	—		5	0	—		29	7
Feyenoord (loan)	2021–22	Eredivisie	21	2	1	0	—		10 (Note: Appearances in UEFA Europa Conference League)	2	—		32	4
Fulham (loan)	2024–25	Premier League	11	1	0	0	1	1	—		—		12	2
Brentford (loan)	2025–26	Premier League	10	0	2	0	2	1	—		—		14	1
Feyenoord	2026–27	Eredivisie	1	0	0	0	—		0	0	—		1	0
Career total			116	14	9	1	11	4	40	3	3	0	179	22

== Honours ==
Arsenal U23

- Premier League 2: 2017–18
- Premier League International Cup runner-up: 2017–18

Arsenal

- FA Cup: 2019–20
- FA Community Shield: 2017, 2020

Feyenoord

- UEFA Europa Conference League runner-up: 2021–22

Individual

- UEFA European Under-17 Championship Team of the Tournament: 2016
- Premier League Game Changer of the Season: 2022–23
- Bundesliga Rookie of the Month: October 2018
- PL2 Player of the Season: 2017–18
- Arsenal Goal of the Season: 2022–23
