= 1950 FA Charity Shield =

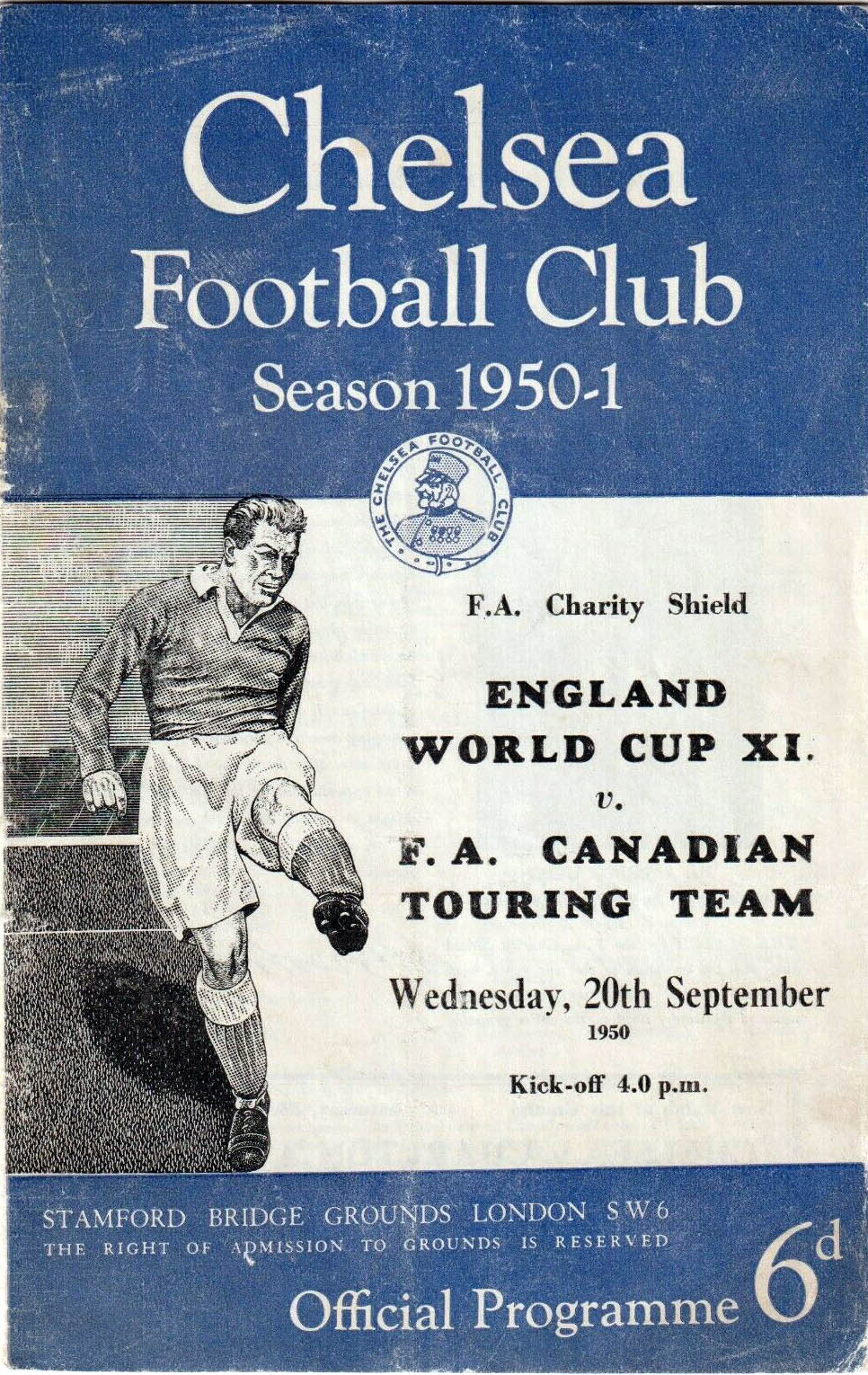
- The match programme cover
- Event: FA Charity Shield
England World Cup XI	F.A. Canadian Touring Team
4	2
- Date: 20 September 1950
- Venue: Stamford Bridge, London
- Referee: Arthur Ellis
- Attendance: 38,468

The 1950 FA Charity Shield was the 28th FA Charity Shield, an early season exhibition football match hosted by The Football Association. The 1950 match was held between the England squad that had competed at the 1950 World Cup, and the squad that had participated in an exhibition tour of Canada in the same summer. While in its early years the format of the Charity Shield had varied, by 1950 the match was an unusual variation from the normal game between the league champion and the FA Cup winner.

== Venue ==
Fulham
Stamford Bridge
Capacity: 38,500
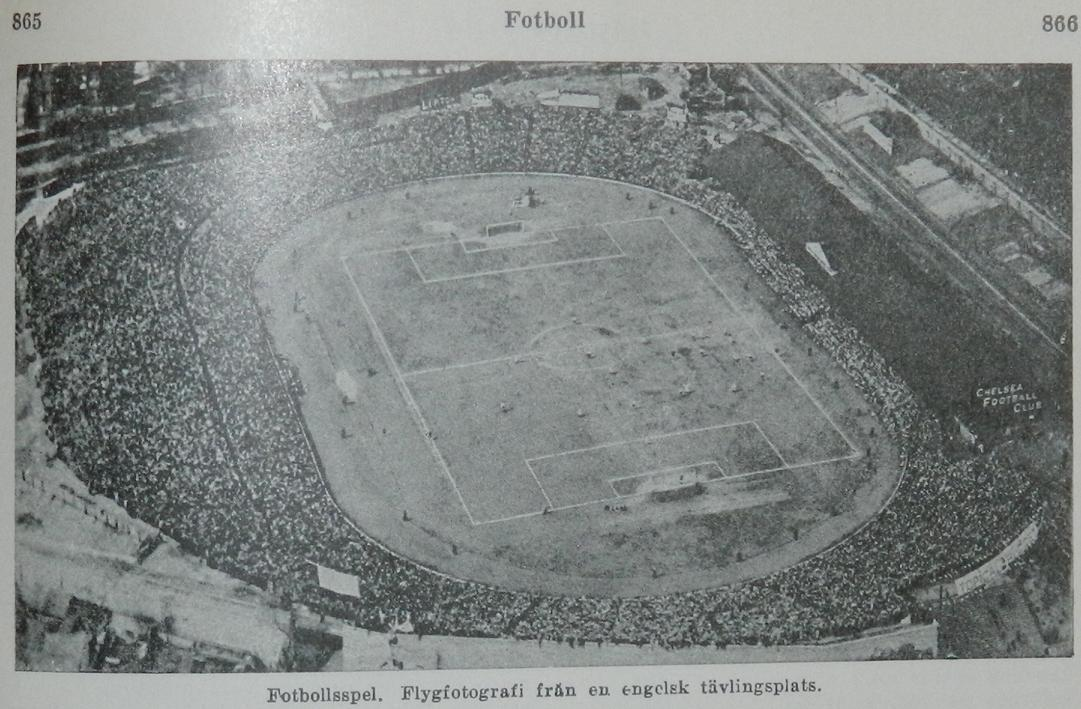

== Overview ==
England had entered the FIFA World Cup for the first time in 1950, having previously missed the tournament due to the FA (and other Home Nations football associations) boycott of FIFA. The tournament had gone badly, with an under-prepared England team eliminated in the first round, including suffering from a 1–0 defeat to the United States, whose team was largely made up of amateurs. The decision to send a team on a goodwill tour — a fairly common practice by the FA at the time — to Canada at the same time as the World Cup is now seen as evidence of this poor preparation, with key players such as Stanley Matthews and Nat Lofthouse unavailable for all or part of the World Cup due to their selection for the tour. This was the last time to date that the Charity Shield was held between two FA teams (in 1913, 1923–26 and 1929 it had been between an England Professional XI and the England amateur team), though an FA XI would later compete in the 1961 FA Charity Shield against the double-winning Tottenham Hotspur team.

The match itself finished 4–2 to the World Cup squad. Matthews, who had been part of both squads, played for the Touring XI. Liverpool F.C. defender Laurie Hughes was badly injured in the match, and never played for England again. He remained at Liverpool for the rest of his career, but the injury is seen as having prevented him from fulfilling his potential.

== Match details ==
20 September 1950

England World Cup XI	4–2	F.A. Canadian Touring Team
Mannion; Mortensen; Baily; Mullen		Johnston; Lofthouse

Stamford Bridge, London
Attendance: 38,468
Referee: Arthur Ellis

England World Cup XI	F.A. Canadian Touring Team

1	(England) Ernest Butler
2	(England) Alf Ramsey
3	(England) Bill Eckersley
4	(England) Billy Wright (c)
5	(England) Laurie Hughes (substituted off)
6	(England) Jimmy Dickinson
7	(England) Tom Finney
8	(England) Wilf Mannion
9	(England) Stan Mortensen
10	(England) Eddie Baily
11	(England) Jimmy Mullen
Substitutes:
12	(England) Jim Taylor (substituted on)
Manager:
(England) Walter Winterbottom

1	(England) Stan Hanson
2	(England) Bert Mozley
3	(England) Stan Milburn
4	(England) Harry Johnston
5	(England) Reg Flewin (c)
6	(England) Tim Ward
7	(England) Stanley Matthews
8	(England) Jackie Sewell
9	(England) Nat Lofthouse
10	(England) Jimmy Hagan
11	(England) Johnny Hancocks
Manager:
?

Match officials

- Assistant referees:
  - R.J. Leafe
  - B.M. Griffiths
