= 1912 FA Charity Shield =

- Event: FA Charity Shield
Blackburn Rovers	Queens Park Rangers
The Football League	Southern Football League
2	1
- Date: 4 May 1912
- Venue: White Hart Lane, London
- Attendance: 7,111

The 1912 Football Association Charity Shield was played on 4 May 1912. The game was played at White Hart Lane, home of Tottenham Hotspur, and was contested by the Football League champions Blackburn Rovers and the winners of the Southern League championship, Queens Park Rangers. The game ended in a 2–1 win for Blackburn Rovers, and the proceeds of the match were donated to the Titanic Relief Fund.

== Match details ==
4 May 1912

Blackburn Rovers	2–1	Queens Park Rangers
Aitkenhead		Revill

White Hart Lane, London
Attendance: 7,111
