= 2020 FA Community Shield =

Annual football match

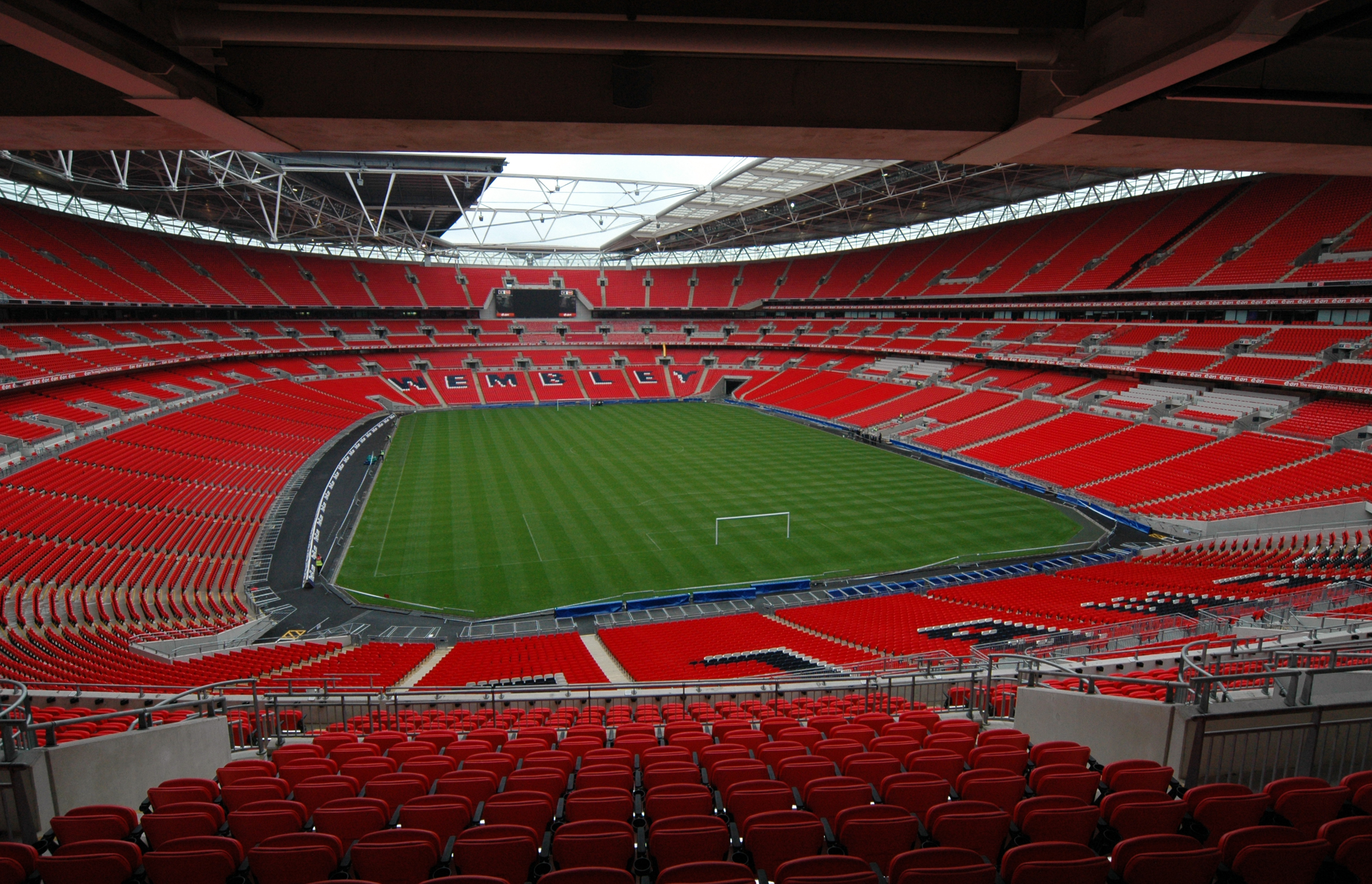
- Wembley Stadium in London hosted the match.
Arsenal	Liverpool
1	1
- Arsenal won 5–4 on penalties
- Date: 29 August 2020
- Venue: Wembley Stadium, London
- Man of the Match: Ainsley Maitland-Niles (Arsenal)
- Referee: Andre Marriner (Birmingham)
- Attendance: 0 (Note: The match was played behind closed doors due to the COVID-19 pandemic in the United Kingdom.)

The 2020 FA Community Shield (also known as The FA Community Shield supported by McDonald's for sponsorship reasons) was the 98th FA Community Shield, an annual football match played between the winners of the previous season's Premier League, Liverpool, and the previous season's FA Cup, Arsenal, with the latter winning on penalties after a 1–1 draw. This was the fourth Charity Shield/Community Shield contested between the two clubs: Liverpool won in 1979 and 1989, while Arsenal were victorious in 2002.

The match was televised live on BT Sport 1, BT Sport Extra 1 and BT Sport Ultimate, with highlights shown later on Match of the Day on BBC One. Radio commentary was provided by Sam Matterface and Trevor Sinclair on Talksport. The game was played behind closed doors on 29 August 2020 at Wembley Stadium and followed the Women's Community Shield match at the same venue, thus forming the first Community Shield double-header.

Manchester City were the holders as winners of the 2019 edition, but did not qualify for this match, as they finished second in the Premier League and were knocked out of the FA Cup in the semi-finals.

== Background ==
Arsenal won their 14th FA Cup title after beating Chelsea 2–1 in the final.

Liverpool won their first Premier League title since the league's formation in 1992, after rivals Manchester City lost 1–2 to Chelsea at Stamford Bridge on 25 June 2020.

== Match ==
=== Summary ===
In the 12th minute, Pierre-Emerick Aubameyang put Arsenal into the lead, receiving the ball on the left he cut in and curled a left-footed shot from just inside the penalty area into the right corner of the net past the diving Alisson. Takumi Minamino made it 1–1 in the 73rd minute with a side-footed finish to the right from six yards out after the ball broke to him in the penalty area off Cédric Soares. The game went to a penalty shoot-out with Liverpool's Rhian Brewster the only player to miss his penalty when he struck the bar. Aubameyang scored the decisive final penalty for Arsenal, shooting to the right corner to win the match 5–4 on penalties.

=== Details ===
29 August 2020
16:30 BST

Arsenal	1–1	Liverpool
Aubameyang 12'	Report	Minamino 73'
Penalties
Nelson (penalty scored); Maitland-Niles (penalty scored); Cédric (penalty scored); David Luiz (penalty scored); Aubameyang (penalty scored)	5–4	(penalty scored) Salah; (penalty scored) Fabinho; (penalty missed) Brewster; (penalty scored) Minamino; (penalty scored) Jones

Wembley Stadium, London
Attendance: 0
Referee: Andre Marriner (Birmingham)

Arsenal	Liverpool

GK	26	(Argentina) Emiliano Martínez
CB	16	(England) Rob Holding
CB	23	(Brazil) David Luiz
CB	3	(Scotland) Kieran Tierney	(substituted off) 83'
RM	2	(Spain) Héctor Bellerín	(substituted off) 58'
CM	25	(Egypt) Mohamed Elneny
CM	34	(Switzerland) Granit Xhaka
LM	15	(England) Ainsley Maitland-Niles
RW	7	(England) Bukayo Saka	(substituted off) 82'
LW	30	(England) Eddie Nketiah	(substituted off) 82'
CF	14	(Gabon) Pierre-Emerick Aubameyang (c)
Substitutes:
GK	1	(Germany) Bernd Leno
DF	4	(France) William Saliba
DF	17	(Portugal) Cédric Soares	(substituted on) 58'
DF	31	(Bosnia and Herzegovina) Sead Kolašinac	(substituted on) 83'
MF	28	(England) Joe Willock	(substituted on) 82'
MF	32	(England) Emile Smith Rowe
MF	54	(England) James Olayinka
FW	24	(England) Reiss Nelson	(substituted on) 82'
FW	47	(England) Tyreece John-Jules
Manager:
(Spain) Mikel Arteta

GK	1	(Brazil) Alisson
RB	76	(Wales) Neco Williams		(substituted off) 59'
CB	12	(England) Joe Gomez
CB	4	(Netherlands) Virgil van Dijk
LB	26	(Scotland) Andy Robertson
CM	7	(England) James Milner (c)	(yellow card) 57'	(substituted off) 59'
CM	3	(Brazil) Fabinho
CM	5	(Netherlands) Georginio Wijnaldum		(substituted off) 90+2'
RW	11	(Egypt) Mohamed Salah
CF	9	(Brazil) Roberto Firmino		(substituted off) 83'
LW	10	(Senegal) Sadio Mané
Substitutes:
GK	13	(Spain) Adrián
DF	21	(Greece) Kostas Tsimikas
DF	89	(France) Billy Koumetio
MF	8	(Guinea) Naby Keïta		(substituted on) 59'
MF	16	(Serbia) Marko Grujić
MF	17	(England) Curtis Jones		(substituted on) 83'
MF	67	(England) Harvey Elliott
FW	18	(Japan) Takumi Minamino		(substituted on) 59'
FW	24	(England) Rhian Brewster		(substituted on) 90+2'
Manager:
(Germany) Jürgen Klopp

Man of the Match:
Ainsley Maitland-Niles (Arsenal)

Assistant referees:
Mark Scholes (Berks & Bucks)
Marc Perry (Birmingham)
Fourth official:
Andrew Madley (West Riding)
Reserve assistant referee:
Dan Robathan (Norfolk)
Video assistant referee:
David Coote (Nottinghamshire)
Assistant video assistant referee:
Dan Cook (Hampshire)

Match rules

- 90 minutes
- Penalty shoot-out if scores level
- Nine named substitutes, of which six may be used
