= 2017–18 Arsenal F.C. season =

English football club season

Arsenal F.C.
2017–18 season
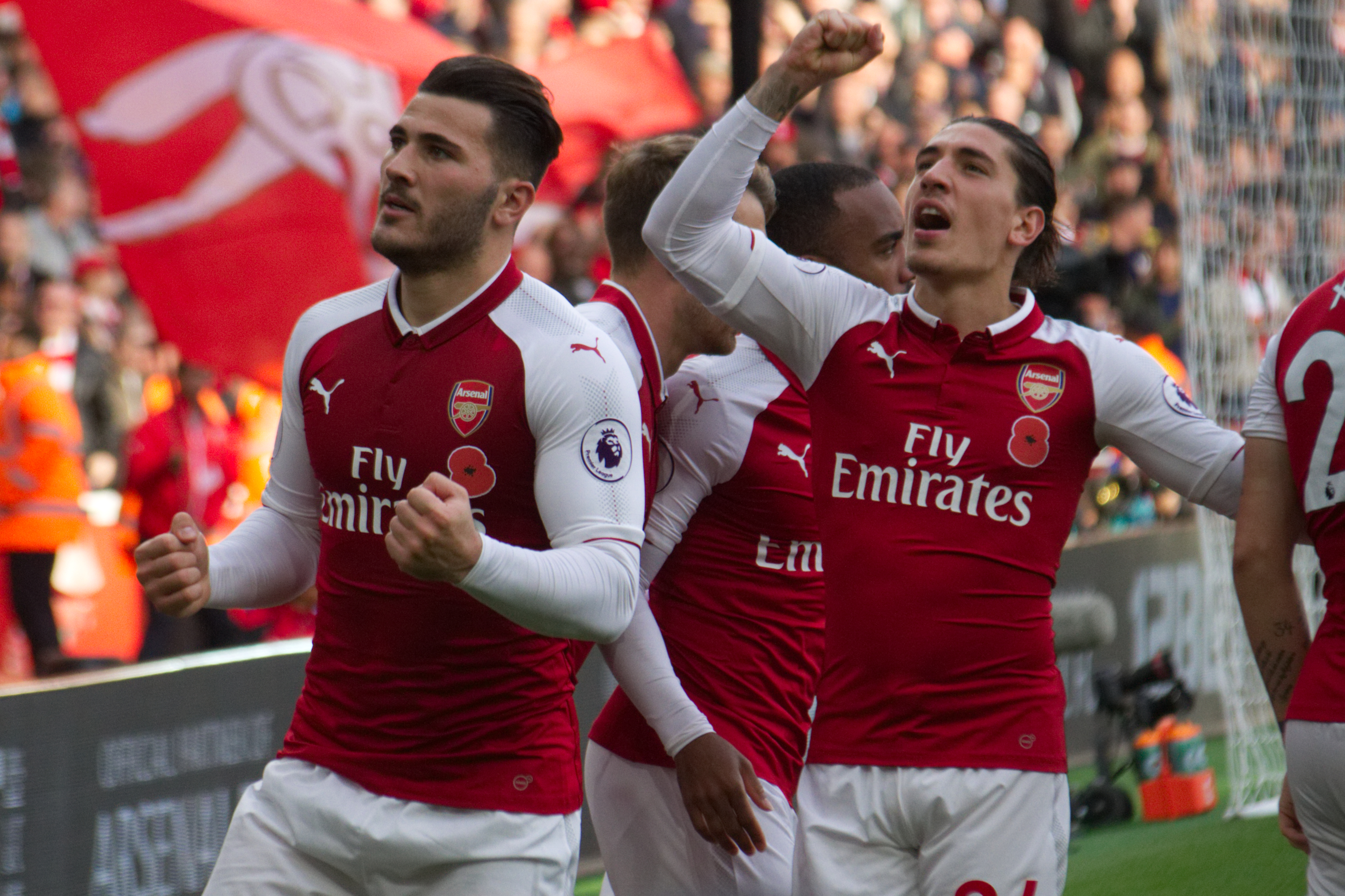
- Arsenal players Sead Kolašinac (left) and Héctor Bellerín celebrating the former's goal against Swansea City in October 2017.
- Chairman: Sir Chips Keswick
- Manager: Arsène Wenger
- Stadium: Emirates Stadium
- Premier League: 6th
- FA Community Shield: Winners
- FA Cup: Third round
- EFL Cup: Runners-up
- UEFA Europa League: Semi-finals
- Top goalscorer: League: Alexandre Lacazette (14); All: Alexandre Lacazette (17)
Home colours	Away colours	Third colours

The 2017–18 season was Arsenal's 26th in the Premier League and 92nd consecutive season in the top flight of English football. The club participated in the Premier League, the FA Cup (as holders), the EFL Cup, the FA Community Shield and the UEFA Europa League.

This was the first season that Arsenal did not participate in the UEFA Champions League since 1997–98. It was the first time they had played in the UEFA Europa League since its rebranding, having last participated in the 1999–2000 UEFA Cup. A relatively poor season saw Arsenal fail to maintain a consistent challenge for Champions League qualification, with their away form being a major factor, only winning four away games in the league all season with 11 defeats, and they were, until the final game of the season, the only team in England's top 4 divisions to not get a point away from home in the 2018 calendar year. A total of 13 defeats were recorded throughout the league campaign, the highest since the 1994–95 season, which resulted in a 6th-place finish. Furthermore, a shock 4–2 defeat at Nottingham Forest meant that Arsenal were knocked out of the FA Cup third round for the first time since 1996.

Arsenal were runners-up in the League Cup, being defeated 3–0 in the final against Manchester City. Arsenal were close to winning their first European trophy since the Cup Winners' Cup in 1994, but a 2–1 defeat on aggregate against Atlético Madrid in the semi-finals resulted in another season in the Europa League.

The season was the 21st straight and final season under manager Arsène Wenger, who announced his departure from the club on 20 April 2018. This season covered the period from 1 July 2017 to 30 June 2018.

== Background ==
Arsenal's announced their first summer signing, Sead Kolašinac, on 6 June 2017. The left-back arrived on a free transfer when his contract at Schalke 04 expired. He was joined by Alexandre Lacazette just under a month later, who joined from Lyon for a reported club-record fee of £46.5 million on 5 July. Arsenal's first January transfer window signing was Greek defender Konstantinos Mavropanos from PAS Giannina, while acquiring Armenian international Henrikh Mkhitaryan in a swap-deal with Alexis Sánchez on 22 January 2018. The club then reunited Mkhitaryan with former teammate Pierre-Emerick Aubameyang in a club-record deal worth £56.0 million on 31 January.

Arsenal released Yaya Sanogo, Stefan O'Connor, Kostas Pileas and Kristopher Da Graca on 9 June 2017. Sanogo's four-year stay only included 11 league appearances for the club, while O'Connor, Pilea and Da Graca never appeared for the first team. Academy product Chris Willock joined Benfica on June 30 upon the expiry of his contract, signing a five-year deal. Kaylen Hinds, another academy product, departed the club on 8 July, joining Wolfsburg for £2.5 million on a three-year deal. Additional reserve players Glen Kamara and Daniel Crowley also departed the club, joining Dundee and Willem II respectively. Wojciech Szczęsny, who amassed over 150 appearances for the club during an eight-year stay, joined Italian champions Juventus for £10.0 million after his two-year loan at Roma expired. Meanwhile, club mainstay Kieran Gibbs departed for West Bromwich Albion for a £7.0 million fee, leaving after recording 230 appearances over 11 seasons. On deadline day, Alex Oxlade-Chamberlain, who was in the final year of his contract at the club, transferred to Liverpool for a record sale fee of £35.0 million and Donyell Malen returned to the Netherlands to join PSV Eindhoven. In the January window, Arsenal allowed the departures of many first-team players, including Theo Walcott and Francis Coquelin, who left for combined fees of £32.0 million. Moreover, Alexis Sánchez departed to Manchester United in a swap-deal which saw Henrikh Mkhitaryan arrive at the Emirates, while also sanctioning the departures of French first-team pair Olivier Giroud and Mathieu Debuchy, while academy product Marcus McGuane joined Barcelona. All in all, 22 players departed the club.

Takuma Asano had his season-long loan at Stuttgart from the previous season extended for an additional year. Marc Bola later joined Bristol Rovers on a season-long loan. About three weeks later, Emiliano Martínez left for Getafe and Stephy Mavididi went to Preston North End. Meanwhile, English full-back pair Carl Jenkinson and Cohen Bramall were loaned to Birmingham City, while reserve player Kelechi Nwakali departed to join Eredivisie outfit VVV-Venlo. On deadline day, fringe players Lucas Pérez and Joel Campbell, who have compiled 34 domestic appearances collectively, joined Spanish outfits Deportivo La Coruña and Real Betis respectively. In January, Stephy Mavididi had his loan cut short from Preston North End and, for the second time, was then loaned out to Charlton Athletic. English duo Tafari Moore and Ben Sheaf were then loaned out to fourth-tier sides Wycombe Wanderers and Stevenage, respectively, while four additional loans were completed on deadline day. Reserve pair Julio Pleguezuelo and Krystian Bielik joined Gimnàstic Tarragona and Walsall, while fringe first-team players Chuba Akpom and Jeff Reine-Adélaïde were also loaned out to conclude Arsenal's transfers for the season.

== Review ==
=== July ===
Arsenal took a 25-man squad to play in Australia. The squad included seven under-23s, including Reiss Nelson and Joe Willock, plus both new signings Sead Kolašinac and Alexandre Lacazette. The first match was on 13 July, which was a 2–0 win over Sydney FC, where captain Per Mertesacker scored an overhead kick and Lacazette scored a debut goal after coming on as a substitute. Two days later, Arsenal faced a second Sydney side, Western Sydney Wanderers, in front of 83,000 people. Arsenal won 3–1 after first-half goals from Olivier Giroud, Aaron Ramsey and Mohamed Elneny. Arsenal then travelled to China to face Bayern Munich in Shanghai in the International Champions Cup. Alex Iwobi scored an equalizer in the dying seconds of the match, which Arsenal would win on penalties 3–2. The 25-man squad travelled up to Beijing to face Premier League rivals Chelsea. The Blues won rather convincingly, scoring three times. On 29 and 30 July, the Emirates Cup was held. Arsenal, Benfica, RB Leipzig and Sevilla all took part in the tournament, which Arsenal won after a 5–2 win over Benfica, but a 2–1 loss to Sevilla. Over the tournament, Theo Walcott was the top scorer with two goals, both against Benfica. Giroud and Iwobi also scored one each against Benfica, while Lacazette scored one against Sevilla.

=== August ===
Arsenal concluded their pre-season in the Community Shield, the traditional curtain raiser in English football. New signing Alexandre Lacazette hit the post on his competitive debut in a first half that saw Per Mertesacker replaced after a facial injury, with new signing Sead Kolašinac making his competitive debut as Mertesacker's replacement. After an end to the first half that yielded no goals, Chelsea took an early second half lead through Victor Moses, his close-range strike coming from a poorly defended corner. Several saved shots made it appear Arsenal were going to suffer defeat, until a rash challenge by Chelsea winger Pedro saw him sent off. The resulting free-kick was headed in by Kolašinac for a debut goal, and forced a penalty shootout. Arsenal were victorious 4–1 through goals by Theo Walcott, Nacho Monreal, Alex Oxlade-Chamberlain and Olivier Giroud, with Thibaut Courtois and Álvaro Morata missing penalties in the shootout that introduced the ABBA format. The result secured Arsenal's third FA Community Shield in four seasons.

Arsenal began their Premier League campaign at home to Leicester City, with the Gunners having lost their last two openers, both at home to West Ham and Liverpool. The record looked to be extended when Jamie Vardy and Shinji Okazaki scored for the Foxes after a record equaling 94th-second opener from new signing Lacazette, opening his league debut with his first competitive Arsenal goal with only his second touch of the game. Danny Welbeck drew Arsenal level in the last minute of first-half stoppage time, but Vardy scored a second ten minutes into the second half to put Leicester ahead once more. The Gunners looked set to lose their first match to the Foxes since 1994 when the final ten minutes approached, but a five-minute period of pressure yielded two goals from Aaron Ramsey and Olivier Giroud to make it 4–3, which the Gunners held on to for only their second opening day victory since 2012.

However, Arsenal's form slipped as August began to end. They suffered a 1–0 defeat against Stoke City after a poor defensive performance and a controversially disallowed goal from Alexandre Lacazette. The poor defence form continued as they were crushed 4–0 by Liverpool and failed to register a single shot on target, sending them near the relegation zone, despite the returns of suspended defender Laurent Koscielny and injured forward Alexis Sánchez.

=== September ===
Arsenal began September with a 3–0 win over Bournemouth at home in the Premier League. Danny Welbeck scored either side of Alexandre Lacazette for an emphatic win. Five days on the Gunners would play in the Europa League having failed to secure a place for the usual Champions League. They played at home to German minnows FC Cologne and horrendously conceded a 40-yard goal as an unfortunate consequence of a mistake by second choice goalkeeper David Ospina thus were booed off the pitch at half time. However, Arsenal responded in the second half. Sead Kolašinac volleyed in the equaliser then Alexis Sánchez scored to give the Gunners the lead and Héctor Bellerín added a third as the match ended 3–1 in Arsenal's favor. Moreover, the match saw Jack Wilshere return for his first Gunners appearance in over a year. On 17 September Arsenal resumed the Premier League campaign as they played against champions Chelsea at Stamford Bridge. The match ended 0–0 despite Aaron Ramsey hitting the post and Chelsea defender David Luiz being sent off on 87 minutes. Three days later Arsenal played in the League Cup third round against League One team Doncaster Rovers at the Emirates. Theo Walcott scored the only goal of the match to send the Gunners into the fourth round but it was an unconvincing performance by Arsenal as they only managed a 1–0 win over a third-tier team. On 25 September Arsenal were at home to West Bromwich Albion in the Premier League. The Gunners won 2–0 with Lacazette scoring both goals. To end September Arsenal played the second Europa League match of this season. They took the trip to Belarus and won 4–2 against BATE Borisov. Walcott scored two before a first Arsenal goal for Rob Holding as well as Olivier Giroud's 100th goal for Arsenal as the Gunners took those three points to England.

=== October ===
On the 1st of October, the Gunners played the 7th league match of the season against newly promoted Brighton & Hove Albion at the Emirates. Arsenal won the match 2–0 thanks to goals by Nacho Monreal and Alex Iwobi. Two weeks on following an international break the Gunners were away to Watford. Captain Per Mertesacker gave the Gunners a first-half lead but Watford went on to win 2–1: during the second half Troy Deeney converted a penalty which was controversially given by referee Neil Swarbrick. Then in stoppage time former Manchester United and Everton player Tom Cleverley gave Watford the win. On 19 October Arsenal made the trip to Serbia for the third Europa League match against Red Star Belgrade. The Gunners won 1–0 with Olivier Giroud scoring an exceptional overhead kick. Three days sooner Arsenal went to Goodison Park to face struggling Everton. During the first half the out-of-form Toffees took the lead through a shot by Wayne Rooney just outside the 18-yard box but Arsenal equalised with Monreal's rebounded shot five minutes before the break. In the second half Mesut Özil got his first goal of the season, heading home Alexis Sánchez's cross. Then 15 minutes later Everton's Idrissa Gueye was sent off for two yellow cards, which proved to set up the Merseyside team's capitulation as goals by Alexandre Lacazette and Aaron Ramsey put Arsenal 4–1 up. In stoppage time Oumar Niasse scored to give Everton hope following a mistake by Petr Čech who failed to control a tame back pass by Monreal. But then Sánchez scored the fifth goal for Arsenal in the final minute of stoppage time as the match ended 5–2 to the Gunners. Only two days later Arsenal played in the League Cup fourth round at home to Championship team Norwich City. During the first half Norwich grabbed a shock 1–0 lead as the Gunners were booed off on the half time whistle. However, on 85 minutes youngster Eddie Nketiah went off the bench to score an equalizer for Arsenal — his first goal on his home debut — as the match went to extra time where Nketiah scored once more for Arsenal, heading in a set piece delivery to put them 2–1 up. The match ultimately ended 2–1 to take the Gunners into the fifth round. The final match of this October was in the Premier League at home to Swansea City. The Gunners were embarrassed to be 1–0 down at half time for a second consecutive home match but they went on to win 2–1 with goals by Sead Kolašinac and Ramsey to keep the three points in Arsenal's favor.

=== November ===
The Gunners played the fourth Europa League match at home to Red Star Belgrade on 2 November but they lacked a cutting edge as they drew 0–0. Next they faced league leaders Manchester City at the Etihad Stadium in the Premier League. The Gunners were outplayed from the beginning to end: Kevin De Bruyne handed City the lead and a controversial penalty by Sergio Agüero put them 2–0 up. Sub Alexandre Lacazette gave Arsenal a glimmer of hope but then Gabriel Jesus scored a third Manchester City goal to end the match 3–1 to City. On 18 November following the international break, it was North London derby day in the league as the Gunners played at home to Tottenham. Arsenal won the match 2–0 with first half goals by Shkodran Mustafi and Alexis Sánchez to give the Gunners' first win over Tottenham in the league since 2014. Five days on Arsenal took the trip to Germany as they played the fifth match of the Europa League schedule against Cologne but despite the Gunners' heavy momentum on the back of the North London derby win they suffered a humiliating 1–0 defeat by the Bundesliga bottom team. Three days sooner Arsenal were away to Burnley in the league. Only a stoppage time penalty by Alexis Sánchez would give the Gunners the lead as the match ended 1–0 to Arsenal. The final match of November would see them play newly promoted Huddersfield at home in the Premier League. Mesut Özil produced a dazzling performance as Arsenal won 5–0 with Alexandre Lacazette scoring the opener, Olivier Giroud scoring the second and fifth, Sánchez scoring the third and Özil himself scoring the fourth. The big win meant that Arsenal would have huge momentum going into the next Premier League match to be played in December — a big one at home to Manchester United.

=== December ===
Unfortunately, Arsenal ended up losing 3–1 to Manchester United. Antonio Valencia gave the visitors an early 4th-minute lead then, only 7 minutes later, Jesse Lingard made it 2–0. The Gunners tried to take a goal back before half-time as they dominated much of the first half but United goalkeeper David de Gea produced an outstanding performance to stop them doing this. Alexandre Lacazette hit the bar and just before the break De Gea made a point-blank save to prevent United conceding an own goal. During the second half on 49 minutes the Gunners finally got a goal back as Lacazette made it 2–1 but then, with 27 minutes remaining, Lingard scored a third for United as the Arsenal defense was exposed during a United counterattack. In the 74th minute, Paul Pogba was sent off for a rash challenge but it never proved to change the match as Manchester United won 3–1 and took the three points to Manchester. On 7 December Arsenal bounced back as they hammered BATE Borisov 6–0 in the final Europa League group stage match with goals by Mathieu Debuchy, Theo Walcott, Jack Wilshere, Olivier Giroud and Mohamed Elneny as well as an own goal by one of the BATE Borisov players. The Gunners topped the group and would go on to face Swedish team Östersund in the round of 32 of the Europa League which would be held in February. On 10 December Arsenal went to the South Coast to face Southampton in the league but could only manage a 1–1 draw. Three days later the Gunners faced West Ham United away from home in the Premier League but the match yielded no goals. Three more days later the Gunners played against Newcastle United at the Emirates in a third consecutive Premier League match. The match ended 1–0 to Arsenal with Mesut Özil scoring a stunning volley. On 19 December the Gunners played in the fifth round of the League Cup against West Ham at home. Danny Welbeck scored the only goal of the match to send the Gunners into the semi-finals. On 22 December, three days before Christmas, Arsenal faced Liverpool at the Emirates in the Premier League. Philippe Coutinho gave the visitors a first half lead then, 7 minutes into the second half, Mohamed Salah made it 2–0 to Liverpool. However, Arsenal responded in quick fashion as they scored three goals in five minutes. Goals by Alexis Sánchez, Granit Xhaka and Özil turned the match round as they led 3–2 but then on 71 minutes Roberto Firmino scored a third Liverpool goal to equalise. No further goals occurred as the match ended 3–3 with some describing it as the match of the season. On 28 December the Gunners were away to Crystal Palace in the league and earned a hard-fought 3–2 win with Shkodran Mustafi scoring the opener and Sánchez scoring a brace. Arsenal's final match of 2017 was in the Premier League at West Brom. Baggies midfielder James McClean deflected Sánchez's free kick into his own net to give the Gunners a 1–0 lead on 83 minutes but then Arsenal conceded an 89th-minute penalty which was controversially and wrongly given by referee Mike Dean as the match concluded as a 1–1 draw. 2017 ended in disappointment for the Gunners.

=== January ===
The Gunners' first match of the year saw them play at home to Chelsea in the league. The match yielded no goals during the first half but the deadlock was broken by Arsenal 27 minutes before the end. Jack Wilshere put the Gunners into the lead but it lasted only four minutes and Chelsea turned the game round: Eden Hazard scored a penalty and on 84 minutes Marcos Alonso made it 2–1 to Chelsea. It seemed that it was determined for Chelsea to go on and win the match but then in the second minute of stoppage time Arsenal grabbed a late equalizer through Héctor Bellerín. In the dying moments Chelsea nearly bagged a winning goal but Davide Zappacosta hit the woodwork. The match ended 2–2. On 7 January the Gunners began the FA Cup campaign and played in the third round against Nottingham Forest who were troubled and had no manager. Arsenal who were the defending champions of the competition were expected to win this tie comfortably against a team whom they hammered in the League Cup last season but it turned out that the match was a giant killing: Arsenal were humiliated 4–2 by the Championship team and were knocked out of the FA Cup third round for the first time under Arsène Wenger. Three days later the Gunners played in the League Cup semi final first leg against Chelsea at Stamford Bridge. The match was dull and below par and no goals occurred. On 14 January Arsenal resumed the Premier League campaign at Bournemouth. Bellerín gave the Gunners the lead on 52 minutes but Bournemouth went on to win 2–1: a mistake by Petr Čech enabled former Liverpool player Jordon Ibe to equalize in the 70th minute and only four minutes later Callum Wilson struck the winner. On 20 January the Gunners played the next Premier League match at home to Crystal Palace and won 4–1 with first half goals by Nacho Monreal, Alex Iwobi, Laurent Koscielny and Alexandre Lacazette. Four days on Arsenal faced Chelsea at the Emirates in the second leg of the League Cup semi final. During the first half Eden Hazard gave the visitors the lead but the Gunners equalized with Chelsea defender Antonio Rüdiger diverting Monreal's effort into his own net. Twenty minutes into the second half Granit Xhaka put Arsenal in front and they went on to win 2–1 thus sending the Gunners into the final of the League Cup where they would face Manchester City. On 30 January Arsenal's optimism and enthusiasm were dampened suffering a shock 3–1 defeat at Swansea City in the Premier League – a match which involved a second mistake by Petr Čech of the month. The Czech goalkeeper had failed to keep a clean sheet in seven league matches and was aiming to earn his 200th in the Premier League.

=== February ===
On 3 February the Gunners played in the Premier League at home to Everton — a match where Arsenal handed home debuts and first starts for January signings Henrikh Mkhitaryan and Pierre-Emerick Aubameyang, both of whom played together previously for Borussia Dortmund. Arsenal won the match 5–1 with Mkhitaryan bagging three assists, Aaron Ramsey scoring a hat-trick and Aubameyang scoring one. It felt like a new beginning for Arsenal with those new signings — and Mesut Özil's new contract — but it never seemed to be different on 9 February: the Gunners faced Tottenham at Wembley in a Premier League North London derby and lost 1–0 thanks to a goal by Harry Kane. Five days on Arsenal would play the first leg of the Europa League round of 32 at Swedish team Östersund where the Gunners prevailed 3–0. The next Arsenal match would be the second leg of the round at the Emirates where Östersund rallied scoring two goals in the first half. One more goal would even the tie but then in the second half Sead Kolašinac sent the Gunners back into the comfort zone making it 4–2 on aggregate. Arsenal progressed into the next round of the Europa League despite the shock 2–1 home defeat by the Swedish underdogs. On 25 February Arsenal returned to Wembley where they would face Manchester City in the League Cup final. The Gunners were horrendously outplayed by the runaway Premier League leaders and lost 3–0. Sergio Agüero handed Manchester City the lead following a big Arsenal defensive error. On 58 minutes skipper Vincent Kompany made it 2–0 to City and David Silva added a third. Following the Arsenal humiliation former Gunner Ian Wright said that it was 'an insipid performance' by Arsenal.

=== March ===
On 1 March Arsenal resumed the Premier League campaign by playing at home to Manchester City. The Gunners failed to avenge the League Cup final defeat and they were beaten 3–0 with first half goals by Bernardo Silva, David Silva and Leroy Sané while Pierre-Emerick Aubameyang missed a penalty in the second half. This Arsenal defeat would send City nearer to title triumph and would only inflict more misery on the Gunners and Arsène Wenger. It only got worse for them on 4 March where the Gunners lost 2–1 at Brighton in the Premier League further increasing the pressure on Wenger. However, on 8 March the Gunners responded in the Europa League first leg match where they won 2–0 against A.C. Milan in Italy and three days on they would win 3–0 at home to Watford thanks to goals by Shkodran Mustafi, Aubameyang and Henrikh Mkhitaryan. It was also the match where Petr Čech finally kept his 200th Premier League clean sheet and he had to save Troy Deeney's penalty to ensure this. The Gunners' final match of March was the second leg of the Europa League round at the Emirates. Milan took the lead on 35 minutes but Arsenal went on to win 3–1 with goals by Danny Welbeck and Granit Xhaka with the former scoring a brace. The Gunners won the tie 5–1 on aggregate thus taking them into the quarter-finals of the Europa League.

=== April ===
Arsenal's next league encounter was on 1 April 2018, at home to a struggling Stoke City side seemingly bound for relegation. It took Arsenal 75 minutes to break the deadlock, achieved via Pierre–Emerick Aubameyang's penalty, before his terrific volley made it 2–0 in Arsenal's favor with four minutes remaining. Aubameyang then had the chance to complete his hat–trick with another spot–kick awarded at the death, but Aubameyang permitted Alexandre Lacazette to take, and he duly did as Arsenal ultimately won 3–0.

In the next match, Arsenal played host to Russians CSKA Moscow in the first leg of their UEFA Europa League quarter–final. After going ahead via Aaron Ramsey, CSKA levelled via Aleksandr Golovin's stunning free kick. Lacazette then netted from the spot before one of the goals of the year from Aaron Ramsey, an ingenious back–heeled volley, coupled with Lacazette's second later in the half, sealed a commanding 4–1 first leg triumph.

In their fifth successive home match in all competitions, Arsenal secured a dramatic 3–2 home win over Southampton. After Irishman Shane Long put the Saints ahead, goals from Aubameyang and Welbeck made it 2–1 to the hosts. However, Charlie Austin's equalizer tier up a grand finale, decided via Welbeck's second of the evening on 81 minutes.

Arsenal then progressed to the semi–finals of the Europa League as late goals from Welbeck and Ramsey saw Arsenal overcome a 2–0 deficit and earn a 2–2 draw in the Russian capital, subsequently winning the tie 6–3 on aggregate.

However, despite the recent upturn in results, goals from Ayoze Perez and Matt Ritchie saw Lacazette's early goal rendered worthless at St James Park, with Newcastle United recording a 2–1 victory.

With the pressure mounting, Arsène Wenger's departure as Arsenal boss was announced, so ending a 22-year, trophy–laden association with the club. He would take charge for the remainder of the season prior to the announcement of the new boss.

Against West Ham next time hour, Nacho Monreal had his 52nd-minute strike cancelled out by Marko Arnautović, before Ramsey restores Arsenal's lead late on. A brace later from Lacazette saw Arsenal ultimately secure a 4–1 win and duly keep alive their top four hopes.

However, a damaging 1–1 home draw with Spanish club Atlético Madrid saw Arsenal on the back foot following the first leg of the Europa League semi–final. Despite leading against ten men through Alexandre Lacazette's header, Antoine Griezmann pegged back the Gunners late on.

Things worsened next time out, as, despite Henrikh Mkhitaryan scoring on his return to Old Trafford, goals in either half from Paul Pogba and Marouane Fellaini saw Manchester United earn a 2–1 victory over the struggling Gunners.

=== May ===
Things got worse later in the week, as Diego Costa's first–half strike earned Atlético Madrid a 1–0 win at the Wanda Metropolitano and eliminate Arsenal from the tournament, ending Arsène Wenger's last chance of winning a trophy in his final season at Arsenal.

However, his last home match in charge at least ended positively, with a 5–0 annihilation of Burnley. Pierre–Emerick Aubameyang opened and closed the scoring, with Lacazette, Sead Kolašinac and Alex Iwobi all scoring one goal each.

His penultimate game at the helm ended in a disappointing 3–1 defeat at Leicester City, despite Aubameyang levelling for the ten-man Gunners shortly before the break.

Arsène Wenger's tenure as Arsenal manager ended as it began all the way back in 1996; with an away win and clean sheet. Huddersfield Town was the Frenchman's final opponents, with Aubameyang grabbing his tenth of the season in the 36th minute to seal a 1–0 victory.

== Pre-season ==
Win Draw Loss

On 9 May 2017, Arsenal announced they would travel to Australia as part of their pre-season schedule and play two matches against Sydney FC and Western Sydney Wanderers. The club also faced Bayern Munich in Shanghai as a part of the International Champions Cup, and Chelsea in Beijing. Arsenal then hosted the 2017 Emirates Cup, and played Benfica and Sevilla as part of the tournament.

=== Friendlies ===
13 July 2017	Sydney FC	0–2	Arsenal	Sydney, Australia
20:00 AEST (UTC+10); 11:00 BST (UTC+1)		Report	Mertesacker 4'; Lacazette 83'	Stadium: ANZ Stadium; Attendance: 80,432; Referee: Shaun Evans (Australia)

15 July 2017	Western Sydney Wanderers	1–3	Arsenal	Sydney, Australia
20:00 AEST (UTC+10); 11:00 BST (UTC+1)	Lustica 57'	Report	Giroud 33'; Ramsey 37'; Elneny 44'	Stadium: ANZ Stadium; Attendance: 83,221; Referee: Jarred Gillett (Australia)

=== International Champions Cup ===
19 July 2017 2017 ICC (Asia)	Bayern Munich	1–1 (2–3 p)	Arsenal	Shanghai, China
19:20 CST (UTC+8); 12:20 BST (UTC+1)	Lewandowski 9' (pen.); Martínez (yellow card) 22'	Report	Coquelin (yellow card) 19'; Elneny (yellow card) 58'; Willock (yellow card) 84'; Iwobi 90+4'	Stadium: Shanghai Stadium, Shanghai; Attendance: 39,208; Referee: Guan Xing (China)
	Penalties
	Alaba (penalty missed); Hummels (penalty scored); Coman (penalty scored); Sanches (penalty missed); Bernat (penalty missed)		(penalty scored) Ramsey; (penalty missed) Elneny; (penalty scored) Monreal; (penalty scored) Iwobi
Note: The match was part of the 2017 Audi Football Summit and the 2017 Audi Summer Tour.

=== FAW Toyota Exhibition ===
22 July 2017	Arsenal	0–3	Chelsea	Beijing, China
19:40 CST (UTC+8); 12:40 BST (UTC+1)	Kolašinac (yellow card) 75'	Report	Willian 40'; Batshuayi 42', 49'	Stadium: Beijing National Stadium (the Bird's Nest); Attendance: 55,618; Referee: Fu Ming (China)

=== Emirates Cup ===
29 July 2017	Arsenal	5–2	Benfica	London, England
16:20 BST (UTC+1)	Walcott 25', 33'; López 52' (o.g.); Giroud 64'; Iwobi 71'	Report	Cervi 12'; Eliseu (yellow card) 28'; Salvio 40'	Stadium: Emirates Stadium; Attendance: 54,538; Referee: Anthony Taylor (England)

30 July 2017	Arsenal	1–2	Sevilla	London, England
16:20 BST (UTC+1)	Lacazette 62'	Report	Escudero (yellow card) 43'; Correa 49'; Nzonzi 69'; Krohn-Dehli (yellow card) 87'	Stadium: Emirates Stadium; Attendance: 57,968; Referee: Andre Marriner (England)

== Competitions ==
=== Community Shield ===
6 August 2017 Final	Arsenal	1–1 (4–1 p)	Chelsea	Wembley, London
14:00 BST	Bellerín (yellow card) 15'; Kolašinac 82'	Report	Azpilicueta (yellow card) 13'; Alonso (yellow card) 35'; Willian (yellow card) 37'; Moses 46'; Pedro (red card) 80'	Stadium: Wembley Stadium; Attendance: 83,325; Referee: Bobby Madley
	Penalties
	Walcott (penalty scored); Monreal (penalty scored); Oxlade-Chamberlain (penalty scored); Giroud (penalty scored)		(penalty scored) Cahill; (penalty missed) Courtois; (penalty missed) Morata

=== Premier League ===
==== League table ====
Pos	Team	Pld	W	D	L	GF	GA	GD	Pts	Qualification or relegation
4	Liverpool	38	21	12	5	84	38	+46	75	Qualification for the Champions League group stage
5	Chelsea	38	21	7	10	62	38	+24	70	Qualification for the Europa League group stage (Note: Since the winners of the 2017–18 FA Cup (Chelsea) and the winners of the 2017–18 EFL Cup (Manchester City) both qualified for European competition based on their league positions, the berths awarded to the 5th-placed team (Europa League group stage) and the League Cup winners (Europa League second qualifying round) were passed down the league.)
6	Arsenal	38	19	6	13	74	51	+23	63	Qualification for the Europa League group stage
7	Burnley	38	14	12	12	36	39	−3	54	Qualification for the Europa League second qualifying round
8	Everton	38	13	10	15	44	58	−14	49	

Source: Premier League
Rules for classification: 1) Points; 2) Goal difference; 3) Goals scored. 4) Play-offs (only if needed to decide champion, teams for relegation or teams for UEFA competitions).

==== Results summary ====
Overall								Home						Away					
Pld	W	D	L	GF	GA	GD	Pts	W	D	L	GF	GA	GD	W	D	L	GF	GA	GD
38	19	6	13	74	51	+23	63	15	2	2	54	20	+34	4	4	11	20	31	−11

Last updated: 13 May 2018.
Source: Premier League

==== Results by matchday ====
Round	1	2	3	4	5	6	7	8	9	10	11	12	13	14	15	16	17	18	19	20	21	22	23	24	25	26	27	28	29	30	31	32	33	34	35	36	37	38
Ground	H	A	A	H	A	H	H	A	A	H	A	H	A	H	H	A	A	H	H	A	A	H	A	H	A	H	A	H	A	H	H	H	A	H	A	H	A	A
Result	W	L	L	W	D	W	W	L	W	W	L	W	W	W	L	D	D	W	D	W	D	D	L	W	L	W	L	L	L	W	W	W	L	W	L	W	L	W
Position	5	11	16	11	12	7	5	6	5	5	6	6	4	4	5	5	7	4	6	6	6	6	6	6	6	6	6	6	6	6	6	6	6	6	6	6	6	6
Points	3	3	3	6	7	10	13	13	16	19	19	22	25	28	28	29	30	33	34	37	38	39	39	42	42	45	45	45	45	48	51	54	54	57	57	60	60	63

Updated to match(es) played on 13 May 2018. Source: 11v11.com
A = Away; H = Home; W = Win; D = Draw; L = Loss

==== Matches ====
On 14 June 2017, Arsenal's Premier League fixtures were announced, with the first game scheduled at home to Leicester City, and be the sixth season running Arsenal would start their league campaign at home. Also, Arsenal would play in the first Premier League match of the season.

11 August 2017 1	Arsenal	4–3	Leicester City	Holloway, London
19:45 BST	Lacazette 2'; Welbeck 45+2'; Ramsey 83'; Giroud 85'	Report	Okazaki 5'; Vardy 29', 56'; Morgan (yellow card) 90+4'	Stadium: Emirates Stadium; Attendance: 59,387; Referee: Mike Dean

19 August 2017 2	Stoke City	1–0	Arsenal	Stoke-on-Trent
17:30 BST	Jesé 47'	Report		Stadium: bet365 Stadium; Attendance: 29,459; Referee: Andre Marriner

27 August 2017 3	Liverpool	4–0	Arsenal	Liverpool
16:00 BST	Firmino 17'; Lovren (yellow card) 20'; Gomez (yellow card) 23'; Mané 40'; Salah 57'; Sturridge 77'	Report	Welbeck (yellow card) 22'; Xhaka (yellow card) 40'; Özil (yellow card) 49'; Holding (yellow card) 73'	Stadium: Anfield; Attendance: 53,206; Referee: Craig Pawson

9 September 2017 4	Arsenal	3–0	Bournemouth	Holloway, London
15:00 BST	Welbeck 6', 50'; Lacazette 27'	Report	Francis (yellow card) 76'	Stadium: Emirates Stadium; Attendance: 59,262; Referee: Anthony Taylor

17 September 2017 5	Chelsea	0–0	Arsenal	Fulham, London
13:30 BST	Morata (yellow card) 65'; David Luiz (red card) 87'	Report	Elneny (yellow card) 84'; Kolašinac (yellow card) 90+1'; Bellerín (yellow card) 90+3'	Stadium: Stamford Bridge; Attendance: 41,478; Referee: Michael Oliver

25 September 2017 6	Arsenal	2–0	West Bromwich Albion	Holloway, London
20:00 BST	Lacazette 20', 67' (pen.); Sánchez (yellow card) 44'	Report	Evans (yellow card) 35'; Dawson (yellow card) 49'; Krychowiak (yellow card) 56'; Nyom (yellow card) 67'	Stadium: Emirates Stadium; Attendance: 59,134; Referee: Robert Madley

1 October 2017 7	Arsenal	2–0	Brighton & Hove Albion	Holloway, London
12:00 BST	Monreal 16'; Iwobi 56'	Report	Groß (yellow card) 17'; Duffy (yellow card) 39'	Stadium: Emirates Stadium; Attendance: 59,378; Referee: Kevin Friend

14 October 2017 8	Watford	2–1	Arsenal	Watford
17:30 BST	Kabasele (yellow card) 64'; Deeney 71' (pen.); Cleverley 90+2'	Report	Mertesacker 39'	Stadium: Vicarage Road; Attendance: 20,384; Referee: Neil Swarbrick

22 October 2017 9	Everton	2–5	Arsenal	Liverpool
13:30 BST	Rooney 12'; Williams (yellow card) 16'; Gueye (yellow card) 34' (yellow-red card) 68'; Niasse 90+3'	Report	Monreal 40'; Özil 53'; Lacazette 74'; Koscielny (yellow card) 86'; Ramsey 90'; Sánchez 90+5'	Stadium: Goodison Park; Attendance: 39,189; Referee: Craig Pawson

28 October 2017 10	Arsenal	2–1	Swansea City	Holloway, London
15:00 BST	Kolašinac 51'; Ramsey 58'	Report	Clucas 22'	Stadium: Emirates Stadium; Attendance: 59,493; Referee: Lee Mason

5 November 2017 11	Manchester City	3–1	Arsenal	Manchester
14:15 GMT	De Bruyne 19'; Agüero 50' (pen.); Otamendi (yellow card) 73'; Gabriel Jesus 74'	Report	Monreal (yellow card) 49'; Lacazette (yellow card) 59', (goal) 65'; Koscielny (yellow card) 67'; Xhaka (yellow card) 75'; Sánchez (yellow card) 77'; Özil (yellow card) 90+1'	Stadium: Etihad Stadium; Attendance: 54,286; Referee: Michael Oliver

18 November 2017 12	Arsenal	2–0	Tottenham Hotspur	Holloway, London
12:30 GMT	Xhaka (yellow card) 32'; Mustafi 36', (yellow card) 48'; Sánchez (yellow card) 38', (goal) 41'; Monreal (yellow card) 73'	Report	Kane (yellow card) 50'	Stadium: Emirates Stadium; Attendance: 59,530; Referee: Mike Dean

26 November 2017 13	Burnley	0–1	Arsenal	Burnley
14:00 GMT	Defour (yellow card) 15'; Brady (yellow card) 25'	Report	Sánchez 90+2' (pen.)	Stadium: Turf Moor; Attendance: 21,722; Referee: Lee Mason

29 November 2017 14	Arsenal	5–0	Huddersfield Town	Holloway, London
19:45 GMT	Lacazette 3'; Giroud 68', 87'; Sánchez 69'; Özil 72'	Report	Mooy (yellow card) 60'	Stadium: Emirates Stadium; Attendance: 59,285; Referee: Graham Scott

2 December 2017 15	Arsenal	1–3	Manchester United	Holloway, London
17:30 GMT	Lacazette 49'; Bellerín (yellow card) 72'; Koscielny (yellow card) 87'; Sánchez (yellow card) 89'	Report	Valencia 4'; Lingard 11', 63'; Rojo (yellow card) 58'; Pogba (red card) 74'; Herrera (yellow card) 89'	Stadium: Emirates Stadium; Attendance: 59,547; Referee: Andre Marriner

10 December 2017 16	Southampton	1–1	Arsenal	Southampton
12:00 GMT	Austin 3'; Stephens (yellow card) 82'; Romeu (yellow card) 84'	Report	Bellerín (yellow card) 78'; Giroud 88'; Wilshere (yellow card) 90'	Stadium: St Mary's Stadium; Attendance: 31,643; Referee: Bobby Madley

13 December 2017 17	West Ham United	0–0	Arsenal	Stratford, London
20:00 GMT	Lanzini (yellow card) 41'; Reid (yellow card) 90+2'	Report		Stadium: London Stadium; Attendance: 56,921; Referee: Jonathan Moss

16 December 2017 18	Arsenal	1–0	Newcastle United	Holloway, London
15:00 GMT	Özil 23'; Monreal (yellow card) 86'; Xhaka (yellow card) 90+2'	Report	Hayden (yellow card) 40'	Stadium: Emirates Stadium; Attendance: 59,379; Referee: Stuart Attwell

22 December 2017 19	Arsenal	3–3	Liverpool	Holloway, London
19:45 GMT	Sánchez 53'; Xhaka 56'; Özil 58'; Iwobi (yellow card) 58'	Report	Coutinho 26'; Salah 52'; Firmino 71'	Stadium: Emirates Stadium; Attendance: 59,409; Referee: Martin Atkinson

28 December 2017 20	Crystal Palace	2–3	Arsenal	Selhurst, London
20:00 GMT	Zaha (yellow card) 45+2'; Townsend 49'; Tomkins 89'	Report	Mustafi 25'; Chambers (yellow card) 29'; Sánchez 62', 66'	Stadium: Selhurst Park; Attendance: 25,762; Referee: Michael Oliver

31 December 2017 21	West Bromwich Albion	1–1	Arsenal	West Bromwich
16:30 GMT	Evans (yellow card) 34'; Brunt (yellow card) 59'; Dawson (yellow card) 82'; Rodriguez 89' (pen.)	Report	Mustafi (yellow card) 58'; McClean 83' (o.g.); Wilshere (yellow card) 88'; Čech (yellow card) 90+5'	Stadium: The Hawthorns; Attendance: 26,223; Referee: Mike Dean

3 January 2018 22	Arsenal	2–2	Chelsea	Holloway, London
19:45 GMT	Wilshere (yellow card) 31', (goal) 63'; Holding (yellow card) 53'; Özil (yellow card) 67'; Bellerín 90+2'	Report	Fàbregas (yellow card) 43'; Hazard 67' (pen.); Alonso 84'; Courtois (yellow card) 89'	Stadium: Emirates Stadium; Attendance: 59,379; Referee: Anthony Taylor

14 January 2018 23	Bournemouth	2–1	Arsenal	Boscombe
13:30 GMT	Gosling (yellow card) 21'; Francis (yellow card) 31'; Wilson 70'; Ibe 74'	Report	Bellerín 52'; Xhaka (yellow card) 56'; Wilshere (yellow card) 71'	Stadium: Vitality Stadium; Attendance: 10,836; Referee: Kevin Friend

20 January 2018 24	Arsenal	4–1	Crystal Palace	Holloway, London
15:00 GMT	Monreal 6'; Iwobi 10'; Koscielny 13'; Lacazette 22'	Report	Milivojević 78'	Stadium: Emirates Stadium; Attendance: 59,386; Referee: Chris Kavanagh

30 January 2018 25	Swansea City	3–1	Arsenal	Swansea
19:45 GMT	Clucas 34', 86'; Ayew 61'	Report	Monreal 33'; Elneny (yellow card) 54'; Bellerín (yellow card) 69'; Özil (yellow card) 75'	Stadium: Liberty Stadium; Attendance: 20,819; Referee: Lee Mason

3 February 2018 26	Arsenal	5–1	Everton	Holloway, London
17:30 GMT	Ramsey 6', 19', 74'; Koscielny 14', (yellow card) 24'; Aubameyang 37'; Mustafi (yellow card) 50'	Report	Calvert-Lewin 64'	Stadium: Emirates Stadium; Attendance: 59,306; Referee: Neil Swarbrick

10 February 2018 27	Tottenham Hotspur	1–0	Arsenal	Wembley, London
12:30 GMT	Kane 49'; Lamela (yellow card) 79'; Dier (yellow card) 90+5'	Report	Mustafi (yellow card) 73'	Stadium: Wembley Stadium; Attendance: 83,222; Referee: Anthony Taylor

1 March 2018 28	Arsenal	0–3	Manchester City	Holloway, London
19:45 GMT	Kolašinac (yellow card) 32'	Report	B. Silva 15'; Otamendi (yellow card) 19'; D. Silva 28'; Sané 33'	Stadium: Emirates Stadium; Attendance: 58,420; Referee: Andre Marriner

4 March 2018 29	Brighton & Hove Albion	2–1	Arsenal	Falmer
13:30 GMT	Dunk 7'; Murray 26', (yellow card) 78'; Stephens (yellow card) 60'; Schelotto (yellow card) 64'	Report	Kolašinac (yellow card) 28'; Wilshere (yellow card) 40'; Aubameyang 43'; Xhaka (yellow card) 54'	Stadium: AMEX Stadium; Attendance: 30,620; Referee: Stuart Attwell

11 March 2018 30	Arsenal	3–0	Watford	Holloway, London
13:30 GMT	Mustafi 8', (yellow card) 55'; Aubameyang 59'; Mkhitaryan 77'; Xhaka (yellow card) 90'	Report	Holebas (yellow card) 66'	Stadium: Emirates Stadium; Attendance: 59,131; Referee: Martin Atkinson

1 April 2018 31	Arsenal	3–0	Stoke City	Holloway, London
13:30 BST	Elneny (yellow card) 37'; Aubameyang 75' (pen.), 86'; Lacazette 89' (pen.)	Report	Johnson (yellow card) 66'; Allen (yellow card) 90'	Stadium: Emirates Stadium; Attendance: 59,371; Referee: Craig Pawson

8 April 2018 32	Arsenal	3–2	Southampton	Holloway, London
14:15 BST	Aubameyang 28'; Welbeck 38', 81'; Bellerín (yellow card) 50'; Wilshere (yellow card) 90+2'; Elneny (red card) 90+3'	Report	Long 17'; Austin 73'; Stephens (red card) 90+2'; Hoedt (yellow card) 90+6'	Stadium: Emirates Stadium; Attendance: 59,374; Referee: Andre Marriner

15 April 2018 33	Newcastle United	2–1	Arsenal	Newcastle upon Tyne
13:30 BST	Pérez 29'; Ritchie 68'; Slimani (yellow card) 90+1'	Report	Lacazette 14'	Stadium: St James' Park; Attendance: 52,210; Referee: Anthony Taylor

22 April 2018 34	Arsenal	4–1	West Ham United	Holloway, London
13:30 BST	Xhaka (yellow card) 41'; Monreal 51'; Maitland-Niles (yellow card) 62'; Mustafi (yellow card) 74'; Ramsey 82'; Lacazette 85', 89'	Report	Zabaleta (yellow card) 50'; Arnautović 64'	Stadium: Emirates Stadium; Attendance: 59,422; Referee: Lee Mason

29 April 2018 35	Manchester United	2–1	Arsenal	Manchester
16:30 BST	Pogba 16'; Fellaini 90+1'	Report	Xhaka (yellow card) 24'; Mkhitaryan 51'	Stadium: Old Trafford; Attendance: 75,035; Referee: Kevin Friend

6 May 2018 36	Arsenal	5–0	Burnley	Holloway, London
16:30 BST	Aubameyang 14', 75'; Lacazette 45+3'; Kolašinac 54'; Iwobi 64'	Report	Tarkowski (yellow card) 44'	Stadium: Emirates Stadium; Attendance: 59,540; Referee: Andre Marriner
Note: As the last home game of the season, the match was also part of Arsène Wenger's farewell ceremony ('Merci Arsène'). The match was also Per Mertesacker's final game at Emirates Stadium.

9 May 2018 37	Leicester City	3–1	Arsenal	Leicester
19:45 BST	Iheanacho 14'; Vardy 76' (pen.); Simpson (yellow card) 78'; Mahrez (yellow card) 85', (goal) 90'	Report	Mavropanos (red card) 15'; Aubameyang 53'; Holding (yellow card) 75'; Xhaka (yellow card) 77'	Stadium: King Power Stadium; Attendance: 32,095; Referee: Graham Scott

13 May 2018 38	Huddersfield Town	0–1	Arsenal	Huddersfield
15:00 BST	Jørgensen (yellow card) 90+3'	Report	Aubameyang 38'	Stadium: John Smith's Stadium; Attendance: 24,122; Referee: Michael Oliver

=== FA Cup ===
In the FA Cup, Arsenal entered the competition in the third round and were drawn away to Nottingham Forest. Arsenal were knocked out in the third round for the first time since 1996 and therefore the first time under Arsène Wenger.

7 January 2018 Third round	Nottingham Forest	4–2	Arsenal	West Bridgford, Nottinghamshire
16:00 GMT	Lichaj 20', 44'; Brereton 64' (pen.); Dowell 85' (pen.); Worrall (yellow card) 88' (yellow-red card) 89'	Report	Mertesacker 23', (yellow card) 86'; Welbeck 79'; Debuchy (yellow card) 84'; Ospina (yellow card) 85'	Stadium: The City Ground; Attendance: 27,182; Referee: Jonathan Moss

=== EFL Cup ===
Arsenal entered the competition in the third round and were drawn at home to Doncaster Rovers. The Gunners were drawn at home for the fourth round with Norwich City the confirmed visitors. Arsenal were drawn against West Ham United at home for the quarter-finals. Arsenal drew Chelsea in the semi-finals, with the first leg taking place at Stamford Bridge.

20 September 2017 Third round	Arsenal	1–0	Doncaster Rovers	Holloway
19:45 BST	Walcott 25'	Report	Mason (yellow card) 68'	Stadium: Emirates Stadium; Attendance: 44,064; Referee: Scott Duncan

24 October 2017 Fourth round	Arsenal	2–1 (a.e.t.)	Norwich City	Holloway
19:45 BST	Elneny (yellow card) 56'; Coquelin (yellow card) 68'; Wilshere (yellow card) 78'; Nketiah 85', 96'; Akpom (yellow card) 88'	Report	Murphy 34'; Trybull (yellow card) 89'; Husband (yellow card) 90'	Stadium: Emirates Stadium; Attendance: 58,444; Referee: Andrew Madley

19 December 2017 Quarter-finals (Fifth round)	Arsenal	1–0	West Ham United	Holloway
19:45 GMT	Welbeck 42'	Report	Hart (yellow card) 71'	Stadium: Emirates Stadium; Attendance: 44,741; Referee: Kevin Friend

10 January 2018 Semi-finals – 1st leg	Chelsea	0–0	Arsenal	Fulham, London
20:00 GMT	Kanté (yellow card) 79'	Report	Xhaka (yellow card) 51'; Elneny (yellow card) 86'	Stadium: Stamford Bridge; Attendance: 40,097; Referee: Martin Atkinson

24 January 2018 Semi-finals – 2nd leg	Arsenal	2–1 (2–1 agg.)	Chelsea	Holloway
20:00 GMT	Rüdiger 12' (o.g.); Xhaka 60'; Monreal (yellow card) 66'	Report	Hazard 7'	Stadium: Emirates Stadium; Attendance: 58,964; Referee: Michael Oliver

25 February 2018 Final	Arsenal	0–3	Manchester City	Wembley, London
16:30 GMT	Bellerín (yellow card) 24'; Ramsey (yellow card) 32'; Chambers (yellow card) 47'; Wilshere (yellow card) 88'	Report	Agüero 18'; Fernandinho (yellow card) 36'; Kompany 58', (yellow card) 80'; D. Silva 65'	Stadium: Wembley Stadium; Attendance: 85,671; Referee: Craig Pawson

=== UEFA Europa League ===
On 25 August 2017, the group stages were announced with Arsenal drawn out in Group H alongside BATE Borisov, 1.FC Köln and Red Star Belgrade.

==== Group stage ====
Pos	Team	Pld	W	D	L	GF	GA	GD	Pts	Qualification	ARS	ZVE	KLN	BATE
1	(England) Arsenal	6	4	1	1	14	4	+10	13	Advance to knockout phase	—	0–0	3–1	6–0
2	(Serbia) Red Star Belgrade	6	2	3	1	3	2	+1	9	Advance to knockout phase	0–1	—	1–0	1–1
3	(Germany) 1. FC Köln	6	2	0	4	7	8	−1	6		1–0	0–1	—	5–2
4	(Belarus) BATE Borisov	6	1	2	3	6	16	−10	5		2–4	0–0	1–0	—

Source: UEFA
Rules for classification: Group stage tiebreakers

14 September 2017 1	Arsenal (England)	3–1	(Germany) 1. FC Köln	Holloway, London
21:05 BST (UTC+1)	Kolašinac 49'; Sánchez 67'; Bellerín 81'	Report	Córdoba 10'	Stadium: Emirates Stadium; Attendance: 59,359; Referee: Xavier Estrada Fernández (Spain)

28 September 2017 2	BATE Borisov (Belarus)	2–4	(England) Arsenal	Barysaw
19:00 CET (UTC+1)	Ivanić 28', (yellow card) 87'; Drahun (yellow card) 48'; Milunović (yellow card) 64'; Gordeichuk 67'	Report	Walcott 9', 22'; Holding 25'; Giroud 49' (pen.)	Stadium: Borisov Arena; Attendance: 13,100; Referee: Daniel Stefański (Poland)

19 October 2017 3	Red Star Belgrade (Serbia)	0–1	(England) Arsenal	Dedinje, Belgrade
19:00 CET (UTC+1)	Rodić (yellow card) 32' (yellow-red card) 80'; Boakye (yellow card) 60'; Le Tallec (yellow card) 63'; Borjan (yellow card) 86'	Report	Coquelin (yellow card) 65'; Giroud 85'; Nelson (yellow card) 90+2'	Stadium: Red Star Stadium; Attendance: 50,327; Referee: Benoît Bastien (France)

2 November 2017 4	Arsenal (England)	0–0	(Serbia) Red Star Belgrade	Holloway, London
21:05 CET (UTC+1)	Holding (yellow card) 70'	Report		Stadium: Emirates Stadium; Attendance: 58,285; Referee: Luca Banti (Italy)

23 November 2017 5	1. FC Köln (Germany)	1–0	(England) Arsenal	Lindenthal, Cologne
19:00 CET (UTC+1)	Klünter (yellow card) 56'; Guirassy 62' (pen.), (yellow card) 88'	Report	Debuchy (yellow card) 48'	Stadium: RheinEnergieStadion; Attendance: 45,300; Referee: Vladislav Bezborodov (Russia)

7 December 2017 6	Arsenal (England)	6–0	(Belarus) BATE Borisov	Holloway, London
21:05 CET (UTC+1)	Debuchy 11'; Walcott 37'; Wilshere 43'; Palyakow 51' (o.g.); Giroud 64' (pen.); Elneny 74'	Report	Valadzko (yellow card) 17'	Stadium: Emirates Stadium; Attendance: 25,909; Referee: Robert Schörgenhofer (Austria)

==== Knockout phase ====
===== Round of 32 =====
The draw was held on 11 December 2017, with Arsenal among the seeded teams (as group winners) drawn against one of the unseeded runners-up, Östersund. The first leg was played away on 15 February 2018, and the second leg was played at home on 22 February 2018.

15 February 2018 First leg	Östersund (Sweden)	0–3	(England) Arsenal	Östersund, Sweden
19:00 CET (UTC+1)		Report	Monreal 13'; Papagiannopoulos 24' (o.g.); Özil 58'	Stadium: Jämtkraft Arena; Attendance: 7,665; Referee: David Fernández Borbalán (Spain)

22 February 2018 Second leg	Arsenal (England)	1–2 (4–2 agg.)	(Sweden) Östersund	London, England
21:05 CET (UTC+1)	Maitland-Niles (yellow card) 44'; Kolašinac 47'; Mkhitaryan (yellow card) 88'	Report	Aiesh 22'; Sema 23'; Edwards (yellow card) 79'; Widgren (yellow card) 90+4'	Stadium: Emirates Stadium; Attendance: 58,405; Referee: Ivan Kružliak (Slovakia)

===== Round of 16 =====
8 March 2018 First leg	Milan (Italy)	0–2	(England) Arsenal	Milan, Italy
19:00 CET (UTC+1)		Report	Mkhitaryan 15'; Ramsey 45+4', (yellow card) 71'; Kolašinac (yellow card) 60'	Stadium: San Siro; Attendance: 72,821; Referee: Clément Turpin (France)

15 March 2018 Second leg	Arsenal (England)	3–1 (5–1 agg.)	(Italy) Milan	London, England
21:05 CET (UTC+1)	Welbeck 39' (pen.), 86'; Monreal (yellow card) 45+2'; Xhaka 71'	Report	Çalhanoğlu 35'; G. Donnarumma (yellow card) 39'; Romagnoli (yellow card) 42'; Borini (yellow card) 42'; Suso (yellow card) 61'	Stadium: Emirates Stadium; Attendance: 58,973; Referee: Jonas Eriksson (Sweden)

===== Quarter-finals =====
5 April 2018 First leg	Arsenal (England)	4–1	(Russia) CSKA Moscow	London, England
21:05 CEST (UTC+2); 20:05 BST (UTC+1)	Ramsey 9', 28'; Lacazette 23' (pen.), 35'; Xhaka (yellow card) 57'; Bellerín (yellow card) 78'	Report	Golovin 15'; Dzagoev (yellow card) 31'; Musa (yellow card) 51'; Shchennikov (yellow card) 58'; Akinfeev (yellow card) 74'	Stadium: Emirates Stadium; Attendance: 58,285; Referee: Pavel Královec (Czech Republic)

12 April 2018 Second leg	CSKA Moscow (Russia)	2–2 (3–6 agg.)	(England) Arsenal	Moscow, Russia
22:05 MSK (UTC+3); 20:05 BST (UTC+1)	Chalov 39'; Nababkin 50'; Golovin (yellow card) 86'	Report	Welbeck 75'; Ramsey 90+2'	Stadium: VEB Arena; Attendance: 29,284; Referee: Felix Zwayer (Germany)

===== Semi-finals =====
26 April 2018 First leg	Arsenal (England)	1–1	(Spain) Atlético Madrid	London, England
21:05 CEST (UTC+2); 20:05 BST (UTC+1)	Lacazette 61'	Report	Vrsaljko (yellow card) 2' (yellow-red card) 10'; Griezmann 82'	Stadium: Emirates Stadium; Attendance: 59,066; Referee: Clément Turpin (France)

3 May 2018 Second leg	Atlético Madrid (Spain)	1–0 (2–1 agg.)	(England) Arsenal	Madrid, Spain
21:05 CEST (UTC+2); 20:05 BST (UTC+1)	Costa 45+2', (yellow card) 78'; Gabi (yellow card) 52'; Saúl (yellow card) 71'	Report	Wilshere (yellow card) 42'; Monreal (yellow card) 59'; Mustafi (yellow card) 78'	Stadium: Wanda Metropolitano; Attendance: 64,196; Referee: Gianluca Rocchi (Italy)

== Post-season ==
=== Arsenal Player of the Season award ===
The Player of the Season was awarded to Aaron Ramsey.

== Squad statistics ==
Key

Pos. = Playing position

No. = Squad number

Nat. = Nationality

Apps = Appearances

GK = Goalkeeper

DF = Defender

MF = Midfielder

FW = Forward

= Yellow cards

= Red cards

Numbers in parentheses denote appearances as substitute. Players with number struck through and marked † left the club during the playing season.

No.	Pos.	Name	Premier League		FA Cup		EFL Cup		Europa League		Community Shield		Total		Discipline	
No.	Pos.	Name	Apps	Goals	Apps	Goals	Apps	Goals	Apps	Goals	Apps	Goals	Apps	Goals	A yellow rectangular card	A red rectangular card
2	DF	Mathieu Debuchy †	0	0	1	0	2	0	4	1	0	0	7	1	2	0
4	DF	Per Mertesacker	4 (2)	1	1	1	1	0	3	0	1	0	10 (2)	2	1	0
6	DF	Laurent Koscielny	25	2	0	0	2	0	6	0	0	0	33	2	4	0
7 (Note: Mkhitaryan could not wear number 7 in the UEFA Europa League as Sánchez previously wore the number in the competition. He instead wore the number 77.)	MF	Henrikh Mkhitaryan	9 (2)	2	0	0	0	0	5 (1)	1	0	0	14 (3)	3	1	0
7	MF	Alexis Sánchez †	17 (2)	7	0	0	1 (1)	0	1	1	0	0	19 (3)	8	4	0
8	MF	Aaron Ramsey	21 (3)	7	0	0	1 (1)	0	6	4	0	0	28 (4)	11	2	0
9	FW	Alexandre Lacazette	26 (6)	14	0	0	2	0	4	3	1	0	33 (6)	17	1	0
10	MF	Jack Wilshere	12 (8)	1	0	0	5	0	12 (1)	1	0	0	29 (9)	2	10	0
11	MF	Mesut Özil	24 (2)	4	0	0	2	0	7	1	0	0	33 (2)	5	4	0
12	FW	Olivier Giroud †	1 (15)	4	0	0	3	0	6	3	0 (1)	0	10 (16)	7	0	0
13	GK	David Ospina	4 (1)	0	1	0	5	0	10	0	0	0	20 (1)	0	1	0
14	FW	Pierre-Emerick Aubameyang	12 (1)	10	0	0	1	0	0	0	0	0	13 (1)	10	0	0
14	FW	Theo Walcott †	0 (6)	0	1	0	3	1	5	3	0 (1)	0	9 (7)	4	0	0
15	MF	Alex Oxlade-Chamberlain †	3	0	0	0	0	0	0	0	1	0	4	0	0	0
16	DF	Rob Holding	9 (3)	0	1	0	4	0	7 (1)	1	1	0	22 (4)	1	4	0
17	FW	Alex Iwobi	22 (4)	3	1	0	3 (2)	0	3 (3)	0	1	0	30 (9)	3	1	0
18	DF	Nacho Monreal	26 (2)	5	0	0	2	0	7	1	1	0	36 (2)	5	6	0
20	DF	Shkodran Mustafi	25 (2)	3	0	0	3	0	8	0	0	0	36 (2)	3	7	0
21	DF	Calum Chambers	10 (2)	0	0	0	4	0	5 (3)	0	0	0	19 (5)	0	2	0
23	FW	Danny Welbeck	12 (16)	5	1	1	2 (1)	1	9 (1)	3	1	0	25 (18)	10	2	0
24	DF	Héctor Bellerín	34 (1)	2	0	0	3	0	8	1	1	0	46 (1)	3	8	0
27	DF	Konstantinos Mavropanos	3	0	0	0	0	0	0	0	0	0	3	0	0	1
29	MF	Granit Xhaka	37 (1)	1	0	0	3	1	5 (1)	1	1	0	46 (2)	3	12	0
30	MF	Ainsley Maitland-Niles	8 (7)	0	1	0	3	0	8 (1)	0	0	0	20 (8)	0	2	0
31	DF	Sead Kolašinac	25 (2)	2	0	0	1 (2)	0	2 (3)	2	0 (1)	1	29 (9)	5	4	0
32	FW	Chuba Akpom †	0	0	0 (1)	0	0 (1)	0	0	0	0	0	0 (2)	0	1	0
33	GK	Petr Čech	34	0	0	0	0	0	3	0	1	0	39	0	1	0
34	MF	Francis Coquelin †	1 (6)	0	0	0	2	0	4	0	0	0	7 (6)	0	2	0
35	MF	Mohamed Elneny	11 (2)	0	1	0	4 (1)	0	9 (3)	1	1	0	26 (6)	1	5	0
43	MF	Josh Dasilva	0	0	0	0	0 (3)	0	0	0	0	0	0 (3)	0	0	0
54	GK	Matt Macey	0	0	0	0	1	0	1	0	0	0	2	0	0	0
58	MF	Marcus McGuane †	0	0	0	0	0	0	0 (2)	0	0	0	0 (2)	0	0	0
61	FW	Reiss Nelson	2 (1)	0	1	0	2 (1)	0	3 (5)	0	0 (1)	0	8 (8)	0	1	0
62	FW	Eddie Nketiah	0 (3)	0	0 (1)	0	0 (1)	2	0 (5)	0	0	0	0 (10)	2	0	0
65	MF	Ben Sheaf †	0	0	0	0	0 (1)	0	0 (1)	0	0	0	0 (2)	0	0	0
69	MF	Joe Willock	1 (1)	0	1	0	1 (2)	0	3 (2)	0	0	0	6 (5)	0	0	0
—		Own goals	—	1	—		—	1	—	2	—		—	4	—	

== Transfers ==
For consistency, transfer fees in the tables below are all exclusively sourced from BBC Sport's contemporary report of each transfer. Where the report mentions an initial fee potentially rising to a higher figure depending on contractual clauses being satisfied in the future, only the initial fee is listed in the tables. Arsenal did not sign any players on loan during the season and players who have not made an appearance for the first-team are not included in the tables below. Squad numbers are only listed for players who featured during the season.

Key

GK = Goalkeeper

DF = Defender

MF = Midfielder

FW = Forward

Pos. = Playing position

No. = Squad number

Transfers in
No.	Pos.	Player	Previous club	Fee	Date	Ref.
31	DF	Sead Kolašinac	(Germany) Schalke 04	Free transfer	1 July 2017 (Note: Kolašinac's pre-contract agreement was announced on 6 June 2017, before the season started)	
9	FW	Alexandre Lacazette	(France) Lyon	£46.5m (Note: Lacazette's transfer also included £6.1 million in additional bonuses)	5 July 2017	
27	DF	Konstantinos Mavropanos	(Greece) PAS Giannina	Undisclosed	4 January 2018	
7	MF	Henrikh Mkhitaryan	(England) Manchester United	Swap deal (Note: Mkhitaryan joined Arsenal in exchange for Sánchez, who joined Manchester United)	21 January 2018	
14	FW	Pierre-Emerick Aubameyang	(Germany) Borussia Dortmund	£56m	31 January 2018	

Transfers out
No.	Pos.	Player	Following club	Fee	Date	Ref.
—	MF	Chris Willock	(Portugal) Benfica	Released	30 June 2017 (Note: C.Willock later joined Benfica on 30 June 2017 as a free agent)	
—	DF	Stefan O'Connor	(England) Newcastle United	Released	30 June 2017 (Note: O'Connor later joined Newcastle United on 6 July 2017 as a free agent)	
—	FW	Yaya Sanogo	(France) Toulouse	Released	30 June 2017 (Note: Sanogo later joined Toulouse on 9 July 2017 as a free agent)	
—	MF	Glen Kamara	(Scotland) Dundee	Released	30 June 2017 (Note: Kamara later joined Dundee on 13 July 2017 as a free agent)	
—	GK	Wojciech Szczęsny	(Italy) Juventus	£10m	19 July 2017	
—	DF	Gabriel Paulista	(Spain) Valencia	Undisclosed	18 August 2017	
—	MF	Ismaël Bennacer	(Italy) Empoli	Undisclosed	21 August 2017	
3	DF	Kieran Gibbs	(England) West Bromwich Albion	£5m	29 August 2017	
15	MF	Alex Oxlade-Chamberlain	(England) Liverpool	£35m	31 August 2017	
34	DF	Francis Coquelin	(Spain) Valencia	£12m	11 January 2018	
14	FW	Theo Walcott	(England) Everton	£20m	17 January 2018	
7	MF	Alexis Sánchez	(England) Manchester United	Swap deal	21 January 2018	
58	MF	Marcus McGuane	(Spain) Barcelona	Undisclosed	30 January 2018	
2	DF	Mathieu Debuchy	(France) Saint-Étienne	Released	31 January 2018 (Note: Debuchy later joined Saint-Etienne on 31 January 2018 as a free agent after Arsenal terminated his contract)	
12	FW	Olivier Giroud	(England) Chelsea	£18m	31 January 2018	

Loans out
No.	Pos.	Player	Loaned to	Date	Loan expired	Ref.
—	GK	Emiliano Martínez	(Spain) Getafe	2 August 2017	30 June 2018	
—	DF	Carl Jenkinson	(England) Birmingham City	21 August 2017	30 June 2018	
—	FW	Lucas Pérez	(Spain) Deportivo La Coruña	31 August 2017	30 June 2018	
—	FW	Joel Campbell	(Spain) Real Betis	31 August 2017	30 June 2018	
65	MF	Ben Sheaf	(England) Stevenage	26 January 2018	30 June 2018	
—	DF	Krystian Bielik	(England) Walsall	31 January 2018	30 June 2018	
—	MF	Jeff Reine-Adélaïde	(France) Angers	31 January 2018	30 June 2018	
32	FW	Chuba Akpom	(Belgium) Sint-Truidense	31 January 2018	30 June 2018	

== See also ==
- 2017–18 in English football
- List of Arsenal F.C. seasons
