= Rob Holding =

English footballer (born 1995)

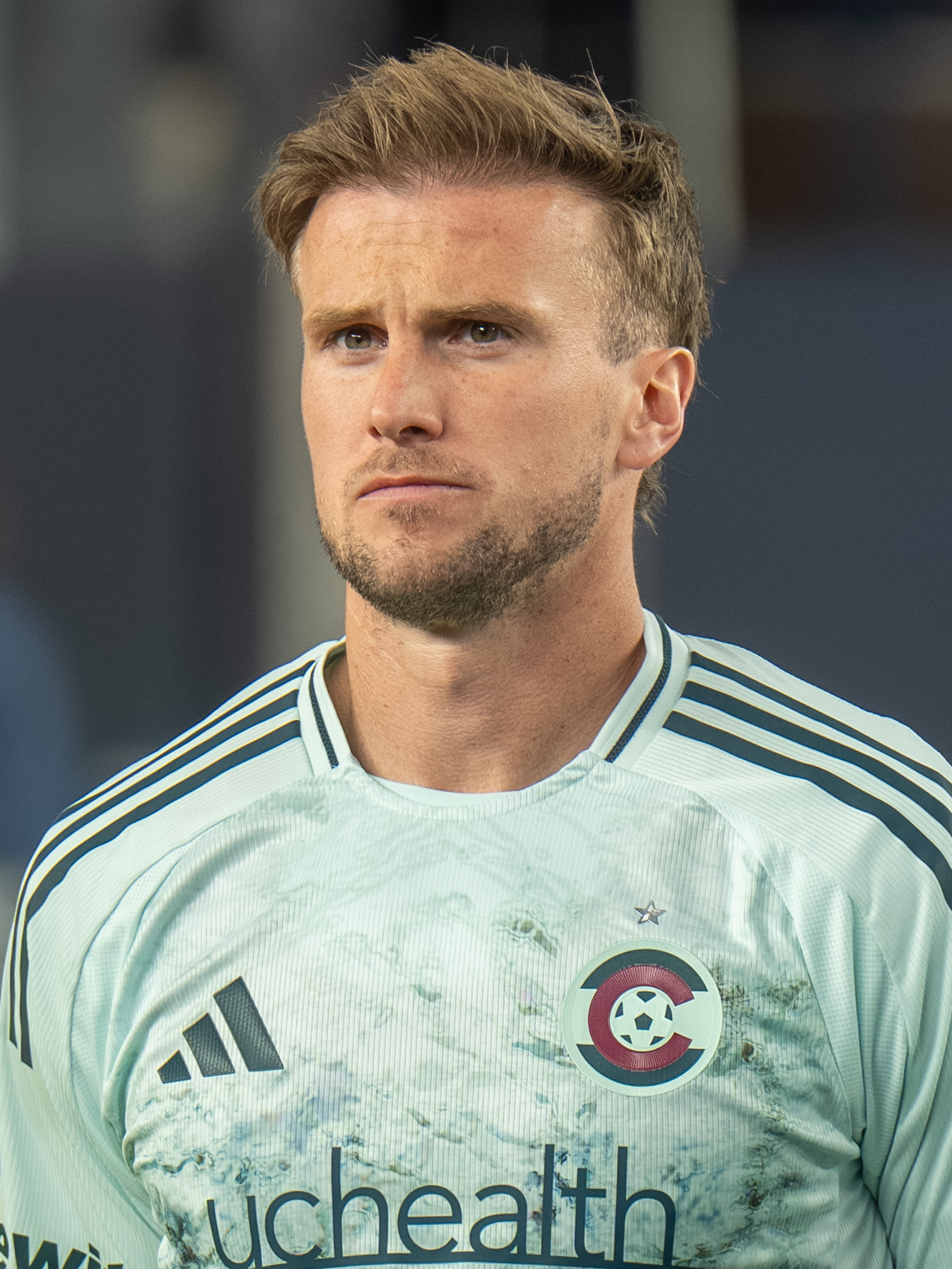
- Holding with the Colorado Rapids in 2026

Personal information
- Full name: Robert Samuel Holding
- Date of birth: 20 September 1995 (age 31)
- Place of birth: Stalybridge, England
- Height: 6 ft 2 in (1.89 m)
- Position: Centre-back

Team information
- Current team: Colorado Rapids
- Number: 6

Youth career
- 2003–2014: Bolton Wanderers

Senior career*
Years	Team	Apps	(Gls)
2014–2016	Bolton Wanderers	26	(1)
2015	→ Bury (loan)	1	(0)
2016–2023	Arsenal	98	(2)
2023–2025	Crystal Palace	0	(0)
2025	→ Sheffield United (loan)	10	(0)
2025–	Colorado Rapids	36	(0)

International career
2016–2017	England U21	5	(0)
- * Club domestic league appearances and goals as of 31 October 2026 (UTC)

Robert Samuel Holding (born 20 September 1995) is an English professional footballer who plays as a centre-back for Major League Soccer club Colorado Rapids.

Holding progressed through the Bolton Wanderers youth system, making his senior debut in April 2015 while on loan at Bury. After one season in the Bolton first team, he signed for Premier League club Arsenal in July 2016. He has won the FA Cup twice and the FA Community Shield three times with the club. At Arsenal, he earned a reputation as a dogged defender, with good tackling and aerial ability. Holding has also represented England at under-21 level and was part of the team that won the Toulon Tournament in 2016.

== Early life ==
Holding was born and raised in Stalybridge, Greater Manchester. He attended West Hill School in the town.

== Club career ==
=== Bolton Wanderers ===
Holding played for Stalybridge Celtic Juniors before joining the Bolton Wanderers youth system at the age of seven. He joined League Two club Bury on loan on 26 March 2015 for rest of the 2014–15 season. Holding made his only Bury appearance on 3 April 2015 as a 79th-minute substitute in a 2–0 away win against Cambridge United. On his return to Bolton, he signed his professional contract with the club.

Holding made his Bolton debut on 11 August 2015 as a starter in a 1–0 home defeat to Burton Albion in the League Cup. He scored his first goal for the club on 23 January 2016 in the seventh minute of a 3–1 home win against Milton Keynes Dons. Holding was voted as Bolton Wanderers' Player of the Year for the 2015–16 season. He made 30 appearances, scoring one goal, as the team finished bottom of the Championship and were relegated to League One.

=== Arsenal ===
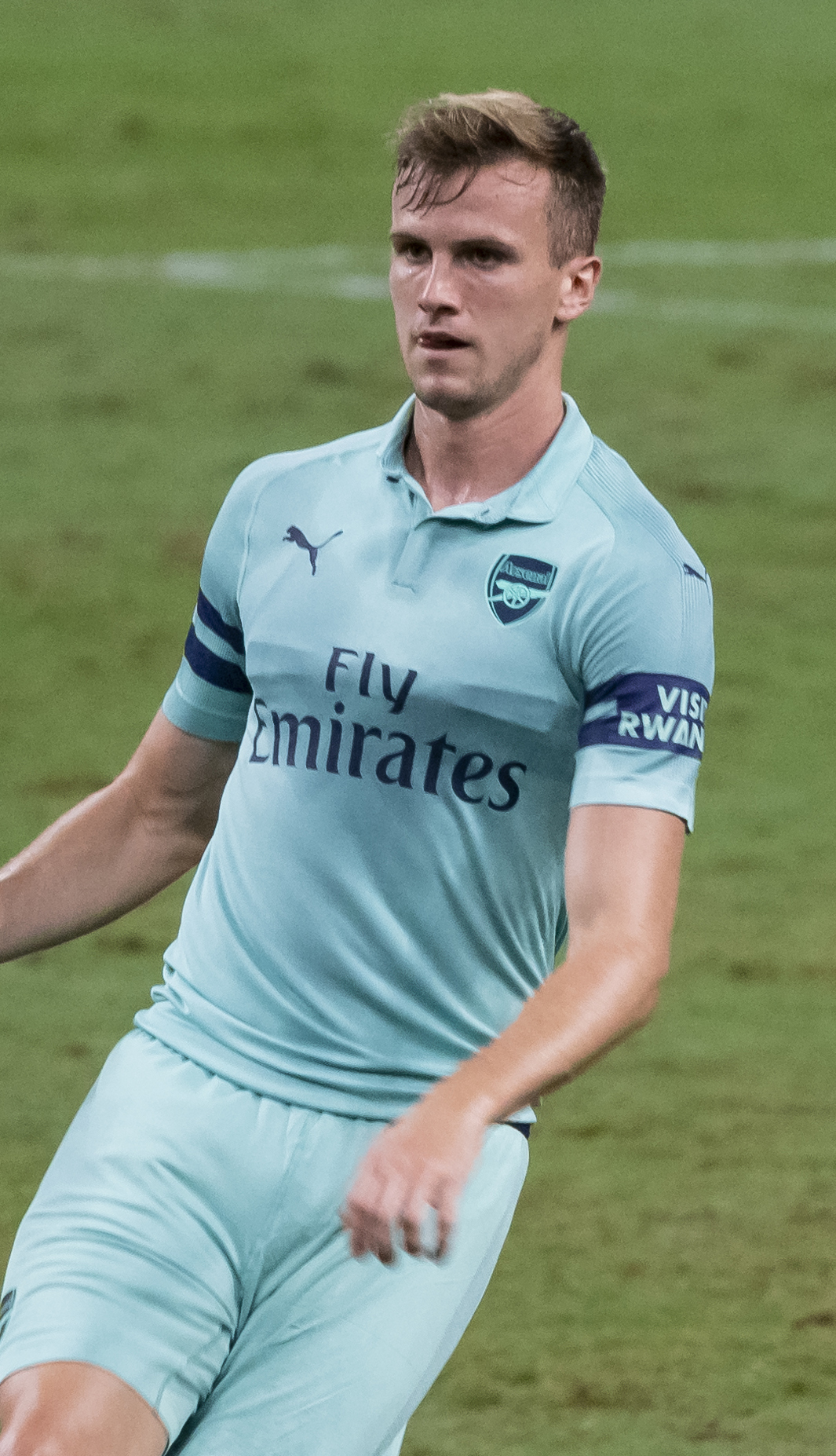
Holding playing for Arsenal in 2018

Holding signed for Premier League club Arsenal on 22 July 2016 for a fee of around £2 million. Following injuries to centre backs Per Mertesacker and Gabriel Paulista, he was called upon to make his Arsenal debut in the 2016–17 Premier League season opener on 14 August 2016 against Liverpool, which Arsenal lost 4–3 at home. After his performance in the game against Leicester City, former Arsenal manager, Arsène Wenger, once famously said in the post match press conference, "Unfortunately no one speaks about the performance of Rob Holding. You should be happy, he is English and 20 years old. I am sorry he didn't cost £55 million, so he can't be good." In the final two months of the season, Holding became a regular member of Arsenal's starting line-up, with the team winning all six of the matches he played in the Premier League. He played the full 90 minutes in Arsenal's 2–1 victory over Chelsea on 27 May in the 2017 FA Cup Final at Wembley Stadium.

Holding played in the 2017 FA Community Shield against Chelsea on 6 August, which Arsenal won 4–1 on penalties after a 1–1 draw. He scored his first Arsenal goal on 28 September 2017 with a close-range shot in their 4–2 away win over BATE Borisov in the UEFA Europa League. He signed a new long-term contract with the club on 1 May 2018.

On 5 December 2018, Holding suffered a ruptured anterior cruciate ligament in his left knee during a 2–2 draw against Manchester United. He would undergo surgery and was expected to be out for about six to nine months.

Holding made his return to first team action on 24 September 2019 in Arsenal's 5–0 EFL Cup home victory against Nottingham Forest. He marked his return from injury with his first goal at Emirates Stadium, scoring Arsenal's third from a Reiss Nelson corner-kick. On 1 August 2020, Holding was selected to start in the FA Cup final against Chelsea, and went on to win his second winners' medal as Arsenal won their 14th FA Cup.

On 28 August 2020, Holding was in the starting 11 in the 2020 FA Community Shield, which Arsenal clinched a 5–4 victory over Liverpool in the penalty shootout after the match was 1–1 after 90 minutes. On 12 January 2021, Holding committed his future to Arsenal by signing a new three-and-a-half-year deal. He earned his 100th appearance for the Arsenal in the 3–1 victory over Southampton two weeks later.

On 1 May 2022, Holding scored his first Premier League goal on his 81st appearance in the competition, netting Arsenal's first goal via a Bukayo Saka corner-kick in an eventual 2–1 away victory against West Ham United at the London Stadium. Eleven days later, he received his first career red card, picking up a second yellow away against rivals Tottenham Hotspur in the 33rd minute of the North London derby after two bookable offences both on Son Heung-min, with Arsenal going on to lose 3–0.

On 26 April 2023, Holding scored his second Premier League goal in a 4–1 away loss against Manchester City.

=== Crystal Palace ===
On 1 September 2023, Premier League club Crystal Palace signed Holding for a reported £4 million on a three-year deal. He made his debut on 26 September, away to Manchester United in the EFL Cup, playing the whole match and receiving a yellow card in a 3–0 defeat; it would turn out to be his sole appearance for the club.

In October 2024, manager Oliver Glasner stated that Holding had been frozen out of the squad and was training individually following a disagreement between the pair. Holding subsequently deleted all references to Crystal Palace from his Instagram page and unfollowed the club on the platform, and went on to only make sporadic appearances for the under-21 side.

==== Loan to Sheffield United ====
On 3 February 2025, Holding was signed by EFL Championship club Sheffield United on a loan until the end of the season. He departed having featured once for Crystal Palace in the EFL Cup in one and a half years, and having made zero appearances in the Premier League.

=== Colorado Rapids ===
On 3 August 2025, Holding signed for MLS club Colorado Rapids on an 18-month deal after leaving Crystal Palace as a free agent. In April 2026, the club announced Holding had been granted a U.S. green card, and would now qualify as a domestic player.

== International career ==
Holding was called up to the England under-21 squad for the Toulon Tournament May 2016 as a replacement for Everton defender Brendan Galloway. He made his debut for Gareth Southgate's team when starting against Guinea on 23 May. England won the tournament with Holding making two appearances, and was an unused substitute in the final on 29 May as England beat France 2–1. He was selected for England's squad for the 2017 UEFA European Under-21 Championship in Poland, but did not make an appearance with England eliminated in the semi-finals. Holding made five appearances for the under-21s from 2016 to 2017.

== Personal life ==
In 2026, Holding acquired a Green Card. He also began dating Angel City FC forward Sveindís Jane Jónsdóttir in 2024.

== Career statistics ==
=== Club ===
As of match played 31 October 2026

Appearances and goals by club, season and competition
Club	Season	League			National cup (Note: Includes FA Cup, U.S. Open Cup)		League cup (Note: Includes Football League/EFL Cup)		Continental		Other		Total	
Club	Season	Division	Apps	Goals	Apps	Goals	Apps	Goals	Apps	Goals	Apps	Goals	Apps	Goals
Bolton Wanderers	2014–15	Championship	0	0	0	0	0	0	—		—		0	0
Bolton Wanderers	2015–16	Championship	26	1	3	0	1	0	—		—		30	1
Bolton Wanderers	Total		26	1	3	0	1	0	—		—		30	1
Bury (loan)	2014–15	League Two	1	0	—		—		—		—		1	0
Arsenal	2016–17	Premier League	9	0	5	0	3	0	1 (Note: Appearance in UEFA Champions League)	0	—		18	0
Arsenal	2017–18	Premier League	12	0	1	0	4	0	8 (Note: Appearances in UEFA Europa League)	1	1 (Note: Appearance in FA Community Shield)	0	26	1
Arsenal	2018–19	Premier League	10	0	0	0	1	0	5	0	—		16	0
Arsenal	2019–20	Premier League	8	0	5	0	2	1	3	0	—		18	1
Arsenal	2020–21	Premier League	30	0	1	0	2	0	5	0	1	0	39	0
Arsenal	2021–22	Premier League	15	1	1	0	5	0	—		—		21	1
Arsenal	2022–23	Premier League	14	1	2	0	1	0	7	1	—		24	2
Arsenal	2023–24	Premier League	0	0	—		—		—		0	0	0	0
Arsenal	Total		98	2	15	0	18	1	29	2	2	0	162	5
Crystal Palace	2023–24	Premier League	0	0	0	0	1	0	—		—		1	0
Crystal Palace	2024–25	Premier League	0	0	0	0	0	0	—		—		0	0
Crystal Palace	Total		0	0	0	0	1	0	—		—		1	0
Crystal Palace U21	2024–25	—			—		—		—		2 (Note: Appearances in EFL Trophy)	0	2	0
Sheffield United (loan)	2024–25	Championship	10	0	—		—		—		1 (Note: Appearance in Championship play-offs)	0	11	0
Colorado Rapids	2025	Major League Soccer	6	0	—		—		—		0	0	6	0
Colorado Rapids	2026	Major League Soccer	30	0	4	0	—		—		—		34	0
Colorado Rapids	Total		36	0	4	0	—		—		0	0	40	0
Career total			171	3	22	0	20	1	29	2	5	0	247	6

== Honours ==
Arsenal

- FA Cup: 2016–17, 2019–20
- FA Community Shield: 2017, 2020, 2023

England U21

- Toulon Tournament: 2016

Individual

- Bolton Wanderers Player of the Year: 2015–16
