= 2017 FA Community Shield =

- The match programme cover
Arsenal	Chelsea
1	1
- Arsenal won 4–1 on penalties
- Date: 6 August 2017
- Venue: Wembley Stadium, London
- Man of the Match: Granit Xhaka (Arsenal)
- Referee: Bobby Madley (West Yorkshire)
- Attendance: 83,325
- Weather: Partly cloudy 21 °C (70 °F)

The 2017 FA Community Shield (also known as The FA Community Shield supported by McDonald's for sponsorship reasons) was the 95th FA Community Shield, an annual football match played between the winners of the previous season's Premier League and FA Cup competitions. It was held at Wembley Stadium on 6 August 2017. The match was played between Chelsea, champions of the 2016–17 Premier League and Arsenal, who beat their opponents to win the 2017 FA Cup final. Watched by a crowd of 83,325, Arsenal won the Shield 4–1 on penalties, after the match finished 1–1 after 90 minutes. The shoot-out was notable as the ABBA system was trialled for the first time in English football; the format sees teams take back-to-back penalties rather than alternating.

Manchester United were the defending champions as winners of the 2016 edition, but did not qualify for this match, as they finished sixth in the Premier League and were knocked out of the FA Cup in the quarter-finals.

This was Arsenal's 22nd Shield appearance to Chelsea's 12th. For Arsenal, Alexandre Lacazette made his competitive debut, while Olivier Giroud and Theo Walcott started as substitutes. Their squad did not include Alexis Sánchez, Laurent Koscielny and Mesut Özil – all absent for differing reasons. Midfielder Cesc Fàbregas started against his former team, playing alongside N'Golo Kanté. New signings Álvaro Morata, Antonio Rüdiger and Willy Caballero were all named on the bench. Striker Diego Costa was omitted from the Chelsea squad as he did not feature in manager Antonio Conte's pre-season preparations.

After a subdued first half, Chelsea took the lead in the 46th minute when Victor Moses scored. A late challenge by Pedro on Mohamed Elneny resulted in the Chelsea attacker being shown a red card; from the free-kick Arsenal were awarded, substitute Sead Kolašinac scored on his debut. As there were no further goals, the match was decided by a penalty shoot-out. Thibaut Courtois and Morata missed their penalties, leaving Giroud to score the winning one.

== Background ==
Founded in 1908 as a successor to the Sheriff of London Charity Shield, the FA Community Shield began as a contest between the respective champions of the Football League and Southern League, although in 1913 it was played between an Amateurs XI and a Professionals XI. In 1921, it was played by the league champions of the top division and FA Cup winners for the first time. (Note: The Premier League replaced the Football League First Division at the top of the English football pyramid after its inception in 1992.) As part of a sponsorship deal between The Football Association (FA) and American restaurant chain McDonald's, the match was officially referred to as "The FA Community Shield supported by McDonald's". It was televised live in the United Kingdom on BT Sport 1, with highlights shown later that night on BBC One. The FA brought forward the kick-off time an hour earlier to avoid a fixture clash with the UEFA Women's Euro 2017 final.

Chelsea qualified for the 2017 FA Community Shield as winners of the 2016–17 Premier League. The turning point in their season came in September 2016, following successive defeats, first at home to Liverpool and then away at Arsenal. Manager Antonio Conte adopted a 3–4–3 formation which saw Chelsea embark on a 13-match winning run. The club won the Premier League with two matches to spare, and later set a new divisional record for the most wins (30). Chelsea later faced Arsenal in the 2017 FA Cup final, on course to complete a domestic double for the second time in the club's history. A disciplined display by Arsenal, however, saw Arsène Wenger's side triumph and secure a Community Shield spot. Like Conte, Wenger had adopted a similar tactical change during the season, playing three defenders at the back. Arsenal's noteworthy performance in the cup final was attributed to the formation switch.

The 2017 edition was the first competitive fixture in English football to trial the ABBA penalty shoot-out system, provided scores were level after 90 minutes. The format is similar to a tiebreak in tennis, and is designed "to prevent the team going second from having to play catch-up." Unlike a traditional penalty shoot-out, which sees Team A and Team B alternate spot-kicks in an ABAB pattern, the ABBA format follows an 'AB BA AB BA' order.

== Pre-match ==
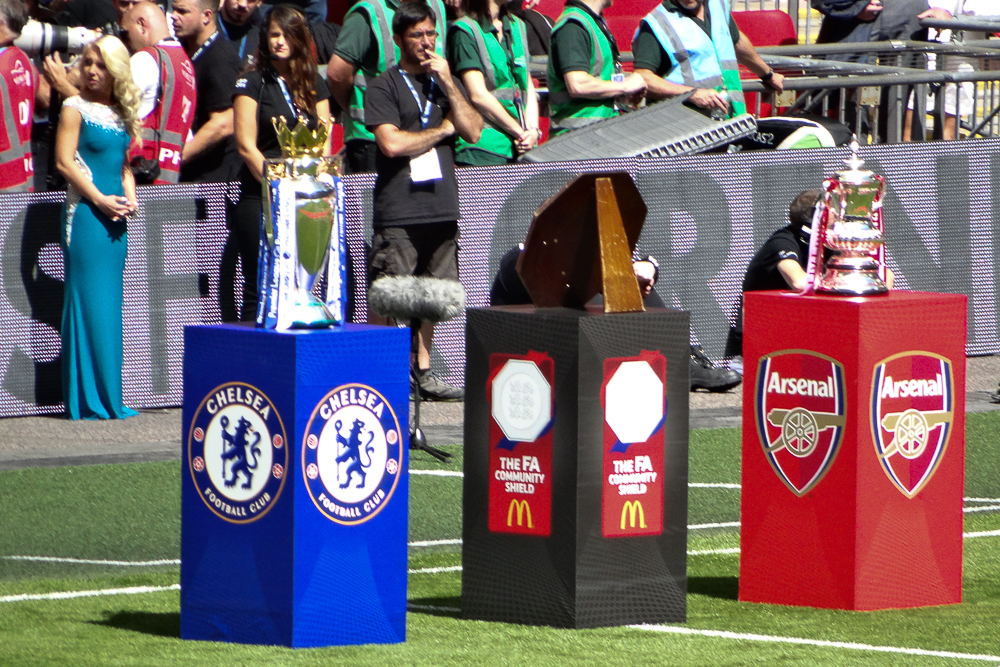
The Premier League trophy (left), the FA Community Shield and the FA Cup displayed on the Wembley Stadium pitch

Chelsea were making their twelfth appearance in the Community Shield; prior to this they had won four (1970, 2000, 2005, 2009) and lost six, most recently in 2015 against their present-day opponents. By contrast, Arsenal made their 22nd Community Shield appearance, and won 13, including one shared in 1991. Both clubs were meeting for the third time in the Shield; their first encounter 12 years ago ended 2–1 in Chelsea's favour.

Conte used his press conference to reiterate the need for Chelsea to strengthen their squad ahead of the new season: "We have a small squad, I think only one player is not enough to improve our team. We need more players that are not top level like Neymar, but we need to improve our squad." He spoke of the importance of winning the fixture as it presented the first trophy of the season and hoped the spectators would see a "good game" against Arsenal. Conte ruled Eden Hazard and Tiémoué Bakayoko out of the match with injuries and confirmed Victor Moses would play; the right-wing-back was sent off in the cup final and his one-match suspension carried over to the new season. Following a review by the FA in August, Moses was made available for the Community Shield fixture, but served a ban against Burnley on the opening weekend of the Premier League season.

Wenger told reporters that he saw the Community Shield as "...a good opportunity to repeat the performance from the [FA Cup] final and give competition to players who need it." When assessing his opponents Chelsea, he noted they had kept the "basis of the squad", and felt Bakayoko was a solid addition. The future of Alexis Sánchez was a major talking point throughout the summer; Wenger adamantly told the press: "My decision is clear, he will stay. He will accept that." Midfielder Francis Coquelin was ruled out by injury, while Sanchez, Laurent Koscielny, Aaron Ramsey and Mesut Özil were sidelined.

Bobby Madley was selected as the referee for the Shield match; he had been the fourth official of the Cup final between the two sides. Both clubs received an allocation of approximately 28,300 tickets. Arsenal were housed in the east end of Wembley Stadium, while Chelsea fans occupied the west. Ticket prices were advertised at a cost of between £20 and £45 – juniors and seniors received concessions of up to £10. Proceeds from the match went to those affected by the Grenfell Tower fire in June; families of the victims, survivors, and emergency services personnel were invited to the event as guests.

== Match ==
=== Team selection ===
The teamsheets showed both clubs lined-up with a three-man defence. Michy Batshuayi led the Chelsea attack, either side of Pedro and Willian. Midfielder Cesc Fàbregas started against his former side, partnering N'Golo Kanté in midfield, while Moses and Marcos Alonso were deployed as wingbacks. Defender Gary Cahill played his first competitive game as club captain; he officially took over the responsibility from John Terry in July. Forward Alexandre Lacazette made his competitive debut for Arsenal, alongside Danny Welbeck and Alex Iwobi. Defender Per Mertesacker, whose performance against Chelsea in the Cup final earned plaudits, was named in the starting eleven. Chelsea's new signings Antonio Rüdiger and Álvaro Morata began the game as substitutes, while Arsenal included Sead Kolašinac and Reiss Nelson in their matchday squad.

=== Summary ===
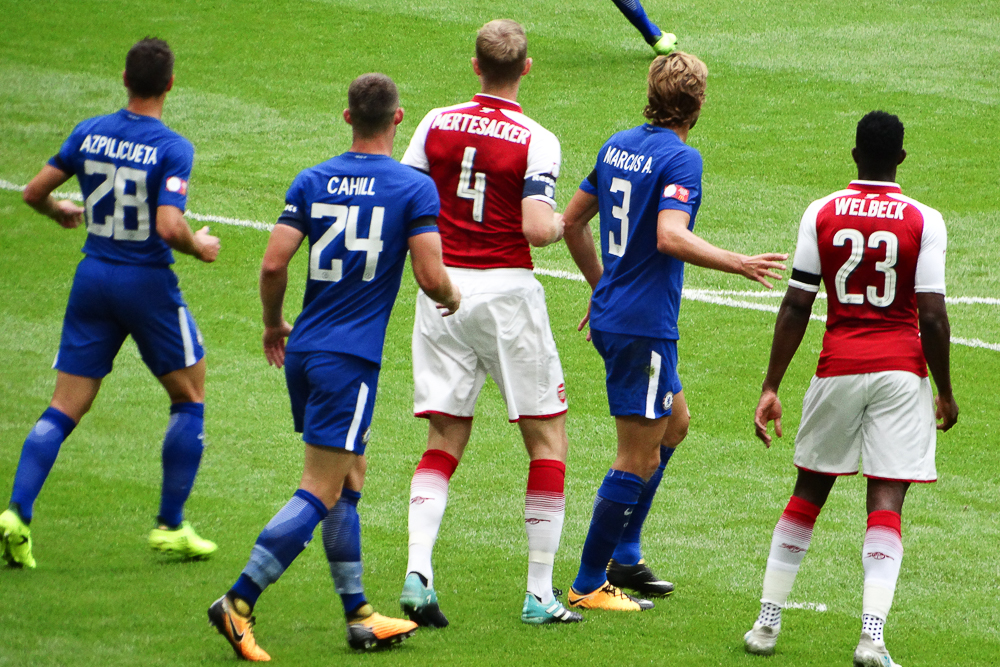
Per Mertesacker was substituted in the first half, having suffered a head injury.

The stadium observed a period of silence in memory of the victims of the Grenfell Tower fire; wreaths were laid on the pitch in memory moments before kick-off. Chelsea got the match underway in their home strip of blue, but found their time on the ball limited as Arsenal dictated play. In the seventh minute Iwobi used his pace to get the better of Chelsea defender David Luiz, but his cutback failed to reach Lacazette's feet, instead hitting the striker's body and deflecting wide. Arsenal came forward moments later, when Granit Xhaka's pass went over the Chelsea defence and found a roaming Welbeck. The striker's header was easily caught by Thibaut Courtois in goal. By the midway point of the first half, Chelsea had enjoyed bouts of possession with Pedro and Batshuayi testing their opponents. Arsenal created the first real chance of the game in the 22nd minute; Lacazette spearheaded a counter-attack and his curling shot went around Cahill and against the post. Lacazette was involved in another move two minutes later, finding Alex Oxlade-Chamberlain in space, but the England player was intercepted by Moses. Mertesacker required medical attention the 27th minute after colliding with Cahill. The defender was taken off with a head injury and replaced by Kolašinac, who played as left full-back. Chelsea gathered momentum as the half drew to a close; Pedro had a shot saved by Čech, and Willian appealed for a penalty when he fell to the ground in the penalty box after a challenge from Héctor Bellerín. The referee, Madley, however booked the midfielder for simulation.

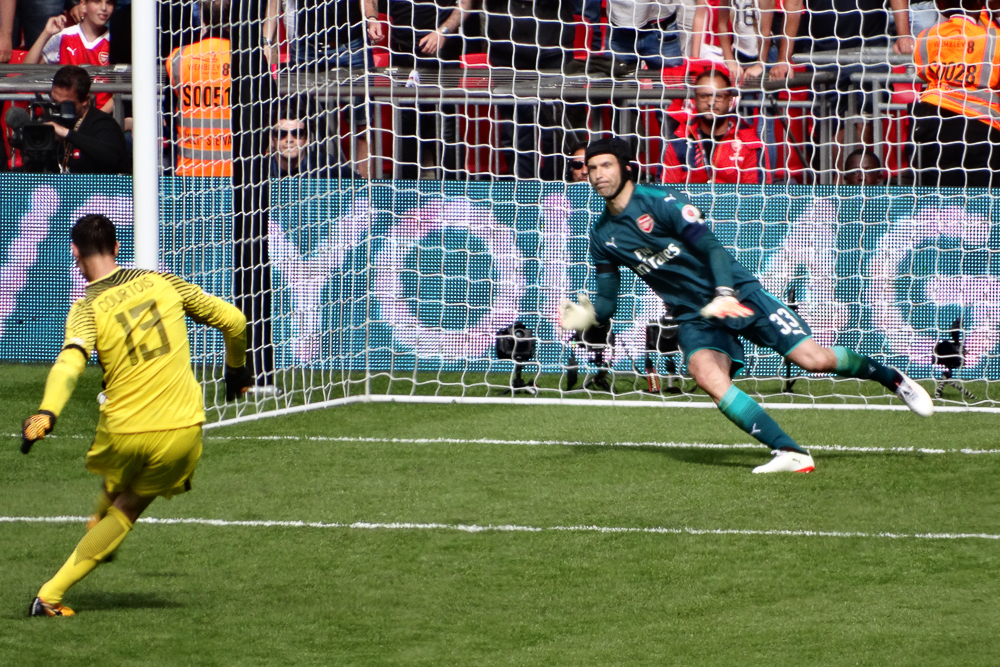
Thibaut Courtois missed his penalty in the shoot-out, sending the ball over the crossbar.

In the opening minute of the second half, Chelsea went a goal ahead. A poor clearance by Xhaka from a corner allowed Cahill to head the ball back in the Arsenal box. Moses, rushing in, used his chest to control the ball, before shooting past Čech. Arsenal found it difficult to create clear-cut chances, as Chelsea controlled possession. Mohamed Elneny’s effort just before the hour mark was well-handled by Courtois, while Welbeck minutes later had his opportunity snuffed out by Luiz. Wenger brought on Giroud and Walcott for Lacazette and Iwobi in the last 30 minutes. Conte also made an attacking substitution, replacing Batshuayi for Morata. The turning point of the match came in the 80th minute; a late challenge by Pedro on Elneny resulted in the Chelsea attacker being shown a red card. Arsenal were awarded a free-kick and from that they scored the equaliser. Xhaka’s delivery met Kolašinac, whose header went across Courtois and into the net.

No further goals meant the game was decided by a penalty shoot-out. The first three penalties were scored – Cahill for Chelsea, and Walcott and Nacho Monreal for Arsenal, before Courtois kicked his over the bar and Morata saw his go wide. Oxlade-Chamberlain converted his and Giroud scored the winning penalty to give Arsenal a 4–1 win in the shoot-out.

=== Details ===
6 August 2017
14:00 BST

Arsenal	1–1	Chelsea
Kolašinac 82'	Report	Moses 46'
Penalties
Walcott (penalty scored); Monreal (penalty scored); Oxlade-Chamberlain (penalty scored); Giroud (penalty scored)	4–1	(penalty scored) Cahill; (penalty missed) Courtois; (penalty missed) Morata

Wembley Stadium, London
Attendance: 83,325
Referee: Bobby Madley (West Yorkshire)

Arsenal	Chelsea

GK	33	(Czech Republic) Petr Čech
CB	16	(England) Rob Holding
CB	4	(Germany) Per Mertesacker (c)		(substituted off) 33'
CB	18	(Spain) Nacho Monreal
RM	24	(Spain) Héctor Bellerín	(yellow card) 16'
CM	35	(Egypt) Mohamed Elneny
CM	29	(Switzerland) Granit Xhaka
LM	15	(England) Alex Oxlade-Chamberlain
AM	17	(Nigeria) Alex Iwobi		(substituted off) 67'
AM	23	(England) Danny Welbeck		(substituted off) 87'
CF	9	(France) Alexandre Lacazette		(substituted off) 66'
Substitutes:
GK	13	(Colombia) David Ospina
DF	31	(Bosnia and Herzegovina) Sead Kolašinac		(substituted on) 33'
MF	61	(England) Reiss Nelson		(substituted on) 87'
MF	69	(England) Joe Willock
MF	30	(England) Ainsley Maitland-Niles
FW	12	(France) Olivier Giroud		(substituted on) 66'
FW	14	(England) Theo Walcott		(substituted on) 67'
Manager:
(France) Arsène Wenger

GK	13	(Belgium) Thibaut Courtois
CB	28	(Spain) César Azpilicueta	(yellow card) 13'
CB	30	(Brazil) David Luiz
CB	24	(England) Gary Cahill (c)
RM	15	(Nigeria) Victor Moses
CM	4	(Spain) Cesc Fàbregas
CM	7	(France) N'Golo Kanté
LM	3	(Spain) Marcos Alonso	(yellow card) 35'	(substituted off) 79'
AM	22	(Brazil) Willian	(yellow card) 37'	(substituted off) 82'
AM	11	(Spain) Pedro	(red card) 80'
CF	23	(Belgium) Michy Batshuayi		(substituted off) 74'
Substitutes:
GK	1	(Argentina) Willy Caballero
DF	2	(Germany) Antonio Rüdiger		(substituted on) 79'
DF	27	(Denmark) Andreas Christensen
MF	17	(Belgium) Charly Musonda		(substituted on) 82'
MF	36	(United States) Kyle Scott
MF	38	(Ivory Coast) Jeremie Boga
FW	9	(Spain) Álvaro Morata		(substituted on) 74'
Head coach:
(Italy) Antonio Conte

Man of the Match:
Granit Xhaka (Arsenal)

Assistant referees:
Simon Bennett (Staffordshire)
Constantine Hatzidakis (Kent)
Fourth official:
Graham Scott (Berks & Bucks)
Fifth official:
Edward Smart (Birmingham)

Match rules

- 90 minutes
- Penalty shoot-out (ABBA) if scores level
- Seven named substitutes, of which up to six may be used

=== Statistics ===
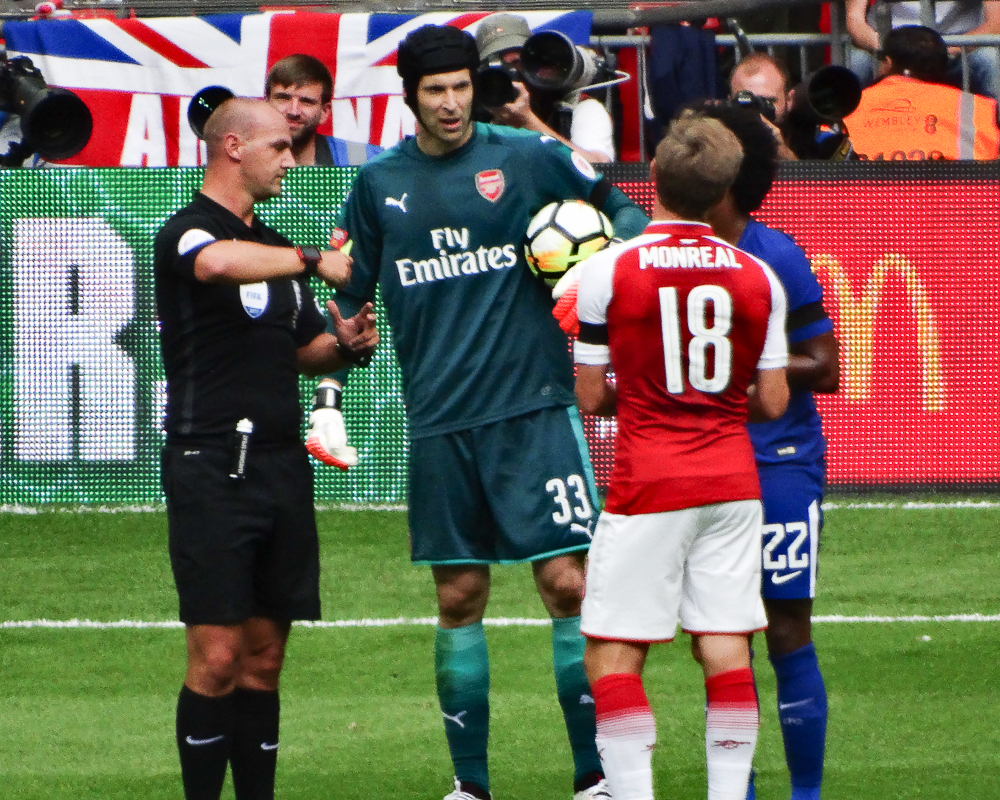
Referee Bobby Madley showed four yellow cards in the match.

Statistic	Arsenal	Chelsea
Goals scored	1	1
Possession	54.4%	45.6%
Shots on target	4	4
Shots off target	5	2
Corner kicks	5	4
Saves	3	3
Fouls	8	12
Interceptions	10	11
Offsides	1	4
Yellow cards	1	3
Red cards	0	1

== Post-match ==
"The two teams gave everything and the game was of great intensity. Even when we were 1–0 down we didn't panic, kept control of our game and came back."

— Arsène Wenger speaking to reporters, post-match.

The result marked the first time Arsenal had won a penalty shoot-out in the Community Shield; they had lost their previous two in 1993 and 2003. For Chelsea, it was the fourth time in a row they had lost in the Shield. Conte was puzzled as to why the referee chose to book Willian, joking had he spoke to Madley "...we would stay and finish the game at 9 p.m." He was disappointed in the manner his team had lost the match, having a man sent off, and called on his players to focus ahead of the new season. Conte also defended Courtois's spot kick, saying "He is one of the best players [at the club] at taking penalties."

Wenger was heartened by Arsenal's performance, describing the victory as "...an encouragement. Not more than that." He was unsure whether Pedro deserved to be dismissed, but felt his team were growing in the second half and "always looked dangerous." Of the new season he said, "We have had some bad starts recently in the last four years in the first game of the Premier League. Let's go into the Premier League now with the same discipline and the same spirit and see where we can go."

An average of 648,000 viewers watched coverage of the match on BT Sport 1.

The Community Shield marked Wenger's 17th title with Arsenal. However it would turn out to be the final title Arsenal achieved under Wenger as Wenger would leave the club at the end of the 2017-18 season.

== See also ==
- 2017–18 Premier League
- 2017–18 FA Cup
- Arsenal F.C.–Chelsea F.C. rivalry
