= 2017 FA Cup final =

English association football match

- The match was played at Wembley Stadium.
- Event: 2016–17 FA Cup
Arsenal	Chelsea
2	1
- Date: 27 May 2017
- Venue: Wembley Stadium, London
- Man of the Match: Alexis Sánchez (Arsenal)
- Referee: Anthony Taylor (Cheshire)
- Attendance: 89,472
- Weather: Scattered clouds 20 °C (68 °F)

The 2017 FA Cup final was an association football match between London rivals Arsenal and Chelsea on 27 May 2017 at Wembley Stadium in London, England. It was the 136th FA Cup final overall of English football's primary cup competition, the Football Association Challenge Cup (FA Cup), organised by the Football Association (FA). This was a rematch of the 2002 FA Cup Final and the first final since 2003 in which the sides had won once in the Premier League against one another, with a 3–0 victory for Arsenal in September 2016, and a 3–1 win for Chelsea the following February. The game was broadcast live in the United Kingdom by both BBC and BT Sport. BBC One provided the free-to-air coverage and BT Sport 2 was the pay-TV alternative.

The match was refereed by Anthony Taylor in front of a crowd of 89,472. Arsenal kicked off and dominated the early stages, opening the scoring with a controversial goal from Alexis Sánchez in the fourth minute. On 68 minutes, Victor Moses fell in the Arsenal penalty area under pressure and appealed for a penalty but instead was shown his second yellow card by the referee for diving and was sent off. In the 76th minute, Diego Costa scored for Chelsea to level the score at 1–1: he received the ball from Willian and struck the ball past David Ospina, the Arsenal goalkeeper. Two minutes later Aaron Ramsey scored with a header past Chelsea goalkeeper Thibaut Courtois after a cross from Olivier Giroud, who had come on as a substitute less than a minute earlier, to make it 2–1 to Arsenal. After four minutes of stoppage time, the whistle was blown and Arsenal won the FA Cup final 2–1, to secure a record-breaking 13th title, while Arsène Wenger became the most successful manager in the tournament's history with seven wins.

Winning the FA Cup would have meant Arsenal qualified for the 2017–18 UEFA Europa League group stage had they not already secured their place in the competition after finishing fifth in the 2016–17 Premier League. They also earned the right to play Chelsea who were the Premier League champions for the 2017 FA Community Shield.

== Route to the final ==
=== Arsenal ===
Route to the final for Arsenal
Round	Opposition	Score
3rd	Preston North End (A)	2–1
4th	Southampton (A)	5–0
5th	Sutton United (A)	2–0
QF	Lincoln City (H)	5–0
SF	Manchester City (N)	2–1 (a.e.t.)
Key: (H) = Home venue; (A) = Away venue; (N) = Neutral venue

As a Premier League team, Arsenal started their campaign in the third round and were drawn away at EFL Championship club Preston North End. At Deepdale, Callum Robinson put Preston ahead from close range in the seventh minute to give the home side a 1–0 lead at half-time. A minute after the interval, Aaron Ramsey equalised with a powerful shot from the edge of the Preston penalty area before Olivier Giroud's deflected strike gave Arsenal a 2–1 victory. In the fourth round, they faced fellow Premier League side Southampton away from home at St Mary's Stadium. Danny Welbeck scored twice before the midway point of the first half before crossing to Theo Walcott to score from close range to make it 3–0 at half-time. Walcott completed his hat-trick in the second half, with two assists from Alexis Sánchez, and Arsenal won 5–0.

In the fifth round, Arsenal were drawn away against non-League side Sutton United of the National League who were 105 places below them in the English football league system. At Sutton's Gander Green Lane, Arsenal won 2–0 with goals from Lucas Pérez and Walcott either side of half-time. The match was also noted for Sutton United's reserve goalkeeper Wayne Shaw being investigated by the Football Association and Gambling Commission: he had eaten a pie pitchside and admitted after the match that he had known that a betting company had offered odds on him doing so. In the quarter-final, Arsenal were drawn at home at the Emirates Stadium against National League club Lincoln City. Walcott gave Arsenal a one-goal lead in first-half stoppage time before second-half goals from Giroud, Sánchez and Ramsey, and an own goal by Luke Waterfall, gave the home side a 5–0 victory. In the semi-final which took place at Wembley Stadium as a neutral venue, they played against fellow Premier League team Manchester City. After a goalless first half, Sergio Agüero put Manchester City ahead on the hour mark before Nacho Monreal scored the equaliser with a volley from Alex Oxlade-Chamberlain's cross. The match ended 1–1 in regular time and went into extra time. In the 101st minute, Sánchez scored from close range to put Arsenal ahead, a lead which they kept for a 2–1 win and progression to the final.

=== Chelsea ===
Route to the final for Chelsea
Round	Opposition	Score
3rd	Peterborough United (H)	4–1
4th	Brentford (H)	4–0
5th	Wolverhampton Wanderers (A)	2–0
QF	Manchester United (H)	1–0
SF	Tottenham Hotspur (N)	4–2
Key: (H) = Home venue; (A) = Away venue; (N) = Neutral venue

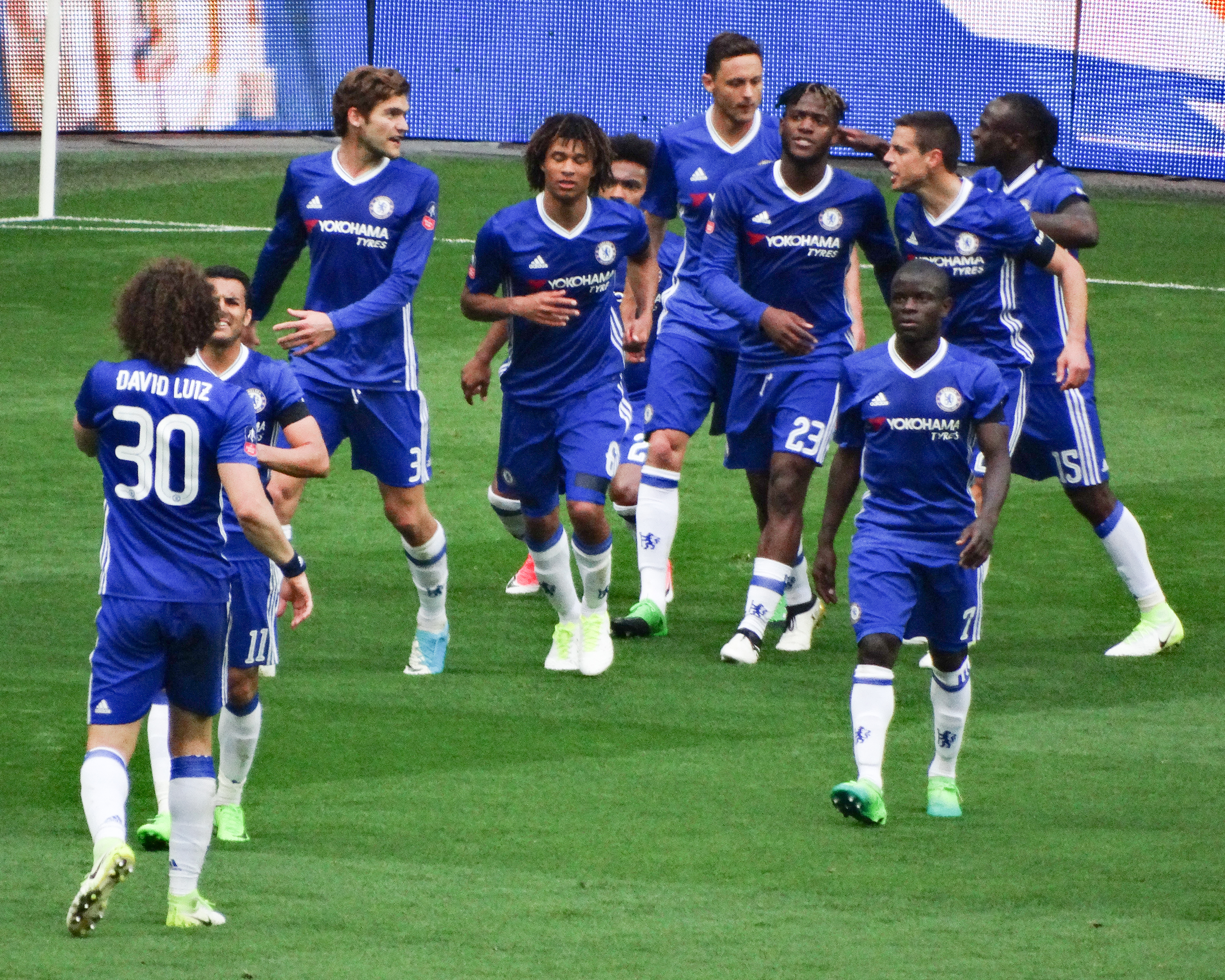
Chelsea players celebrating a goal in the semi-final match against Tottenham Hotspur

Chelsea also started their FA Cup campaign in the third round where they were drawn at home at Stamford Bridge against League One side Peterborough United. The home side took the lead through Pedro, and Michy Batshuayi doubled their advantage before half-time. Willian made it 3–0 seven minutes after the interval before John Terry was sent off for a foul on Lee Angol. Three minutes later, Tom Nichols scored for Peterborough but Pedro scored with 15 minutes to go to make the final score 4–1. In the fourth round, they were drawn against Championship team Brentford at home. Goals from Willian and Pedro made it 2–0 after 21 minutes, before Branislav Ivanović's goal on the break and a penalty from Batshuayi gave Chelsea a 4–0 victory.

In the fifth round, Chelsea faced Championship side Wolverhampton Wanderers away at Molineux. After a goalless first half, Pedro gave Chelsea the lead with a header midway through the second before Diego Costa secured a 2–0 win with a low strike in the 89th minute. In the quarter-final, Chelsea were drawn at home against fellow Premier League side and FA Cup holders Manchester United. Ander Herrera was sent off for Manchester United in the 35th minute for a second yellow card before N'Golo Kanté scored the game's solitary goal early in the second half with a low driven shot which beat David de Gea. In the semi-final at Wembley Stadium, Chelsea took on Tottenham Hotspur, their London rivals. Willian gave Chelsea the lead in the fifth minute with a free kick before Harry Kane equalised with a low header. Son Heung-min was adjudged to have fouled on Victor Moses on 43 minutes and Willian converted the subsequent penalty to give Chelsea a 2–1 half-time lead. Dele Alli equalised from a Christian Eriksen pass early in the second half but strikes from Eden Hazard and Nemanja Matić secured a 4–2 win for Chelsea and qualification for the final.

== Pre-match ==
Arsenal were appearing in the FA Cup final for the 20th time, and for the third time in four years. They had won the cup twelve times, and were beaten finalists seven times; most recently in 2001. (Note: Arsenal had won the FA Cup in 1930, 1936, 1950, 1971, 1979, 1993, 1998, 2002, 2003, 2005, 2014 and 2015.) By comparison, Chelsea were making their 12th appearance in a FA Cup final. The club won the cup seven times and lost four finals. (Note: Chelsea had won the FA Cup in 1970, 1997, 2000, 2007, 2009, 2010 and 2012.) The clubs had previously met 13 times in the FA Cup. Arsenal held an advantage in those meetings, winning seven of the last eight; Chelsea won the last FA Cup tie, a 2–1 victory in April 2009. This was the second FA Cup final to feature both sides; the first was won by Arsenal in 2002.

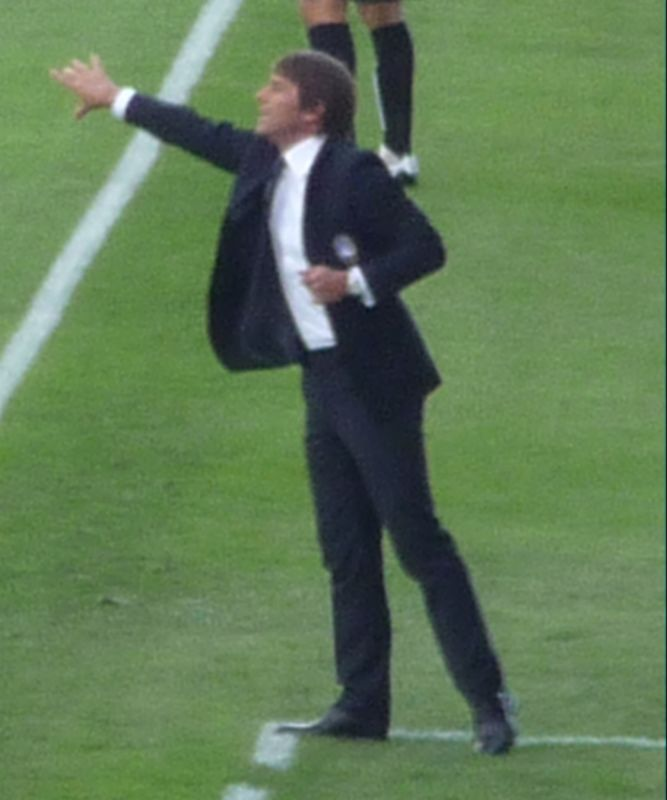
Chelsea manager Antonio Conte was on course to win the domestic double in his first season at the club.

The most recent meeting between the two teams was a league encounter in February 2017, Chelsea winning by three goals to one, a result which moved them 12 points clear in first position. The victory was significant given that Chelsea had lost the reverse fixture 3–0 in September 2016, in what BBC journalist Phil McNulty described as a "watershed moment" in their season. While Arsenal struggled to build momentum throughout autumn and winter, Chelsea manager Antonio Conte's tactical switch from 4–3–3 to 3–4–3 thereafter resulted in a 13-match winning run. They won the Premier League with two matches to spare, and later set a new divisional record for the most wins (30). Arsenal ended the season in fifth place, their lowest placing under manager Arsène Wenger, missing out on UEFA Champions League football for the first time in 20 years. Wenger's future had been cast into doubt following a bad run of form in February and March, which included the team losing 10–2 on aggregate against Bayern Munich in the Champions League, the worst aggregate performance by an English club in the history of the tournament.

To arrest the decline, Wenger adopted a similar tactical change to Conte, playing three defenders at the back. Arsenal went on to win eight of their last nine fixtures, but Wenger suggested his team were not favourites: "it's quite even or maybe Chelsea are ahead, so it's a bit similar to what happened in the semi-final against Manchester City. That's part of what makes it all exciting as well." Of his future he said, "It will not be my last match anyway, because I will stay, no matter what happens, in football." Former Arsenal player Paul Merson's evaluation was, "Mertesacker is going to be crucial for Arsenal if he plays; he will have to play very well if Arsenal are to have any chance. If he doesn't play well then Chelsea are going to cut through Arsenal like a knife through butter."

Conte described Wenger as one of the "greats" in football, and felt he would remain as Arsenal manager come the season's end. "He has done a fantastic job. Sometimes in England I think you undervalue the achievement of qualifying for the Champions League. Only this season they haven't qualified for the Champions League," he continued. Conte reiterated the importance of his players keeping their focus and wanted Chelsea to "pay great attention and focus" to their opponents. Hazard, who was playing in his first FA Cup final, was eager to win the competition: "For Chelsea, for such a big club like this, you need to win one, two, three trophies every season if you can. Now we have the possibility to win another trophy so all the players are ready for that. It's such a great competition for the fans."

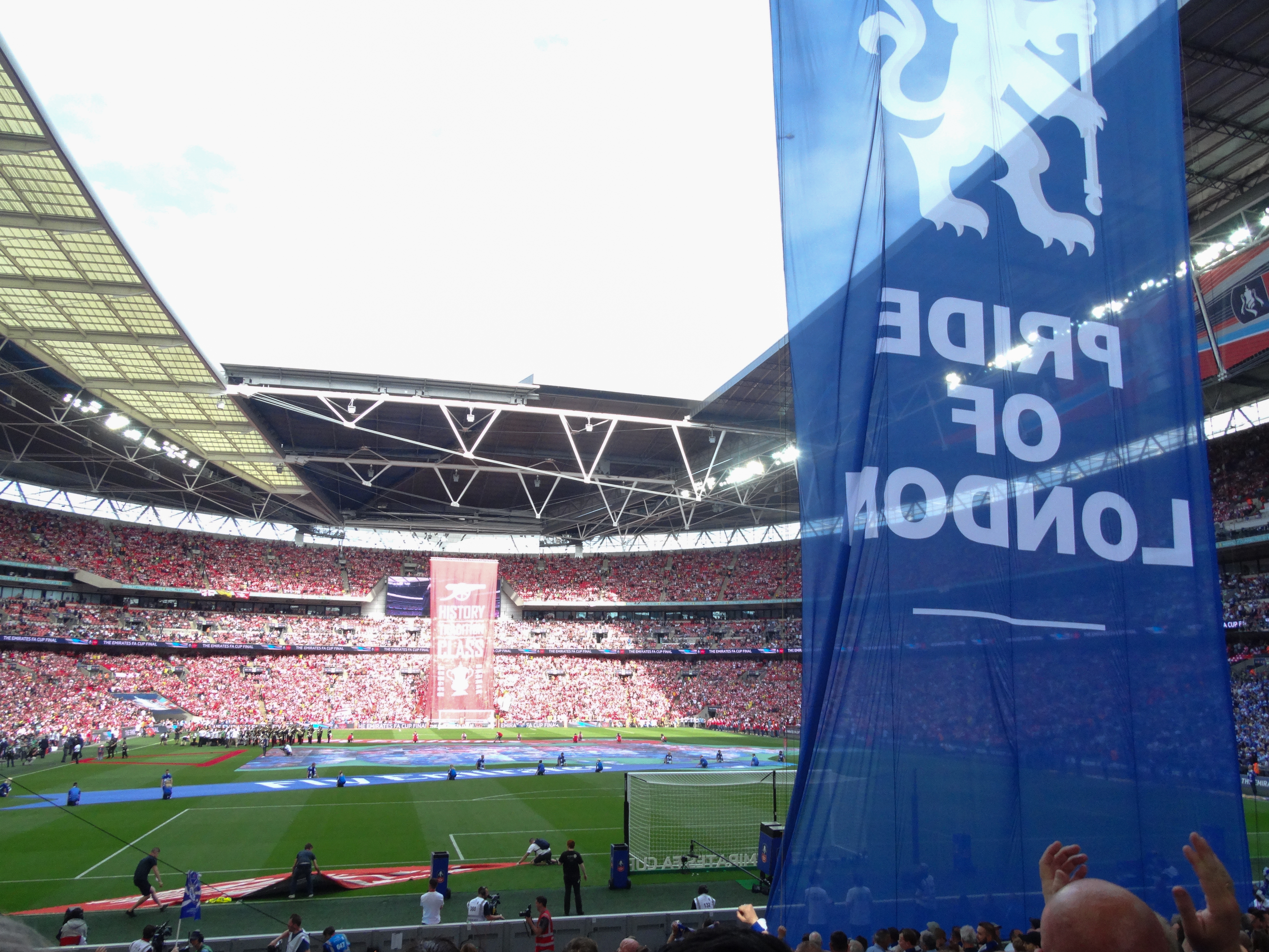
Banners and stadium before the game

While Chelsea had no injury or suspension worries, Arsenal had doubts over the fitness of Petr Čech and Shkodran Mustafi, and were already without defenders Laurent Koscielny (suspension) and Gabriel (ankle injury). Per Mertesacker was expected to start; the Germany international only featured once for Arsenal's first team during the season. The day before the final The Guardian reported that Wenger chose David Ospina to start in goal ahead of Čech.

Both clubs received an allocation of approximately 28,000 tickets. For adults, these were priced £45, £65, £85 and £115, with concessions in place. Chelsea supporters were situated in the west side of the ground, while Arsenal's were allocated in the east. The remaining 14,000 tickets were distributed to what the FA described as the "football family which includes volunteers representing counties, leagues, local clubs and charities". The losing finalist would receive £1.6 million in total prize money while the winners earned a total of £3.4 million. Security at Wembley Stadium was tightened in the wake of the Manchester Arena bombing and Arsenal cancelled a screening of the game at their ground. Both clubs cancelled plans for open top bus victory parades.

The game was broadcast live in the United Kingdom by both BBC and BT Sport. BBC One provided the free-to-air coverage and BT Sport 2 was the pay-TV alternative. It was the first time in the history of the FA Cup that a spidercam was utilised during the match.

Sol Campbell and Eddie Newton came onto the pitch to greet the supporters and place the trophy on a plinth. As they departed, the traditional Cup Final hymn, "Abide with Me" was sung by representatives of eight clubs, including Lincoln City, Guernsey, Millwall and Sutton United. The teams emerged moments later led by their managers, and players were greeted by Prince William, Duke of Cambridge. Soprano Emily Haig sang the national anthem and a minute's silence was then held to honour the victims of the Manchester attack. Prince William, Manchester Mayor Andy Burnham, Culture Secretary Karen Bradley and FA chairman Greg Clarke laid wreaths on the pitch in tribute.

== Match ==
=== Summary ===
==== First half ====
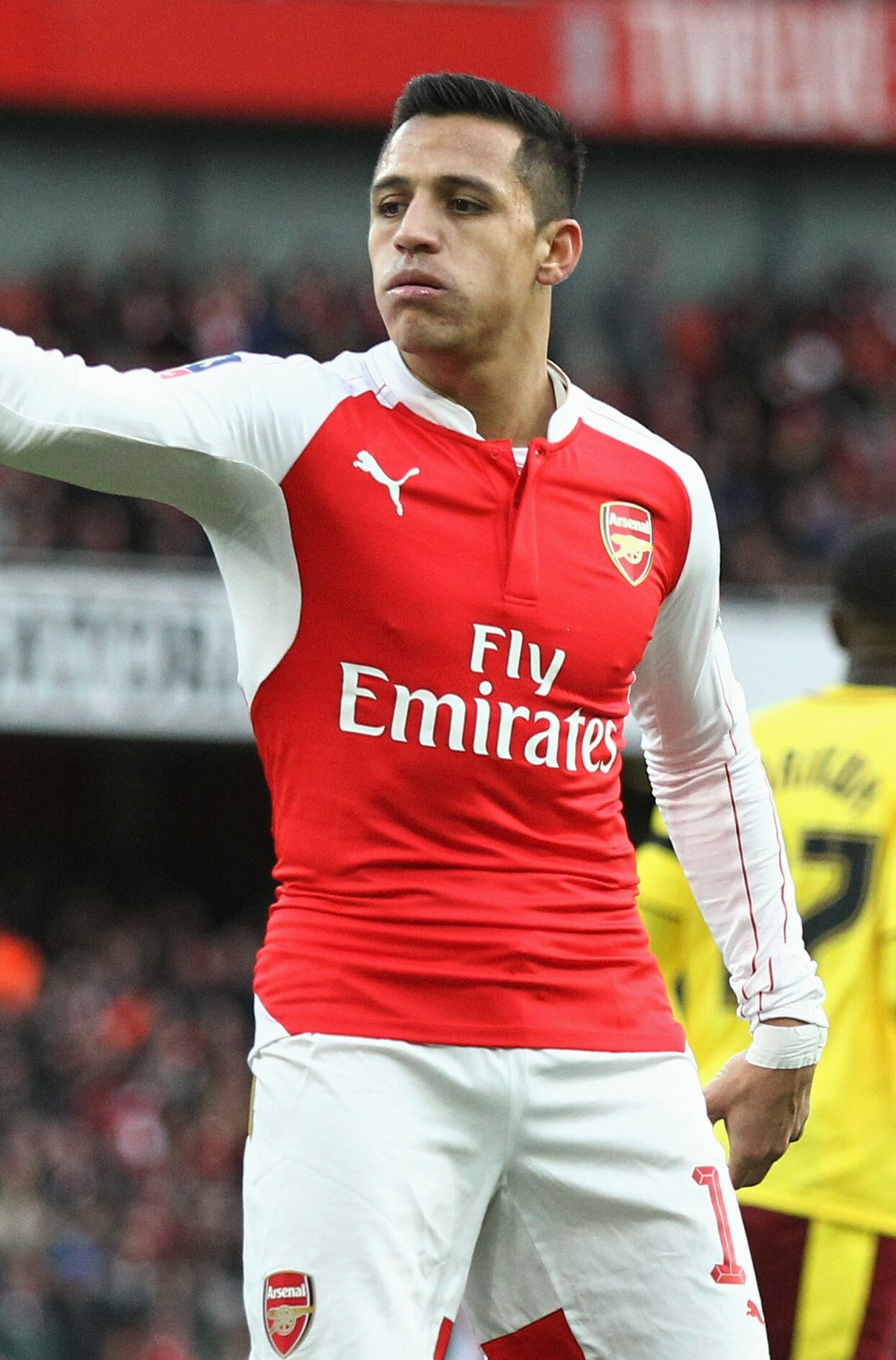
Alexis Sánchez (pictured in 2016) scored Arsenal's opening goal.

Arsenal kicked off the match around 5:30 p.m. on 27 May 2017 at Wembley Stadium in front of 89,472 spectators. Chelsea lined up as a 3–4–3 formation with Pedro, Costa and Hazard in attack, while Arsenal adopted a 3–4–2–1 with Welbeck up front. Arsenal dominated the early stages of the match and opened the scoring with a goal from Sánchez in the fourth minute, shooting past the advancing goalkeeper from 6 yards (5.5 m) out with his right foot. The goal was initially flagged as offside as Ramsey was adjudged as being in an offside position. After discussion with his assistant referee, the overrode the decision and awarded Arsenal the goal due to Ramsey not attempting to play the ball. In the tenth minute, Ramsey was shown the first yellow card of the match. In the 15th minute, Sánchez struck from distance but his shot was high, before Costa's shot from around 14 yards (13 m) was blocked by Arsenal's defence. A minute later, Mesut Özil's side-footed shot was cleared off the line by Gary Cahill. On 19 minutes, Arsenal hit the frame of Chelsea's goal twice in quick succession: Welbeck's header struck the post and the ball rebounded on Ramsey's chest from where it hit the post once more before going out.

Midway through the half, Hazard passed to Moses whose shot was blocked before Mertesacker stopped Costa's shot. On 29 minutes, a quick break from Arsenal ended with Welbeck opting to shoot from a narrow angle and Cahill making another goal-line clearance. Three minutes later, Sánchez's floated free kick fell to Granit Xhaka whose strike from distance was saved by Thibaut Courtois, the Chelsea goalkeeper. With six minutes of the half remaining, Pedro's shot from the edge of the Arsenal penalty area went over the crossbar. Early in stoppage time, Monreal fouled Pedro near the box but Alonso's free kick was off-target and the half ended 1–0.

==== Second half ====
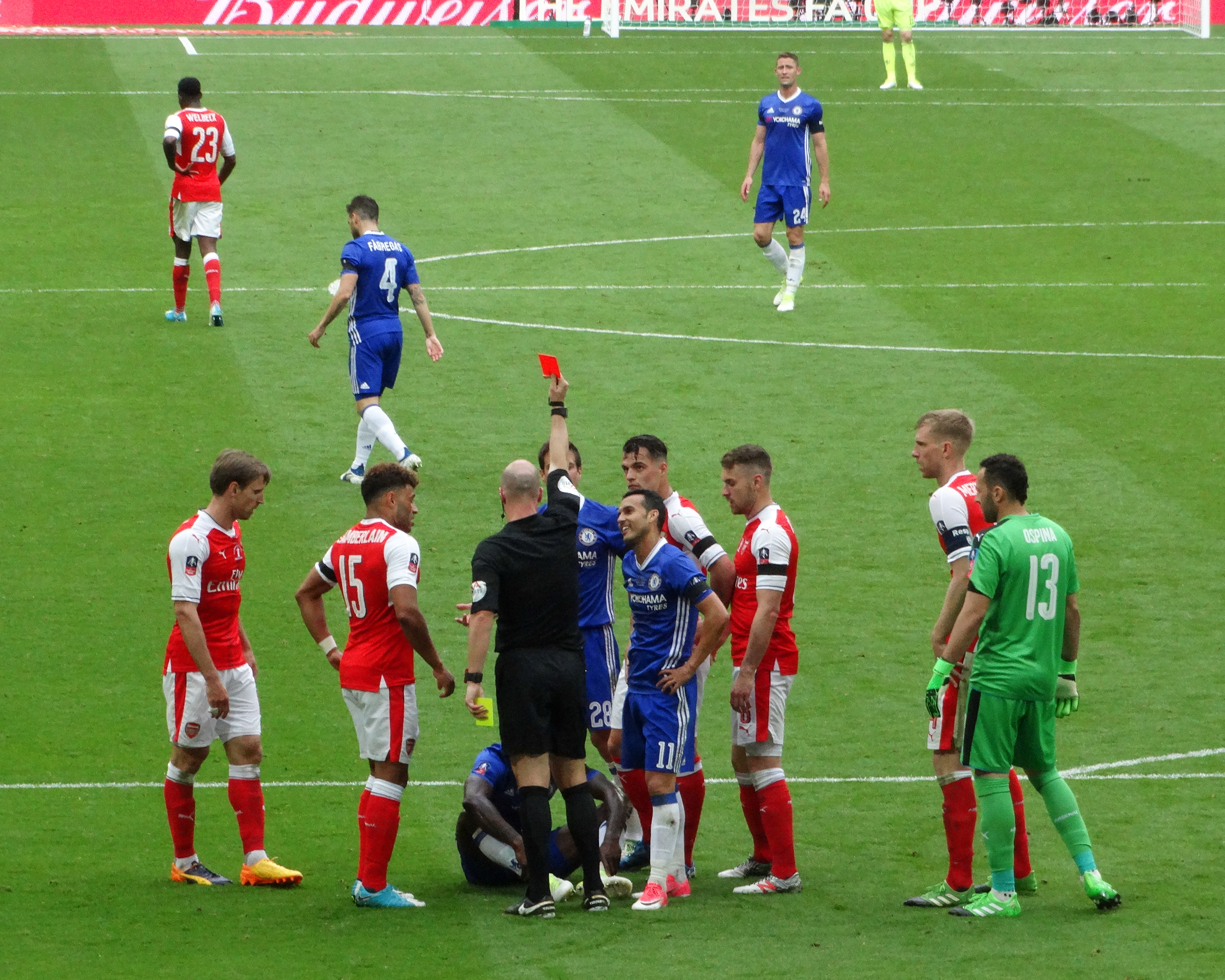
Moses receiving a red card in the second half

Neither side made any changes to their personnel during the interval and the second half kicked off with neither side dominating. Four minutes in, Pedro's shot was blocked by Mertesacker before Kanté's powerful shot was caught by Ospina in the Arsenal goal. Costa's attempt was then blocked by Mertesacker before Moses was kept out by Arsenal's defence. In the 54th minute, Rob Holding was booked for bringing Costa down on the edge of the Arsenal penalty area: Pedro's subsequent free kick was headed clear by Mertesacker. Two minutes later Moses was shown the yellow card for a foul on Welbeck before Kanté was booked for illegally blocking Ramsey. In the 61st minute, Chelsea made the first substitution of the match when Matić was replaced by former Arsenal midfielder Cesc Fàbregas. Héctor Bellerín then took possession of the ball on the edge of the Chelsea penalty area after a run down the left wing by Welbeck, but his low shot was saved by Courtois diving to his left. On 68 minutes, Moses fell in the Arsenal area while close to Monreal and appealed for a penalty but instead was shown his second yellow card by the referee for diving and was sent off. With 18 minutes of the game remaining, Chelsea made their second change with Willian coming on for Pedro.

In the 76th minute, Costa scored for Chelsea to level the score at 1–1: he received the ball from Willian, chested it down and struck the ball past Ospina. Giroud then came on for Welbeck, and 38 seconds later Arsenal re-took the lead: Ramsey headed the ball past Courtois after a cross from Giroud to make it 2–1. With ten minutes remaining, David Luiz headed Willian's free kick into the side netting. Arsenal's Oxlade-Chamberlain was then replaced by Francis Coquelin who was booked within a minute for a foul. On 85 minutes, Bellerín received the ball on the halfway line and ran at Luiz, beating him before shooting wide of the Chelsea goal. Costa's strike then hit Ospina squarely in the chest from close range. Batshuayi came on in the 88th minute to replace Costa before Özil side-footed shot struck the Chelsea goal-post. Three minutes into injury time, Arsenal brought on Mohamed Elneny to replace Sánchez. After one further minute of stoppage time, the whistle was blown and Arsenal won the FA Cup final 2–1.

=== Details ===
27 May 2017
17:30 BST

Arsenal	2–1	Chelsea
Sánchez 4'; Ramsey 79'	Report	Costa 76'

Wembley Stadium, London
Attendance: 89,472
Referee: Anthony Taylor (Cheshire)

Arsenal	Chelsea

GK	13	(Colombia) David Ospina
CB	16	(England) Rob Holding	(yellow card) 53'
CB	4	(Germany) Per Mertesacker (c)
CB	18	(Spain) Nacho Monreal
RM	24	(Spain) Héctor Bellerín
CM	8	(Wales) Aaron Ramsey	(yellow card) 9'
CM	29	(Switzerland) Granit Xhaka	(yellow card) 81'
LM	15	(England) Alex Oxlade-Chamberlain		(substituted off) 82'
RW	11	(Germany) Mesut Özil
CF	23	(England) Danny Welbeck		(substituted off) 78'
LW	7	(Chile) Alexis Sánchez		(substituted off) 90+3'
Substitutes:
GK	33	(Czech Republic) Petr Čech
MF	34	(France) Francis Coquelin	(yellow card) 83'	(substituted on) 82'
MF	35	(Egypt) Mohamed Elneny		(substituted on) 90+3'
FW	9	(Spain) Lucas Pérez
FW	12	(France) Olivier Giroud		(substituted on) 78'
FW	14	(England) Theo Walcott
FW	17	(Nigeria) Alex Iwobi
Manager:
(France) Arsène Wenger

GK	13	(Belgium) Thibaut Courtois
CB	28	(Spain) César Azpilicueta
CB	30	(Brazil) David Luiz
CB	24	(England) Gary Cahill (c)
RM	15	(Nigeria) Victor Moses	(yellow card) 57' (yellow-red card) 68'
CM	7	(France) N'Golo Kanté	(yellow card) 59'
CM	21	(Serbia) Nemanja Matić		(substituted off) 61'
LM	3	(Spain) Marcos Alonso
RW	11	(Spain) Pedro		(substituted off) 72'
CF	19	(Spain) Diego Costa		(substituted off) 88'
LW	10	(Belgium) Eden Hazard
Substitutes:
GK	1	(Bosnia and Herzegovina) Asmir Begović
DF	5	(France) Kurt Zouma
DF	6	(Netherlands) Nathan Aké
DF	26	(England) John Terry
MF	4	(Spain) Cesc Fàbregas		(substituted on) 61'
MF	22	(Brazil) Willian		(substituted on) 72'
FW	23	(Belgium) Michy Batshuayi		(substituted on) 88'
Head coach:
(Italy) Antonio Conte

Man of the Match:
Alexis Sánchez (Arsenal)

Assistant referees:
Gary Beswick (Durham)
Marc Perry (West Midlands)
Fourth official:
Bobby Madley (West Yorkshire)
Fifth official:
Adam Nunn (Wiltshire)

Match rules

- 90 minutes.
- 30 minutes of extra time if necessary.
- Penalty shoot-out if scores still level.
- Seven named substitutes.
- Maximum of three substitutions, with a fourth allowed in extra time.

Statistics
Statistic	Arsenal	Chelsea
Goals scored	2	1
Possession	52.4%	47.6%
Shots on target	6	5
Shots off target	7	7
Corner kicks	7	5
Offsides	0	0
Yellow cards	4	1
Red cards	0	1

== Post-match ==
Winning the game secured a record 13th title for Arsenal, while Wenger became the most successful manager in the tournament's history with seven wins. Although winning the FA Cup would have secured a 2017–18 UEFA Europa League group stage qualification, Arsenal had already qualified for the competition with a fifth-placed finish in the 2016–17 Premier League, which saw them fail to qualify for the 2017–18 UEFA Champions League. Due to the circumstances surrounding Mertesacker's appearance, and performance on the day, some Arsenal fans and former players have dubbed the game The Mertesacker Final.

Welbeck praised his team but refused to be drawn on Wenger's future, saying "It was a great team performance ... The manager is his own man and he makes his own decision and the board will make the right decision so I can't comment on that." Wenger himself focused on his team's display: "We had an outstanding performance from the first minute onwards. This team has suffered. They've united and responded." Chelsea goalkeeper Courtois refused to blame Moses for the defeat: "We are obviously disappointed but I want to say congratulations to Arsenal. They played a good game ... we went down to 10 men and the red card was correct. Victor Moses doesn't need to apologise." Losing manager Conte said he had been surprised by Arsenal and that his side had started poorly: "Arsenal started very well with great determination. They surprised us a bit but I repeat our first 25 minutes weren't good ... Our season was incredible to win the league in this way, it was great but now its important to look forward and to restart."

== See also ==
- Arsenal F.C.–Chelsea F.C. rivalry
