= Aaron Ramsey =

Welsh former footballer (born 1990)

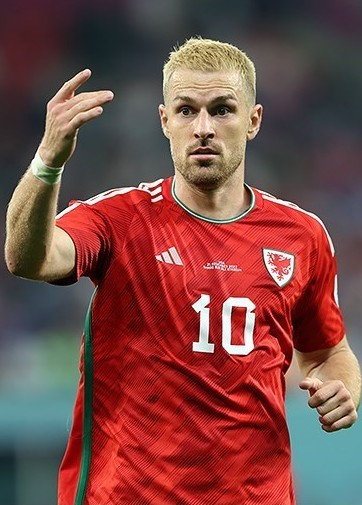
- Ramsey with Wales at the 2022 FIFA World Cup

Personal information
- Full name: Aaron James Ramsey
- Date of birth: 26 December 1990 (age 35)
- Place of birth: Caerphilly, Wales
- Height: 5 ft 10 in (1.78 m)
- Position: Midfielder

Team information
- Current team: Oxford United (head coach)

Youth career
- 1999–2006: Cardiff City

Senior career*
Years	Team	Apps	(Gls)
2006–2008	Cardiff City	16	(1)
2008–2019	Arsenal	262	(40)
2010–2011	→ Nottingham Forest (loan)	5	(0)
2011	→ Cardiff City (loan)	6	(1)
2019–2022	Juventus	49	(5)
2022	→ Rangers (loan)	7	(2)
2022–2023	Nice	27	(1)
2023–2025	Cardiff City	21	(3)
2025	Pumas UNAM	6	(1)
Total		399	(54)

International career
2005–2008	Wales U17	15	(2)
2007–2009	Wales U21	12	(2)
2008–2024	Wales	86	(21)
2012	Great Britain Olympic	5	(1)

Managerial career
- 2025: Cardiff City (caretaker)
- 2026–: Oxford United
Medal record
Men's football
Representing Wales (as player)
UEFA European Championship
Bronze medal – third place	2016 France
- * Club domestic league appearances and goals

Aaron James Ramsey (born 26 December 1990) is a Welsh professional football manager and former player who is head coach of EFL League One club Oxford United. He manly played as a box-to-box midfielder, but had also been deployed on the left and right wings.

Ramsey played as a schoolboy for Cardiff City, where he spent eight years in youth football, became the club's youngest ever first team player, and made 28 appearances (including loan spell) for the senior team – including the 2008 FA Cup final. Ramsey moved to Arsenal in 2008 in a £5 million deal, where he quickly gained first-team experience. However, his career stalled significantly after he suffered a broken leg in a match against Stoke City in February 2010. After two loan spells away from Arsenal, he returned to full fitness and re-established himself as a regular starter during the 2011–12 season. Ramsey was a key player for Arsenal in the 2013–14 campaign, scoring 16 goals in all competitions, including the winner in the 2014 FA Cup final against Hull City. He also played in the 2015 FA Cup final, which Arsenal won, and scored a second FA Cup-winning goal in 2017. In 2019, he joined Juventus, winning the league title during his first season. He later played for Rangers, Nice, Cardiff City (including a brief stint as caretaker manager), before ultimately ending his career at UNAM.

Ramsey made his full international debut for the Wales national team in 2008 and was part of their UEFA Euro 2016 campaign, where he helped his country to the semi-finals and was included in the Team of the Tournament. He was instrumental in securing qualification for Euro 2020, the country's second successive European tournament, where Wales were eliminated in the round of 16. Ramsey was also a member of the squad that qualified for the 2022 FIFA World Cup, becoming the first Wales team to qualify for a World Cup since 1958, which he described as a "dream come true". He was captain of the national team from 2011 to 2012, and again from 2023 to 2024. He also represented Great Britain at the 2012 Summer Olympics.

== Early life ==
As a child, Ramsey attended Ysgol Gyfun Cwm Rhymni (Rhymney Valley Comprehensive School) in Caerphilly County Borough. Ramsey's first introduction to football was at the age of nine, when he attended an Urdd training session at Caerphilly. Before turning to football, he was a keen rugby player and athlete. As a schoolboy, he played as a winger for Caerphilly RFC's youth development programme, where he was approached by scouts from rugby league side St. Helens after playing in a youth match against them, but had already been signed by Cardiff City's youth academy. Ramsey was Welsh Schools' Athletic Association pentathlon champion in 2005 and was ranked 4th in Great Britain in the under 17 age group in 2006.

He lived with his parents, Marlene and Kevin, and his brother, Josh, until moving to London where he was housemates with former Cardiff City teammate, Chris Gunter, who was then playing for Tottenham Hotspur. Ramsey is a fluent Welsh language speaker.

== Club career ==
=== Cardiff City ===
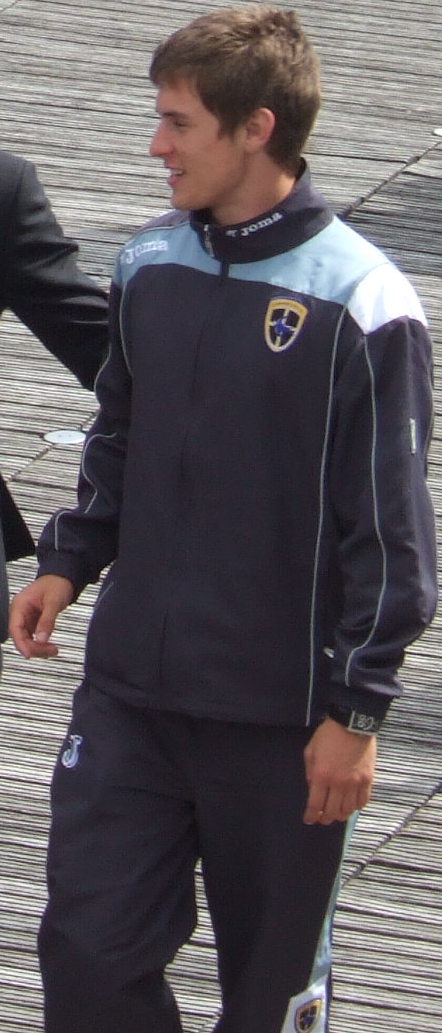
Ramsey with Cardiff City in 2008

After impressing in an Urdd tournament as a youngster he signed for Cardiff City, who fended off competition from Newcastle United, as a schoolboy at the age of eight, working his way through the club's youth system. After a few more years he eventually made his debut in the last home game of the 2006–07 Championship season, coming on to replace Paul Parry in the final minute of the 1–0 defeat to Hull City on 28 April 2007. In doing so, Ramsey became the youngest player to ever play for Cardiff City, aged just 16 years and 124 days, beating the previous record holder John Toshack. In June 2007, Cardiff turned down a bid of over £1 million for Ramsey from a London-based Premier League club. The club was not named, but it was widely believed that they continued to watch Ramsey at every available opportunity during the 2007–08 season. Cardiff also turned down a £1 million offer, although the deal was to start with a payment of £200,000 and rise depending on his future achievements, from Everton.

Ramsey made his first league appearance of the 2007–08 season on 6 October, when he came on as a late substitute for Jimmy Floyd Hasselbaink in the 2–1 home win over Burnley. Ramsey signed his first professional contract in December 2007 and went on to make his first full professional start for Cardiff on 5 January in the FA Cup against Chasetown replacing the suspended Stephen McPhail. An impressive performance from Ramsey saw him head in the second Cardiff goal as they went on to win 3–1. Due to his performance against Chasetown, Ramsey was nominated for the Player of the Round award, eventually losing out to Coventry City's Michael Mifsud. On 26 April, he scored his first league goal in a 3–3 draw against Burnley. He went on to make his first career league start three weeks later in a 3–1 win over Queens Park Rangers and began to establish himself in the first team, making several more starts in the Cardiff side. He made a total of 22 appearances during the season, his first full season of professional football, and played in five of the club's six FA Cup matches, including the final, becoming the second youngest player to play in an FA Cup final after Curtis Weston, who played in the 2004 FA Cup final for Millwall.

Following Ramsey's impressive performance in the 2–1 FA Cup quarter-final win over Middlesbrough it was revealed that Manchester United manager Sir Alex Ferguson had talked to Cardiff manager Dave Jones to inquire about Ramsey, who were later joined by Arsenal and Everton in following his progress. Ramsey in fact grew up a Manchester United fan, but in the end he decided not to join them. Cardiff chairman Peter Ridsdale told the BBC that Arsenal's bid of £5 million up front had been accepted. Arsenal's bid did not include a loan clause that would allow Ramsey to stay at Cardiff for another season. Cardiff assistant manager and former Arsenal player and coach Terry Burton, who was credited for having brought through Ramsey, also helped recommend him to Arsenal manager Arsène Wenger, having retained a longstanding connection to the club. During the transfer negotiations, Burton also advised that Ramsey join Arsenal, citing the similarity between the player and the club's overall style of play.

=== Arsenal ===
On 10 June 2008, it was confirmed that after meeting officials from Arsenal, Everton and Manchester United, Ramsey had decided to join Arsenal, who paid Cardiff City a total of £4.8 million for the player. The move was completed on 13 June 2008 on what was said to be a long-term contract. The main reason he chose Arsenal ahead of the other clubs that pursued his signature was the approach of Arsenal manager Arsène Wenger, who flew him and his family to Switzerland to talk about the plans Wenger had for him and his potential future with Arsenal. Wenger described Ramsey as "a player with a fantastic engine, good build, good technique and good vision".

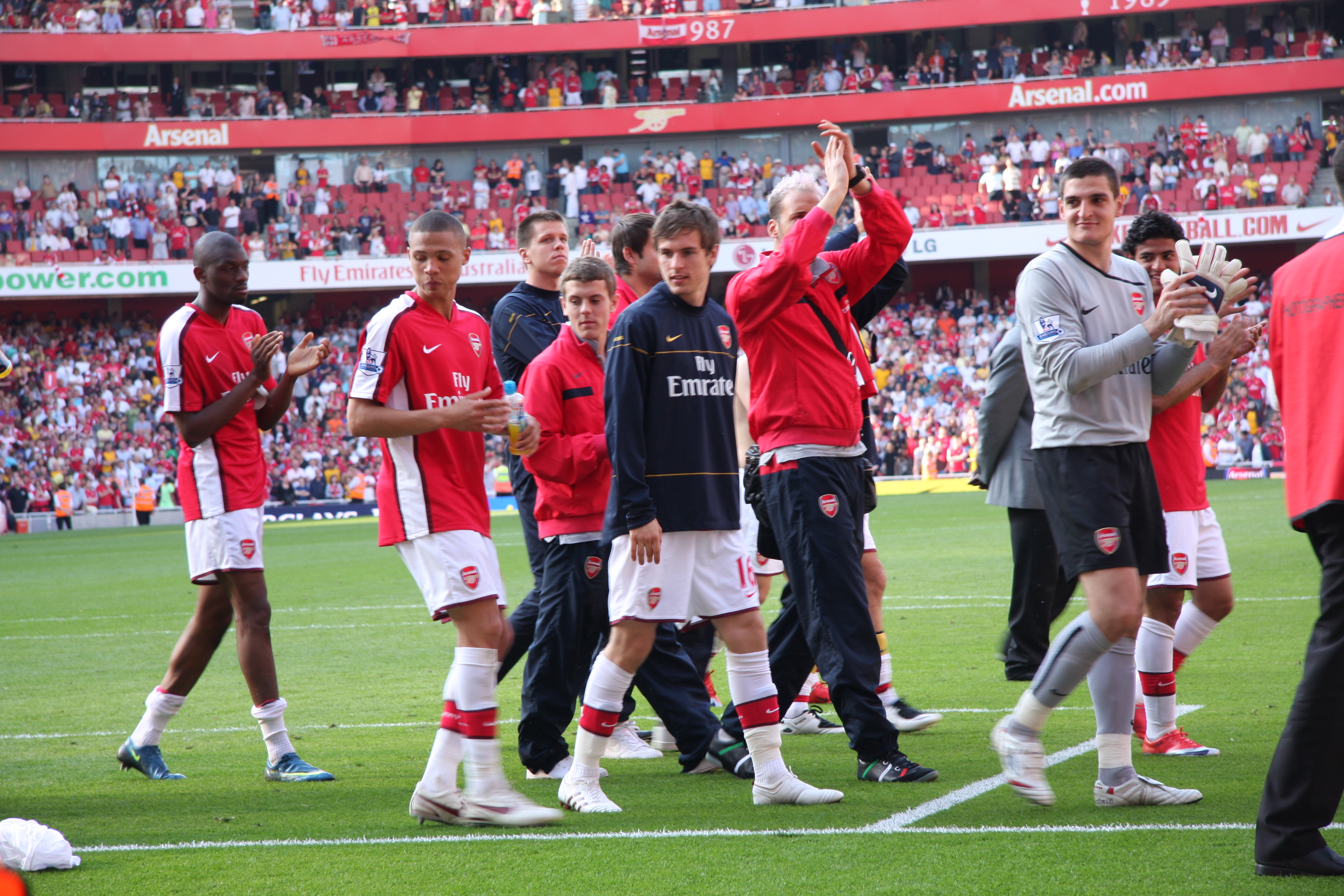
Ramsey (in dark blue) with Arsenal in 2009

Ramsey made his competitive debut for Arsenal in the Champions League third qualifying round against FC Twente on 13 August 2008 and his league debut a month later against Blackburn Rovers on 13 September 2008, marking it with an assist to Emmanuel Adebayor for Arsenal's fourth and Adebayor's third. On 23 September 2008 he completed 90 minutes in Arsenal's third round League Cup game against Sheffield United which Arsenal won 6–0, when he added two more assists to his season's tally, setting up Nicklas Bendtner and Carlos Vela. He scored his first goal for the club in their 5–2 victory away against Fenerbahçe in the group stages of the UEFA Champions League by shooting a long-range shot which hit the post and went in, becoming the fifth youngest scorer in Champions League history, and only the second player born in the 1990s to score a Champions League goal. Ramsey was named amongst a host of young players poised to shine in 2009 by Fifa.com. On 1 July 2009, he signed a new long-term contract at Arsenal.

On 22 August 2009, Ramsey scored his first league goal in a one-on-one against goalkeeper David James as Arsenal beat Portsmouth 4–1 at Emirates Stadium and then set up Andrey Arshavin in a 3–1 home win over Celtic in the Champions League play-offs. In the League Cup fourth round win against Liverpool, on 28 October, he produced an impressive performance and set up Nicklas Bendtner earning himself the man of the match award.

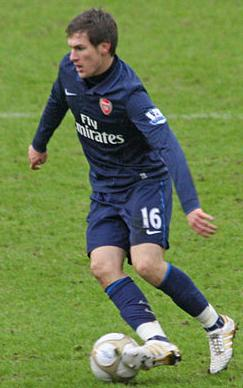
Ramsey playing for Arsenal against Stoke City in 2010

Ramsey made his first Premier League start of the season on 7 November 2009 as Arsenal beat Wolverhampton Wanderers 4–1 at Molineux with Ramsey completing 90-minutes for the first time in the top-flight. Four days after the game, he was awarded the Welsh Young Player of the Year award. On 5 December 2009, Ramsey scored his second league goal of the season in a comfortable 2–0 victory over Stoke City. On 30 December, Ramsey went on to score his third goal of the season, along with an assist in the 4–1 victory against Portsmouth. On 3 January 2010, Ramsey scored a 78th-minute equaliser in the FA Cup third round tie against West Ham United at Upton Park. Arsenal went on to win the tie 2–1, with Eduardo scoring an 83rd-minute header. Ramsey went on to be named man of the match. Ramsey has been described by manager Arsène Wenger as: "An offence-minded Roy Keane" and "an all-round player, with a fantastic ability to cover distances."

On 27 February 2010, Arsenal played Stoke City at the Britannia Stadium, where a tackle by Stoke defender Ryan Shawcross caused a double fracture in Ramsey's lower right leg. Ramsey was hospitalised, and it was later confirmed that he had broken his tibia and fibula. No return date was initially given, but it was announced on 20 March that he started walking without his crutches. Ramsey signed a new long-term contract with Arsenal on 1 June 2010. He returned to training in October 2010. On 23 November 2010, Ramsey made his return to football for the Arsenal reserve team against the Wolverhampton Wanderers reserve team at Arsenal's London Colney training ground.

==== 2010–11: Loan to Nottingham Forest ====
Ramsey was loaned out to Nottingham Forest on 25 November 2010 until 3 January 2011. The move was to allow him to gain match fitness. Ramsey made his Forest debut on 29 November 2010 as a 61st-minute substitute against Leicester City. He made his first start against Derby County in the East Midlands derby, where he played 60 minutes. The match ended 5–2 to Nottingham Forest. Due to adverse weather conditions, Ramsey was limited to just five appearances for Forest before returning to Arsenal in January 2011. Ramsey returned to Arsenal on 5 January 2011 before the club's FA Cup tie against Leeds United, in which he was an unused substitute. Ramsey was also an unused substitute at Portman Road on 12 January for the League Cup semi-final against Ipswich Town.

==== 2011: Loan return to Cardiff City ====
The difference in his strength and his maturity – both on and off the pitch – was amazing. It really was a case of someone leaving as a boy and coming back as a man ... He is so strong mentally, and he certainly hasn't been holding anything back.

— Cardiff boss Dave Jones on Ramsey's loan return to the club

Ramsey returned to Cardiff City in a one-month loan move in order to gain match fitness, joining former Arsenal youngster Jay Emmanuel-Thomas who also joined the club on loan in January 2011. Ramsey was handed his first start for Cardiff against Reading. Ramsey again started for Cardiff in the South Wales derby against Swansea City where he provided an assist for Craig Bellamy in the game ending 1–0. Ramsey again completed 90 minutes for Cardiff in the game against Scunthorpe United and Burnley. A minor thigh strain ruled Ramsey out of the match against Nottingham Forest. He made his comeback against Leicester City, scoring in a 2–0 victory.

On 25 February, Cardiff asked for a loan extension until the end of the season with a 24-hour call back option; however, Arsenal turned this offer down and Ramsey returned to Arsenal.

==== 2011–2013: Injury return and development ====
Scoring the goal was a special moment for me. This was worth the wait and so many people have helped me through the tough time I had, hopefully this will give them the same satisfaction as it does me.

— Ramsey on his first goal of the 2010–11 season

Ramsey ended the season with seven league appearances. He made his Arsenal return as a 72nd-minute substitute against Manchester United in the FA Cup which Arsenal lost 2–0. He made his first start since his injury for Arsenal on 19 March against West Bromwich Albion. On 1 May, Ramsey scored his first goal of the season in a 1–0 home Premier League victory over Manchester United.

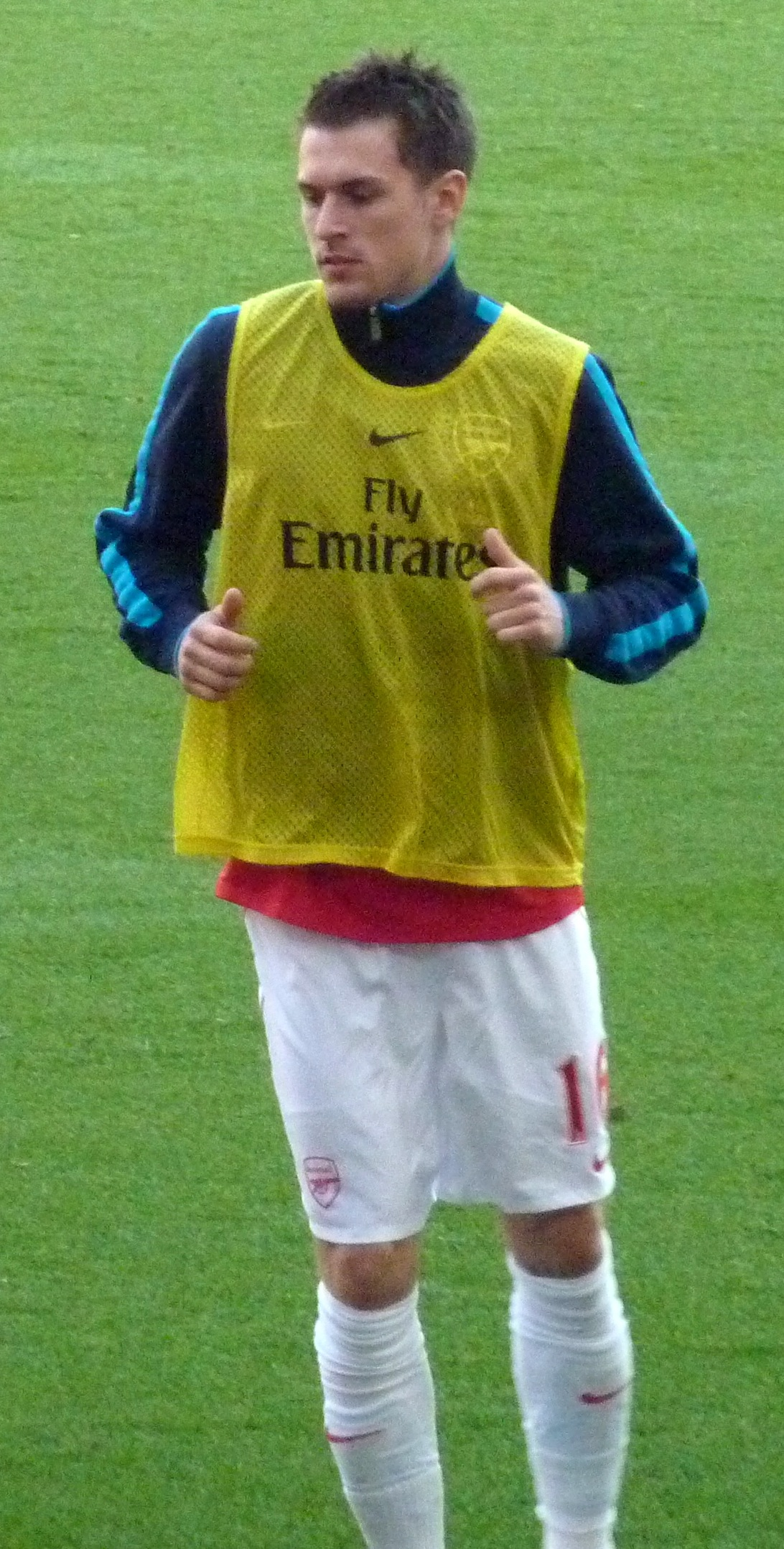
Ramsey warming up with Arsenal before a match against Aston Villa in 2012

On 16 August, Ramsey made his first Champions League appearance of the season at home against Udinese. In the fourth minute of the match, he assisted Theo Walcott's goal that gave Arsenal the 1–0 advantage in the first leg of the match. Four days later, he played a league game at the Emirates Stadium against Liverpool where on the 78th minute of play, Ignasi Miquel's attempted clearance hit Ramsey and looped into the back of the net past Wojciech Szczęsny for an own goal. The game finished 2–0 to Liverpool.

On 17 September, Ramsey provided the assist for Mikel Arteta as the team lost 4–3 away to Blackburn Rovers in a Premier League game. He was widely criticised for his performance lately for slowing down the tempo of the game and being indecisive in passing. However, he had a solid game during a convincing 3–0 Premier League win against Bolton Wanderers on 24 September. He provided an assist for the Arsenal captain Robin van Persie by a through ball in less than one minute after the half-time break. He made another important through pass to Walcott on the 54th minute that saw David Wheater sent off for pulling Walcott from the back.

On 19 October, he scored a dramatic last minute winner against Marseille in an important Champions League group stage match. On 23 October, Ramsey assisted Gervinho for the first goal in a 3–1 win over Stoke City. On 11 February 2012, he scored the equaliser in a 2–1 win away to Sunderland.

Ramsey was a substitute for Arsenal's first four league games of the 2012–13 season. On 15 September, he replaced Francis Coquelin, before hitting the post in the buildup to Arsenal's fifth goal in a 6–1 win against Southampton. On 23 September, he made his first start of the season against defending champions Manchester City, impressing in the right flank role. On 3 October, Ramsey scored a chip shot with his right foot in a 3–1 win against Olympiacos in a Champions League group stage match.

On 19 December 2012, it was announced that Ramsey, along with teammates Alex Oxlade-Chamberlain, Kieran Gibbs, Jack Wilshere and Carl Jenkinson, had signed a new long-term contract with Arsenal. Due to his rise in form, he was voted man of the match in two consecutive games by the Arsenal fans on Arsenal.com against Norwich City and Everton. Ramsey was voted as Arsenal Player of the Month award by the fans. He followed this up by scoring his first league goal of the season in the 4–1 victory against Wigan Athletic, which saw the Lancashire-based club relegated from the Premier League.

==== 2013–14: Breakthrough to stardom ====
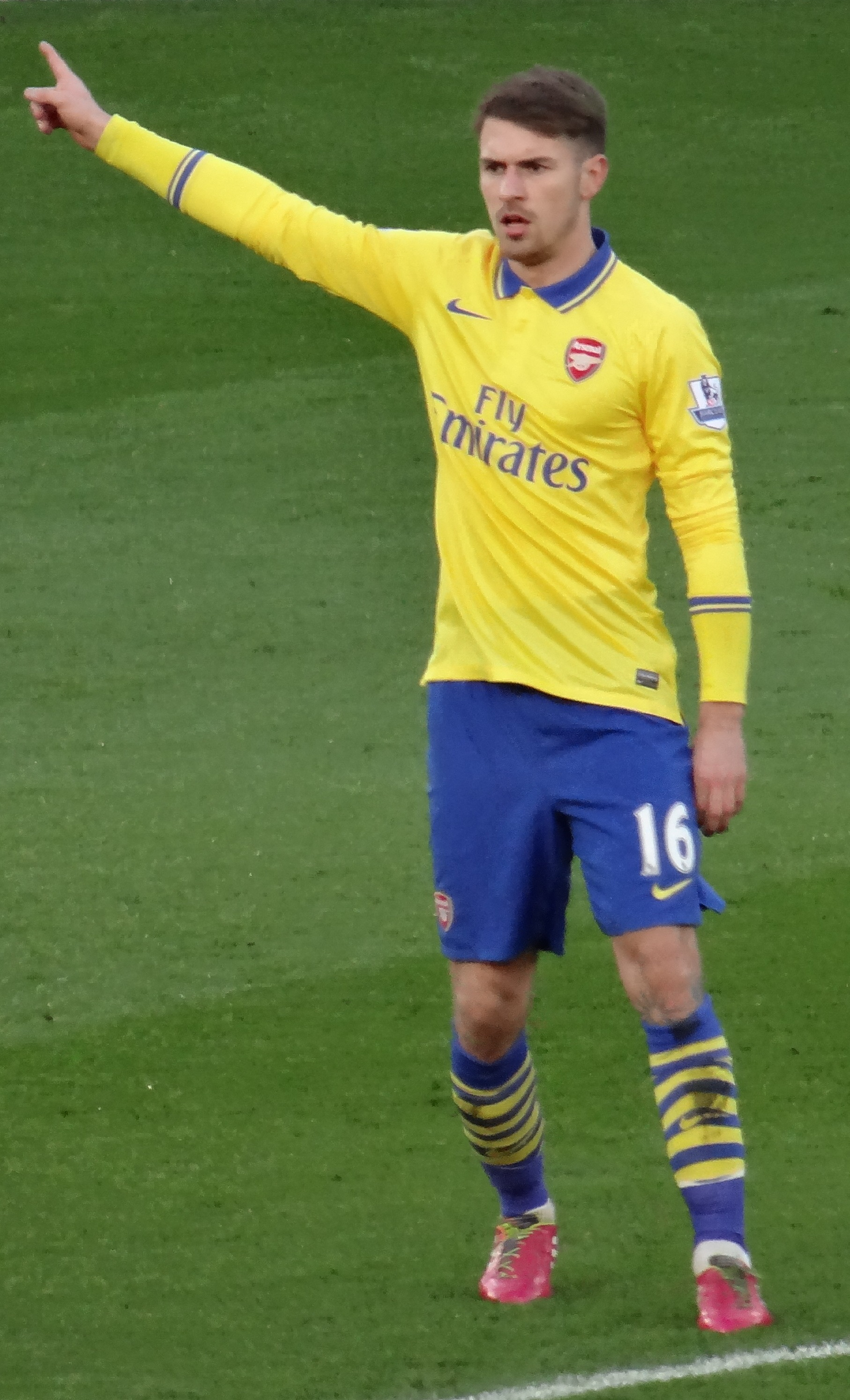
Ramsey facing former club Cardiff City in the Premier League in 2013

Ramsey started the 2013–14 season well, scoring in the first leg of the Champions League play-off against Fenerbahçe and claiming the man of the match award. In the return leg, he scored twice to end the tie 5–0 on aggregate and secure Arsenal's place in the group stage. In the Premier League, Ramsey continued his fine form in Arsenal's 3–1 win over Fulham, helping Olivier Giroud score the first goal via a deflection, and being named man of the match. The absence of Mikel Arteta from Arsenal's midfield saw Arsène Wenger field Ramsey in a deeper midfield role as opposed to 2011–12, and Ramsey thrived in the new role, with another inspired midfield performance against Tottenham Hotspur in the North London derby on 1 September, where he was involved in the build-up play to Giroud's goal. He then scored twice against Sunderland on 14 September, with his first goal being a first-touch volley, and the second involving build-up play with Giroud and new signing Mesut Özil.

Ramsey continued his excellent form by scoring in Arsenal's 2–1 win over Marseille in the Champions League at the Stade Vélodrome and scoring the opener in a 3–1 Premier League win against Stoke City four days later. On 28 September, he was again named as the man of the match as he netted another goal and claimed an assist in the away game against Swansea City, which Arsenal won 2–1. Three days later, in a game against Napoli in a Champions League fixture, he set up Özil's first goal for Arsenal. Ramsey won the Premier League Player of the Month award for September.

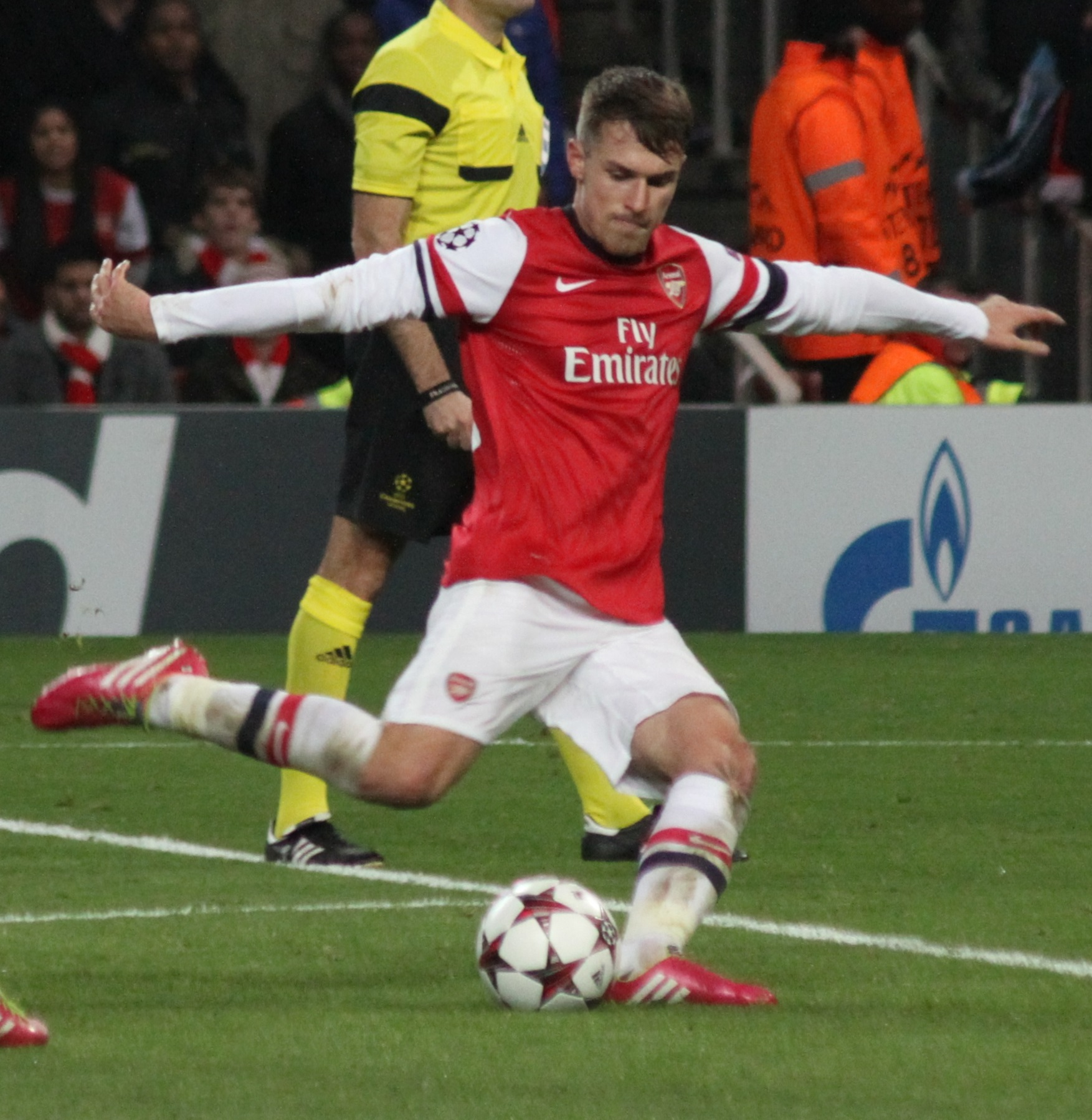
Ramsey taking a free kick in a Champions League match against Marseille in 2013

On 19 October, he scored a solo goal against Norwich City, which was his ninth goal for Arsenal in the season, before assisting the fourth Arsenal goal in a 4–1 win. His good form continued into November as he scored a spectacular long range shot from outside of the box in a 2–0 win against Liverpool on 2 November to put Arsenal five points clear at the top of the Premier League table with ten games played. He also scored a crucial second-half header four days later against Borussia Dortmund in a 1–0 away victory in the Champions League group stages, bringing his goal tally to 13 in 21 appearances for club and country. On 30 November, he scored two goals against his former club Cardiff City, and refused to celebrate out of respect. He received applause from Cardiff fans, with some even joining Arsenal fans in singing his name late on. On 26 December, he suffered a thigh strain in Arsenal's away fixture against West Ham United, eventually missing over three months of the season.

Ramsey's early season form saw him voted Arsenal's Player of the Month for four consecutive months between August and November 2013. On 18 March 2014, he signed a new contract extension with the Gunners. On 6 April, Ramsey returned from injury as a substitute in Arsenal's 3–0 loss at Everton. On 12 April, he was named in the starting line-up for the first time since Boxing Day in the FA Cup semi-final against Wigan Athletic, playing 113 minutes before being substituted for Kim Källström. On 20 April, he scored once and was credited with two assists in Arsenal's 3–0 win away to Hull City. On 18 April, Ramsey was named as one of the six players on the shortlist for the PFA Young Player of the Year award, and on 11 May he scored a volley to help his side to a 2–0 win over Norwich City on the last day of the Premier League 2013–14 season, relegating their opponents. On 17 May, Ramsey scored the winning goal in the 109th minute of the 2014 FA Cup final against Hull City, ending Arsenal's nine-year wait for a trophy.

On 4 June 2014, Ramsey was named Arsenal's Player of the Season after his performance of the 2013–14 season with 58 percent of the votes.

==== 2014–2017: FA Cup wins and individual success ====
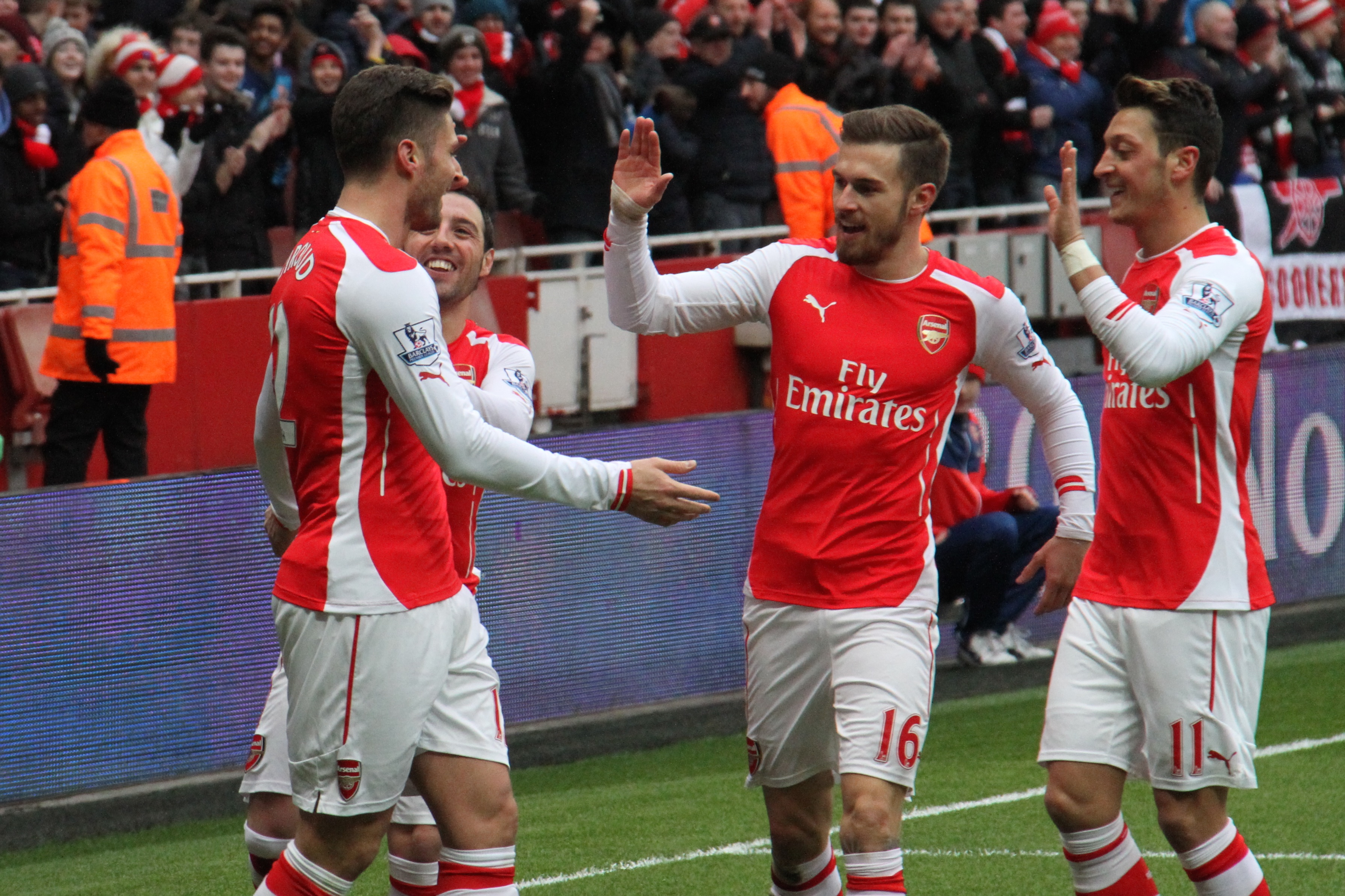
Ramsey (second from right) celebrating a goal with Olivier Giroud (left) in 2015

Ramsey started the 2014–15 season by scoring Arsenal's second goal in their 3–0 victory of Manchester City in the Community Shield on 10 August. Six days later, in the club's first league match of the season, at home against Crystal Palace, he scored the winning goal in injury-time to secure a 2–1 comeback victory. On 19 August, in the first leg of Arsenal's Champions League play-off away to Beşiktaş, he was sent off for a second booking in a goalless draw. Four days later, he scored in 2–2 draw at Goodison Park against Everton.

On 3 December, Ramsey assisted Alexis Sánchez's late winner against Southampton at home. The following league fixture saw him scoring a volley against Stoke City in a thrilling 3–2 defeat at the Britannia, ending a three-month goal drought in the process. On 9 December, he scored two goals against Galatasaray in Arsenal's last group stage match in the Champions League, helping Arsenal to a 4–1 win and second position in the group. On 4 May, Ramsey scored Arsenal's second goal in a 1–3 away league win at Hull City. On 30 May 2015, Ramsey was selected to start in the 2015 FA Cup final, playing the full 90 minutes in a 4–0 win over Aston Villa at Wembley Stadium.

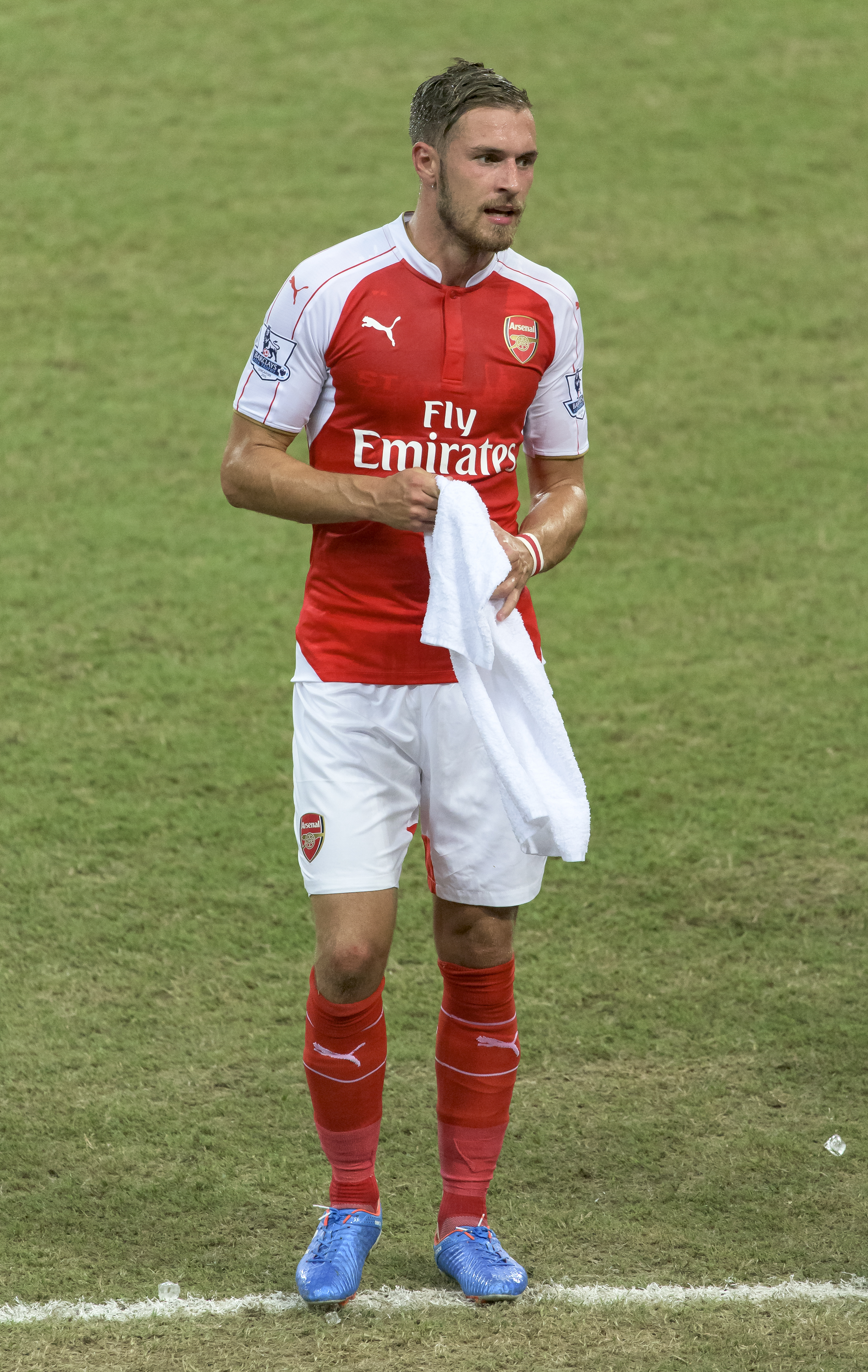
Ramsey playing for Arsenal in 2015

Ramsey scored his first goal of the 2015–16 season in a 3–0 win against Watford on 17 October at Vicarage Road. On 8 March, Ramsey suffered a thigh injury in a 4–0 away victory over Hull City in an FA Cup replay, and was ruled out for five weeks.

After Mikel Arteta's departure, Ramsey was handed the number 8 jersey. On 7 January 2017, Ramsey scored his first goal of the 2016–17 season from outside the penalty area in a 1–2 away victory over Preston North End in the third round of the FA Cup. Ramsey scored his second goal of the season against non-league outfit Lincoln City in the quarter-finals of the FA Cup, rounding Lincoln's goalkeeper before drilling it into the net for Arsenal's last goal in a 5–0 victory. On 27 May 2017, he scored the winning goal for Arsenal in the 2017 FA Cup final for a 2–1 win over Chelsea.

==== 2017–2019: Final seasons at Arsenal ====
Ramsey started in Arsenal's opening 2017–18 season Premier League fixture against Leicester City, bringing the Gunner's back to level at 3–3 in the 83rd minute in an eventual 4–3 victory. On 22 October 2017, Ramsey scored Arsenal's fourth in a 2–5 away victory against Everton at Goodison Park. A week later on 28 October 2017, Ramsey scored the winner in a 2–1 win against Swansea City, slotting into the bottom left corner from a Sead Kolašinac pass via the right foot of Swansea goalkeeper Łukasz Fabiański. The goal meant that Arsenal manager Arsène Wenger was victorious in his 800th Premier League game in charge and also was Ramsey's 50th goal for Arsenal. On 3 February 2018, Ramsey scored his first career hat-trick in a 5–1 home victory against Everton. Ramsey scored another big goal for the Gunners, netting the second goal in their 0–2 win over AC Milan at San Siro in the Europa League round of 16 first leg tie on 8 March 2018. He made a smart run on the brink of half time, receiving a pass from Mesut Özil before rounding Milan keeper Gianluigi Donnarumma and slotting it into the empty net with great composure.

After having one goal ruled out early on for offside, Ramsey scored a brace in the 4–1 quarter-final first leg victory over CSKA Moscow in the Europa League. The first a simple side-foot from a Héctor Bellerín cross, the second a brilliant instinctive volleyed flick over the goalkeeper. At the end of the season, he was voted by Arsenal fans as their player of the season, the second time he had received the honour.

On 7 October 2018, Ramsey came off the bench and scored the third goal in a 5–1 victory against Fulham in the league. His goal was later voted as Premier League Goal of the Month for October. In February 2019, it was announced that Ramsey would move to Italian club Juventus in the summer. In April, he suffered a hamstring injury, ending his season and Arsenal career.

=== Juventus ===
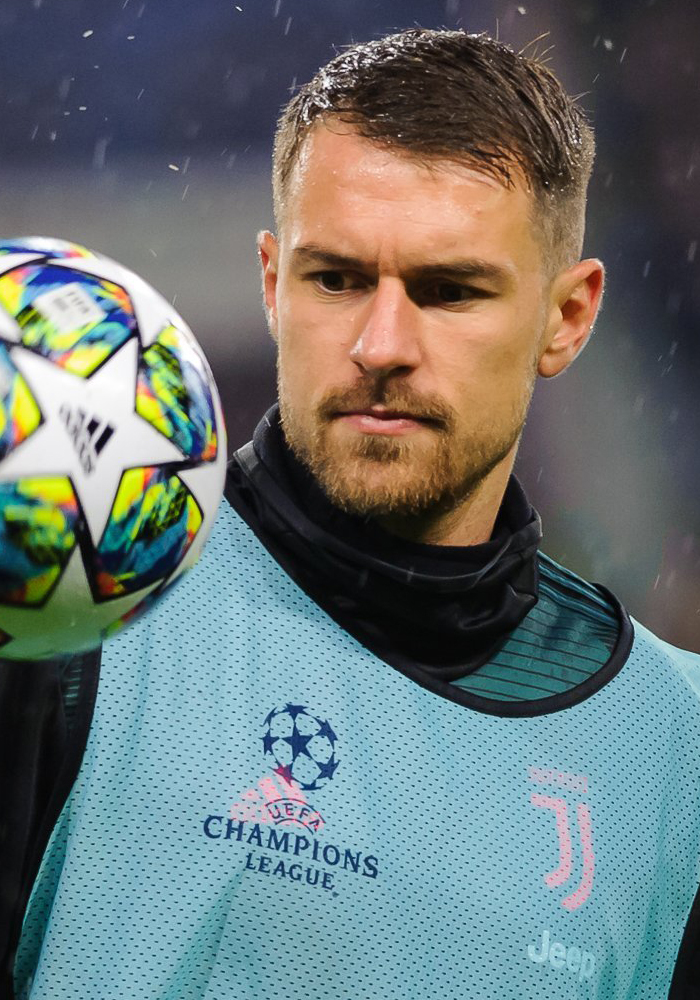
Ramsey warming up with Juventus in 2019

On 11 February 2019, Ramsey signed a four-year contract with Juventus, which officially took effect on 1 July 2019. He would receive £400,000 a week making him the highest-earning British player ever based on basic salary. He made his debut as a substitute in a pre-season friendly. His official club debut came on 18 September, when he made a second-half substitute appearance in Juventus' opening Champions League fixture of the 2019–20 season, a 2–2 away draw against Atlético Madrid. He made his Serie A debut and first start for the club on 21 September, in a 2–1 home win over Verona, during which he also scored his first goal for the club.

On 20 October 2020, Ramsey made his 50th Champions League appearance in a 2–0 away win over Dynamo Kyiv, becoming only the third Welsh male player to achieve this milestone in the competition after Ryan Giggs and Gareth Bale.

==== Loan to Rangers ====
On 31 January 2022, Ramsey signed on loan for Scottish Premiership champions Rangers, for the remainder of the 2021–22 season. While at Rangers, he scored twice in the league against Dundee and Celtic, and in the UEFA Europa League final, he came on as a late extra-time substitute, only to have his penalty saved by Eintracht Frankfurt's Kevin Trapp in the resulting shootout. Three days later, he was an unused substitute in the Scottish Cup final, as Rangers won the Scottish Cup, defeating Hearts 2–0 after extra-time. On 26 July, Juventus announced the termination of his contract.

=== Later career ===
On 1 August 2022, Ramsey signed for Nice on a free transfer. On 7 August, he scored the equaliser on his debut in a 1–1 draw against Toulouse. On 15 July 2023, Ramsey's contract with Nice was terminated by mutual consent, and he rejoined Cardiff City on a two-year deal. His son, Sonny, joined the Cardiff City academy on the same day.

On 19 April 2025, following head coach Omer Riza being relieved of his duties, Cardiff announced that Ramsey would be taking over as head coach for the club's final three games of the 2024–25 season. On 30 June 2025, he departed Cardiff City for a second time.

In July 2025, Ramsey joined Mexican club UNAM on a free transfer, following the expiry of his Cardiff City contract. He made his debut for Pumas on 24 August 2025 in a 0–0 draw against Puebla. One week later, Ramsey scored his first goal for Pumas, netting a 92nd-minute winner in a home game against Atlas. On 31 October 2025, Ramsey left UNAM after the club and the player agreed to a mutual termination of his contract. The decision followed a difficult period in which Ramsey made only six appearances, struggled with fitness issues and missed trainings amid an emotional personal crisis triggered by the disappearance of his dog, which reportedly had a significant impact on him.

On 7 April 2026, Ramsey retired from football at the age of 35.

== Managerial career ==
=== Oxford United ===
On 23 June 2026, Ramsey was appointed head coach of EFL League One club Oxford United.

== International career ==
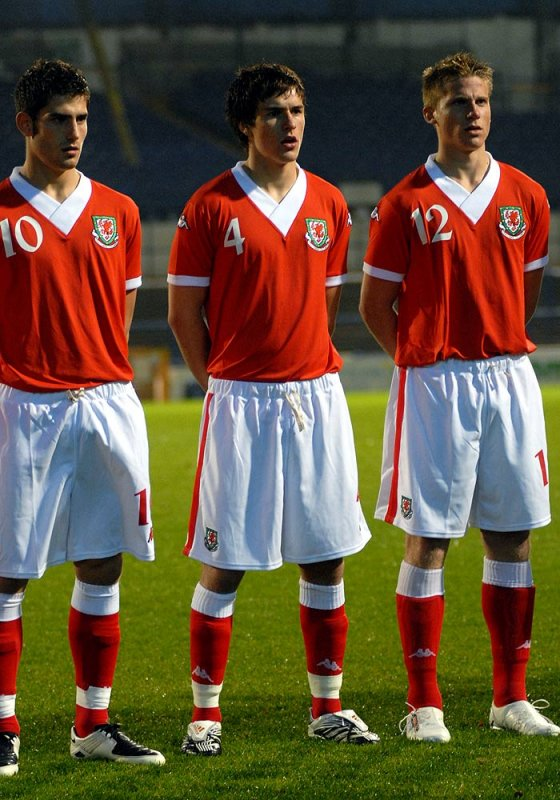
Ramsey (middle) lining up for the Wales U21 team, alongside Christian Ribeiro (right) and Ched Evans (left) in 2008

Ramsey had his first taste of international action when he was called up for the Wales U17s in 2005. A part of the new wave of young talents to emerge from the Wales youth teams, he debuted for the U21 side on 21 August 2007 in a 4–3 away win over Sweden U21s several months shy of his seventeenth birthday, breaking former club mate Chris Gunter's record. Youth coach Brian Flynn revealed that Ramsey had been purposely held back in the U21s to help qualify for the 2009 UEFA European Under-21 Championship but they lost a close contest to England U21s in the play-offs, where Ramsey himself scored a volley with his weaker foot in the second leg at Villa Park.

Ramsey made his debut for the Wales national football team on 19 November 2008, aged 17, playing 88 minutes of a 1–0 away win in Denmark. On 14 October 2009, he scored his first senior goal in the 2010 World Cup qualifier away at Liechtenstein from a free kick awarded for a trip on Gareth Bale. As the World Cup qualification campaign came to an end, he and 11 other senior internationals were recalled to Flynn's preliminary U21 squad on 30 October for a qualifier but later withdrew. On 6 November, Toshack also called him up for 14 November friendly against Scotland. Wales won 3–0 and Ramsey was involved in all of them – assisting David Edwards' opener, setting up Joe Ledley to assist the second and then scoring a solo effort. Ramsey was awarded the FAW's Young Player of the Year award that same month.

Manager Gary Speed appointed Ramsey as permanent captain of Wales, beginning with the match against England on 26 March 2011. This made him the youngest ever Wales captain at the age of 20 years 90 days, beating the record set by Mike England in 1964. He scored his first goal as captain in Wales' final Nations Cup match against Northern Ireland on 27 May 2011.

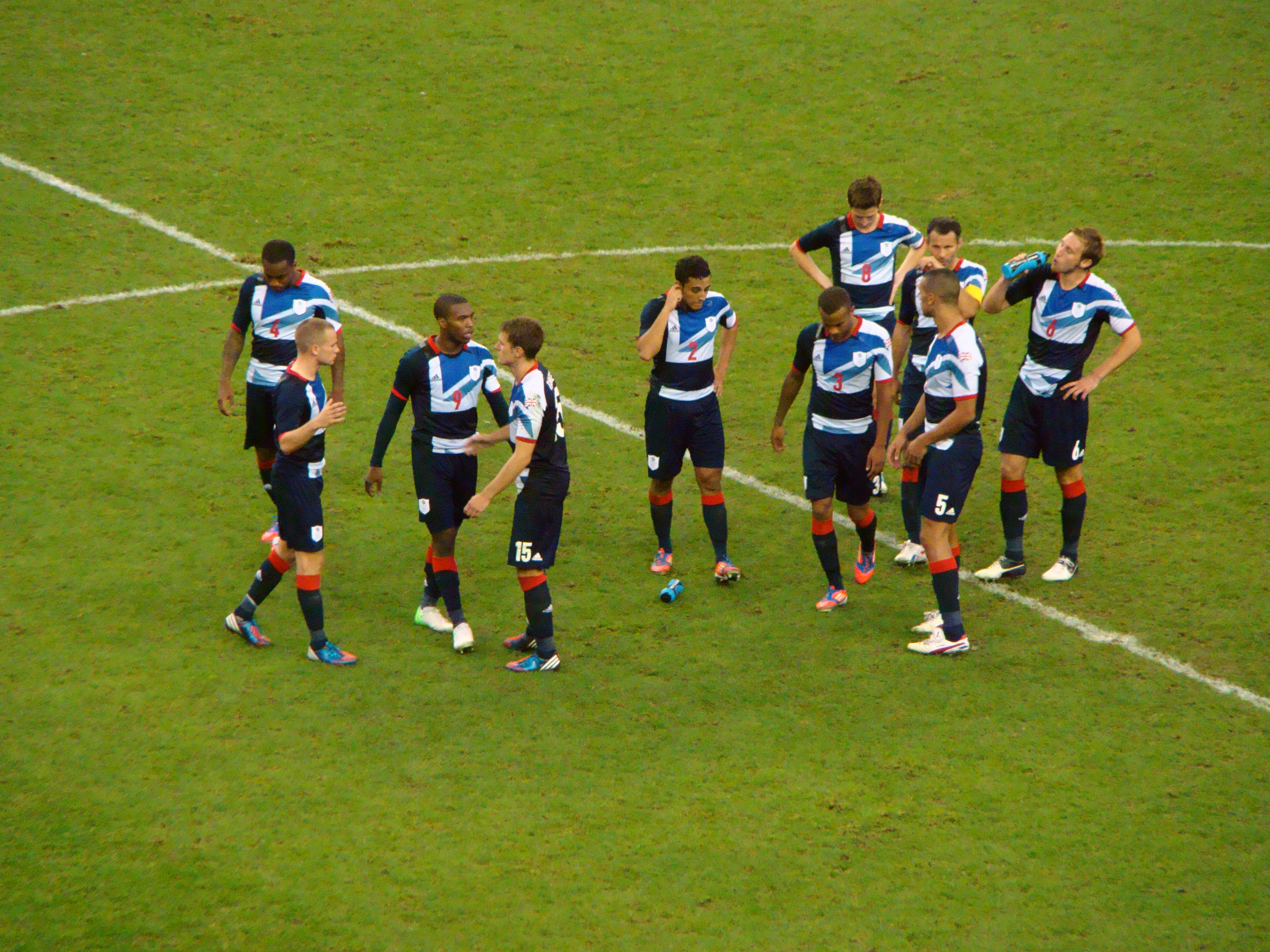
Ramsey (fourth from left) with Great Britain at the 2012 Olympics

Ramsey was one of five Welshmen selected to compete at the 2012 Olympic Football Tournament for Great Britain. He featured in all three group games, the latter two as a starter. In the quarter-finals against South Korea on 4 August at Cardiff's Millennium Stadium, he equalised with a penalty kick and the match finished 1–1; he scored again in the penalty shootout which his team lost.

In October 2012, Ashley Williams was appointed captain of Wales by Chris Coleman, replacing Ramsey after a run of defeats, but the manager said Ramsey would most likely be captain of Wales again in his career. On 22 March 2013, Ramsey scored an equalising 73rd-minute penalty in a 2–1 victory over fellow British rivals Scotland in a 2014 FIFA World Cup qualification fixture. However, he received a red card for a foul on James McArthur during added time.

On 31 May 2016, Ramsey was named in the 23-man Wales squad for Euro 2016. On 11 June, in Wales' opening match of the tournament, he set-up Hal Robson-Kanu's match-winning goal in a 2–1 win over Slovakia; this was Wales' first win in a major international football tournament in 58 years. On 20 June, in his team's final group match, he scored the opening goal of a 3–0 win over Russia, which saw Wales top their group; he also set-up the final goal of the match, which was scored by Gareth Bale. In the round of 16 match against Northern Ireland on 25 June, Ramsey once again contributed to a Welsh victory in the 75th minute of play; he played a pass to Bale, who then delivered a cross into the penalty area; defender Gareth McAuley deflected the ball into his own net, and Wales won the match 1–0. Ramsey was booked in injury-time for kicking the ball away after conceding a foul. In the quarter-final against Belgium on 1 July, Ramsey set up two goals in a 3–1 win which ultimately saw his nation advance to the semi-finals; however, he was booked for the second time in the tournament during the match, which ruled him out of the semi-final. Wales were eliminated from the tournament in the following match by eventual champions Portugal on 6 July. Ramsey finished the tournament as the joint-highest assist provider, with four assists, alongside Eden Hazard, and was named to the team of the tournament for his performances.

Ramsey missed the first three matches in Wales' qualification group for the 2018 FIFA World Cup, but played the full 90 minutes for the other seven. He scored the opening goal in a 1–1 draw with Serbia and the second goal in a 2–0 win over Moldova, and assisted Tom Lawrence's goal against Georgia. Ultimately, Wales missed out on qualifying for the World Cup, as they lost to the Republic of Ireland in the final group match, with the Irish finishing above them in second place. When the two countries met again in the UEFA Nations League, Wales won the match 4–1, with Ramsey scoring the third goal. He missed much of the qualification group matches for UEFA Euro 2020 through injury, but he came off the bench to play thirty minutes against Azerbaijan and in the final group match, he scored a brace against Hungary to secure qualification. The following year, further injuries prevented him from making more than one appearance for Wales, and in 2021, he played in two friendlies, before being named in the 26-man Wales squad for Euro 2020, which was delayed due to the COVID-19 pandemic. He scored the opening goal in Wales's second group match on 16 June, a 2–0 win over Turkey; he helped his country qualify for the round of 16, in which they were beaten 4–0 by Denmark. Ramsey missed the September matches of Wales' qualification group for the 2022 FIFA World Cup, and returned the next month, where he scored against the Czech Republic. He then went on to provide the assist for Kieffer Moore in a 1–0 win over Estonia, and scored another brace against Belarus. Wales finished second in their group behind Belgium, qualifying for the play-off semi-final. Ramsey played in the semi-finals and the final, overcoming Austria and Ukraine, respectively, thus cementing their place in history as the first Welsh squad to qualify for a World Cup in 64 years. In November 2022, he was named in the 26-man Wales squad for the 2022 FIFA World Cup. Ramsey played in all three group matches, but Wales finished bottom of their group.

On 14 March 2023, Wales announced that Ramsey had been named captain again following the retirement of Gareth Bale. On 11 September, he scored his 100th career goal when he scored from the penalty spot in Wales' 2–0 win over Latvia.

Having not played for Wales since their 2-1 victory over Montengro on 9 September 2024, he announced his retirement from football on 7 April 2026.

== Style of play ==
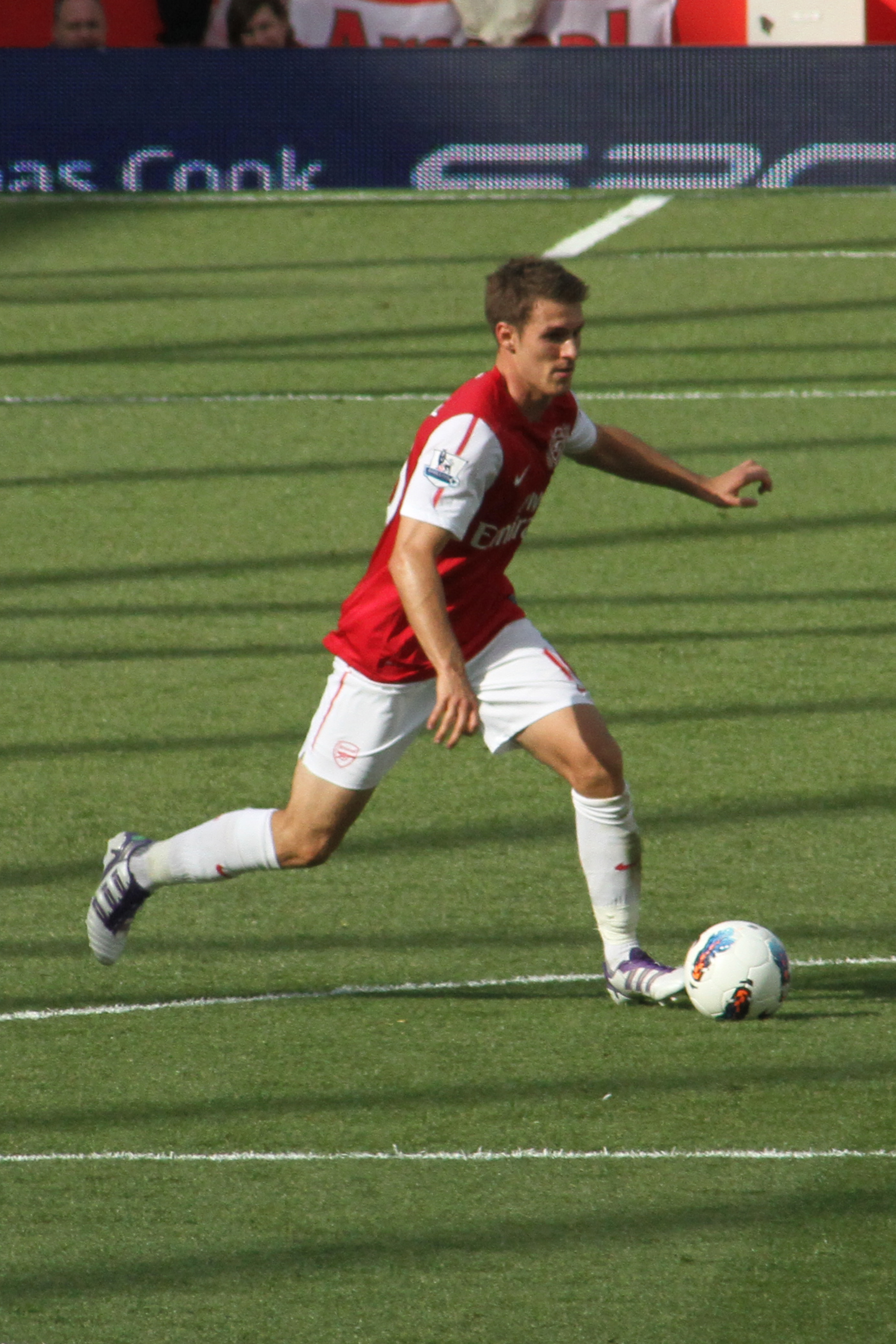
Ramsey on the ball for Arsenal against Swansea in a Premier League match in 2011

Ramsey blends superior technique with a powerful running style, and is predominantly known for his offensive movement off the ball and his attacking capabilities as a midfielder, in particular his ability to make late runs into the penalty area, and score goals. In addition to his technical skills and offensive prowess, Ramsey has also been praised in the media for his energy, tenacity, and work-rate across the pitch. He is also a precise passer, and possesses good vision, which enables him to link-up with other players and create chances for teammates after winning back possession, in addition to scoring goals himself. Although his favoured role is in the centre of the pitch, as either a central or attacking midfielder, he is also capable of playing out wide, as a winger on either flank; he also been deployed in a deeper midfield position, or even in a box-to-box role on occasion. During his time at Juventus, he was deployed in a new position on occasion under manager Maurizio Sarri, and was fielded as an offensive-minded central midfielder, known as the mezzala role in Italian football jargon. Despite his ability, however, he has often struggled with injuries throughout his career.

During the 2013–14 Premier League season, Ramsey developed into one of Arsenal's most influential players. Then-Arsenal manager Arsène Wenger has described Ramsey as a "complete midfielder", and stated: "I was a midfielder, and I would have loved to have had what he has. He can defend, he can attack, he can score goals. What more do you want?" Ramsey was rewarded for his outstanding form during the 2013–14 season by being named Arsenal's Player of the Season. Long known for his technical ability, during the 2013–14 Premier League season, Ramsey also developed into a strong runner with the ball. Wenger observed, "[Ramsey] is now brushing opponents off and running away from them with ease." Former Arsenal midfielder Ray Parlour said that Ramsey could "become as influential as Steven Gerrard".

In November 2013, Ramsey was ranked alongside Manchester City's Yaya Touré as the best central midfielder in the 2013–14 Premier League season. On 24 December 2013, Ramsey and Touré were reported to be the only two players in the Premier League to have completed more than 1,000 passes. Despite missing over three months of the 2013–14 Premier League, Ramsey was the Arsenal player who won the most tackles throughout the season. He was also the team's second-top scorer for the season (16 goals), and provided the second-highest number of assists for the season (8).

In December 2015, former Liverpool captain Gerrard hailed Ramsey as "the best attacking midfielder in the Premier League".

== Personal life ==
Ramsey married Colleen Rowlands at Caldicot Castle in Monmouthshire, Wales on 8 June 2014. They have three children.

Ramsey is a supporter of the World Wildlife Fund and has spoken of his "passion" for animals and their conservation. In January 2014 Ramsey signed a modelling contract with Elite Model Management London. Ramsey has been sponsored by Adidas.

== Career statistics ==
=== Club ===
Appearances and goals by club, season and competition
Club	Season	League			National cup (Note: Includes FA Cup, Coppa Italia, Scottish Cup)		League cup (Note: Includes Football League/EFL Cup)		Continental		Other		Total	
Club	Season	Division	Apps	Goals	Apps	Goals	Apps	Goals	Apps	Goals	Apps	Goals	Apps	Goals
Cardiff City	2006–07	Championship	1	0	0	0	0	0	—		—		1	0
Cardiff City	2007–08	Championship	15	1	5	1	1	0	—		—		21	2
Cardiff City	Total		16	1	5	1	1	0	—		—		22	2
Arsenal	2008–09	Premier League	9	0	4	0	3	0	6 (Note: Appearances in UEFA Champions League)	1	—		22	1
Arsenal	2009–10	Premier League	18	3	2	1	3	0	6	0	—		29	4
Arsenal	2010–11	Premier League	7	1	1	0	0	0	0	0	—		8	1
Arsenal	2011–12	Premier League	34	2	3	0	0	0	7	1	—		44	3
Arsenal	2012–13	Premier League	36	1	3	0	1	0	7	1	—		47	2
Arsenal	2013–14	Premier League	23	10	2	1	1	0	8	5	—		34	16
Arsenal	2014–15	Premier League	29	6	4	0	0	0	7	3	1 (Note: Appearance in FA Community Shield)	1	41	10
Arsenal	2015–16	Premier League	31	5	2	1	1	0	5	0	1	0	40	6
Arsenal	2016–17	Premier League	23	1	4	3	1	0	4	0	—		32	4
Arsenal	2017–18	Premier League	24	7	0	0	2	0	6 (Note: Appearances in UEFA Europa League)	4	0	0	32	11
Arsenal	2018–19	Premier League	28	4	2	0	3	0	7	2	—		40	6
Arsenal	Total		262	40	27	6	15	0	63	17	2	1	369	64
Nottingham Forest (loan)	2010–11	Championship	5	0	—		—		—		—		5	0
Cardiff City (loan)	2010–11	Championship	6	1	—		—		—		—		6	1
Juventus	2019–20	Serie A	24	3	4	0	—		6	1	1 (Note: Appearance in Supercoppa Italiana)	0	35	4
Juventus	2020–21	Serie A	22	2	1	0	—		7	0	0	0	30	2
Juventus	2021–22	Serie A	3	0	0	0	—		2	0	0	0	5	0
Juventus	Total		49	5	5	0	—		15	1	1	0	70	6
Rangers (loan)	2021–22	Scottish Premiership	7	2	3	0	—		3	0	—		13	2
Nice	2022–23	Ligue 1	27	1	0	0	—		7 (Note: Appearances in UEFA Europa Conference League)	0	—		34	1
Cardiff City	2023–24	Championship	13	3	0	0	0	0	—		—		13	3
Cardiff City	2024–25	Championship	8	0	2	0	0	0	—		—		10	0
Cardiff City	Total		21	3	2	0	0	0	—		—		23	3
UNAM	2025–26	Liga MX	6	1	—		—		—		—		6	1
Career total			399	54	42	7	16	0	88	18	3	1	548	80

=== International ===
Appearances and goals by national team and year
National team	Year	Apps	Goals
Wales	2008	1	0
Wales	2009	10	2
Wales	2010	0	0
Wales	2011	9	3
Wales	2012	5	0
Wales	2013	5	3
Wales	2014	2	0
Wales	2015	6	2
Wales	2016	7	1
Wales	2017	7	2
Wales	2018	6	1
Wales	2019	2	2
Wales	2020	1	0
Wales	2021	10	4
Wales	2022	7	0
Wales	2023	6	1
Wales	2024	2	0
Total		86	21

Scores and results list Wales' goal tally first, score column indicates score after each Ramsey goal.

List of international goals scored by Aaron Ramsey for Wales
No.	Date	Venue	Opponent	Score	Result	Competition
1	14 October 2009	Rheinpark Stadion, Vaduz, Liechtenstein	Liechtenstein	2–0	2–0	2010 FIFA World Cup qualification
2	14 November 2009	Cardiff City Stadium, Cardiff, Wales	Scotland	3–0	3–0	Friendly
3	27 May 2011	Aviva Stadium, Dublin, Ireland	Northern Ireland	1–0	2–0	2011 Nations Cup
4	2 September 2011	Cardiff City Stadium, Cardiff, Wales	Montenegro	2–0	2–1	UEFA Euro 2012 qualifying
5	7 October 2011	Liberty Stadium, Swansea, Wales	Switzerland	1–0	2–0	UEFA Euro 2012 qualifying
6	22 March 2013	Hampden Park, Glasgow, Scotland	Scotland	1–1	2–1	2014 FIFA World Cup qualification
7	6 September 2013	Philip II Arena, Skopje, Macedonia	Macedonia	1–1	1–2	2014 FIFA World Cup qualification
8	15 October 2013	King Baudouin Stadium, Brussels, Belgium	Belgium	1–1	1–1	2014 FIFA World Cup qualification
9	28 March 2015	Sammy Ofer Stadium, Haifa, Israel	Israel	1–0	3–0	UEFA Euro 2016 qualifying
10	13 October 2015	Cardiff City Stadium, Cardiff, Wales	Andorra	1–0	2–0	UEFA Euro 2016 qualifying
11	20 June 2016	Stadium Municipal, Toulouse, France	Russia	1–0	3–0	UEFA Euro 2016
12	11 June 2017	Red Star Stadium, Belgrade, Serbia	Serbia	1–0	1–1	2018 FIFA World Cup qualification
13	5 September 2017	Zimbru Stadium, Chișinău, Moldova	Moldova	2–0	2–0	2018 FIFA World Cup qualification
14	6 September 2018	Cardiff City Stadium, Cardiff, Wales	Republic of Ireland	3–0	4–1	2018–19 UEFA Nations League B
15	19 November 2019	Cardiff City Stadium, Cardiff, Wales	Hungary	1–0	2–0	UEFA Euro 2020 qualifying
16	19 November 2019	Cardiff City Stadium, Cardiff, Wales	Hungary	2–0	2–0	UEFA Euro 2020 qualifying
17	16 June 2021	Olympic Stadium, Baku, Azerbaijan	Turkey	1–0	2–0	UEFA Euro 2020
18	8 October 2021	Sinobo Stadium, Prague, Czech Republic	Czech Republic	1–0	2–2	2022 FIFA World Cup qualification
19	13 November 2021	Cardiff City Stadium, Cardiff, Wales	Belarus	1–0	5–1	2022 FIFA World Cup qualification
20	13 November 2021	Cardiff City Stadium, Cardiff, Wales	Belarus	3–0	5–1	2022 FIFA World Cup qualification
21	11 September 2023	Skonto Stadium, Riga, Latvia	Latvia	1–0	2–0	UEFA Euro 2024 qualifying

== Managerial statistics ==
As of matches played 21 November 2026

Team	From	To	Record					Ref
Team	From	To	G	W	D	L	Win %	Ref
Cardiff City (caretaker)	19 April 2025	30 June 2025	3	0	2	1	0.00	
Oxford United	23 June 2026	present	18	9	6	3	50.00	
Total			21	9	8	4	42.86	

== Honours ==
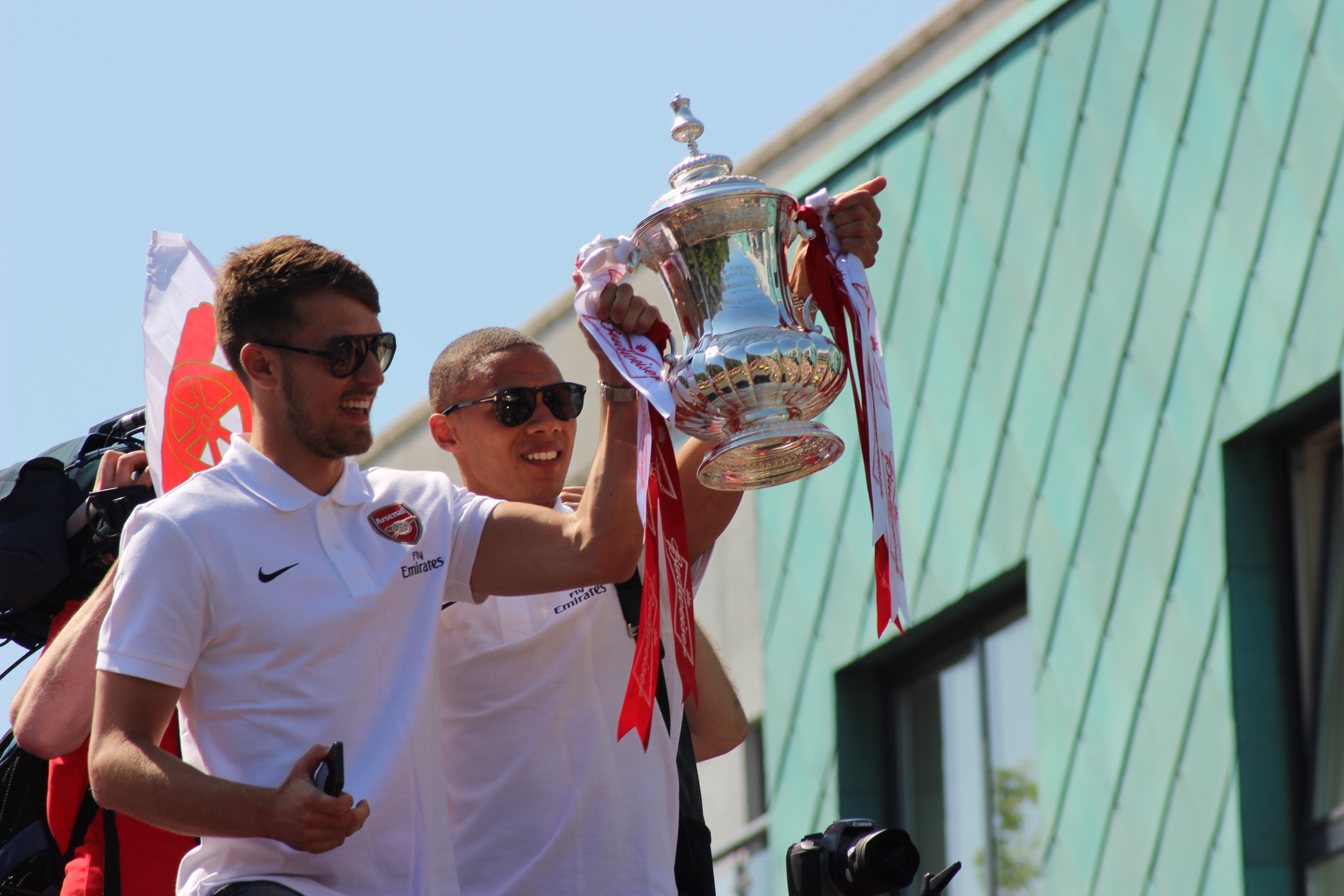
Ramsey with the FA Cup trophy in 2014

Cardiff City

- FA Cup runner-up: 2007–08

Arsenal

- FA Cup: 2013–14, 2014–15, 2016–17
- FA Community Shield: 2014, 2015
- EFL Cup runner-up: 2017–18
- UEFA Europa League runner-up: 2018–19

Juventus

- Serie A: 2019–20
- Coppa Italia: 2020–21; runner-up: 2019–20
- Supercoppa Italiana: 2020

Rangers

- Scottish Cup: 2021–22
- UEFA Europa League runner-up: 2021–22

Individual

- Welsh Young Player of the Year: 2009, 2010
- Premier League Player of the Month: September 2013
- Arsenal Player of the Season: 2013–14, 2017–18
- London Player of the Year: 2014
- UEFA European Championship Team of the Tournament: 2016
- UEFA European Championship top assist provider: 2016
- Premier League Goal of the Month: October 2018
