= 2014 FA Community Shield =

- The match programme cover
Arsenal	Manchester City
3	0
- Date: 10 August 2014
- Venue: Wembley Stadium, London
- Man of the Match: Olivier Giroud (Arsenal)
- Referee: Michael Oliver (Northumberland)
- Attendance: 71,523
- Weather: Partly cloudy 20 °C (68 °F)

The 2014 FA Community Shield (also known as The FA Community Shield supported by McDonald's for sponsorship reasons) was the 92nd FA Community Shield, an annual English football match played between the winners of the previous season's Premier League and FA Cup. The game was played between Arsenal, who beat Hull City in the final of the 2013–14 FA Cup, and Manchester City, champions of the 2013–14 Premier League.

Manchester United were the holders, having won the 2013 edition, but did not qualify for this match, as they finished seventh in the Premier League and were knocked out of the FA Cup in the third round.

This was Arsenal's 20th Community Shield appearance and Manchester City's 10th. The only time the two teams previously met in the Shield was in 1934, when Arsenal won 4–0. The 2014 staging of the event was the first to use vanishing spray, following its success at the 2014 FIFA World Cup. In the lead up to the match Manchester City manager Manuel Pellegrini defended his club's transfer recruitment, after it was questioned by the Arsenal manager Arsène Wenger.

Alexis Sánchez was one of three players who made their competitive debuts for Arsenal in the match; for Manchester City, goalkeeper Willy Caballero was selected ahead of Joe Hart. Arsenal began the game more strongly and took the lead when Santi Cazorla scored in the 22nd minute. Their lead was extended two minutes before half time, as Aaron Ramsey finished off a counter-attacking move. Arsenal scored their third of the match soon after the hour mark; Olivier Giroud's shot from outside the penalty box dipped over Caballero and into his goal.

Watched by a crowd of 71,523 at Wembley Stadium in London, Arsenal won the match 3–0. It was the biggest win at the Community Shield in 16 years, when they defeated United, City's cross-city rivals. Wenger was pleased with his team's performance and felt the win would provide a confidence boost for the coming season. Pellegrini's reaction was indifferent; he believed the absence of several first team players was linked to their poor show.

== Background ==
Founded in 1908 as a successor to the Sheriff of London Charity Shield, the FA Community Shield began as a contest between the respective champions of the Football League and Southern League, although in 1913 it was played between an Amateurs XI and a Professionals XI. In 1921, it was played by the league champions of the top division and FA Cup winners for the first time. (Note: The Premier League replaced the Football League First Division at the top of the English football pyramid after its inception in 1992.) As part of a sponsorship deal between The Football Association and American restaurant chain McDonald's, the match was officially referred to as "The FA Community Shield supported by McDonald's".

Manchester City qualified for the 2014 FA Community Shield as winners of the 2013–14 Premier League. The club saw off competition from Liverpool and won their second league title in three years with victory against West Ham United on the last day. The other Community Shield place went to Arsenal, who defeated Hull City in extra time to win the final of the 2013–14 FA Cup. It ended a run of nine years without a trophy for the club.

Manchester City made their 10th Community Shield appearance; prior to this, they won four (1937, 1968, 1972, 2012) and lost five – one of which against Arsenal in 1934. By contrast, Arsenal made their 20th Community Shield appearance, a record bettered only by Manchester United (29) and Liverpool (21). Arsenal had won 12 times, 11 of which were won outright, most recently in 2004.

The match was televised live in the United Kingdom on BT Sport; the network obtained rights to the Community Shield in July 2013 as part of a four-year deal with the BBC to air live FA Cup football.

== Build-up ==
Arsenal manager Arsène Wenger used his press conference before the match to look ahead to the new season. He wanted his team to build on their FA Cup success and said that the Community Shield "...will be the best way to prepare for the start of the League season next week." Wenger was surprised his opponents Manchester City had taken midfielder Frank Lampard from their own franchise club New York City FC on loan; he questioned whether this was a way to bypass UEFA's Financial Fair Play rules. Of Bacary Sagna's move from Arsenal to Manchester City in the summer, Wenger told reporters: "I made him a proposal to stay for three years, but he chose them. Had he chosen a long time ago? Maybe – it looks to me like he agreed it a long time before." Wenger also revealed Arsenal had received offers for defender Thomas Vermaelen; on the day of the Community Shield match the player transferred to Barcelona.

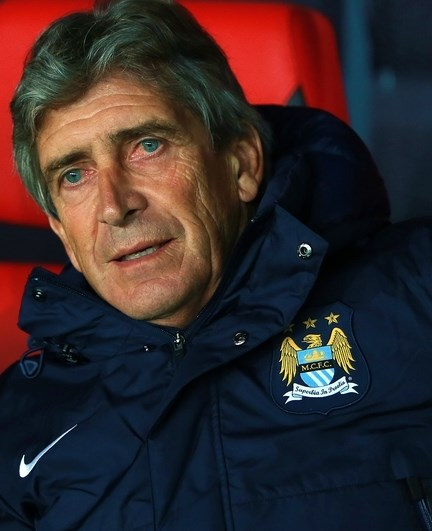
Manuel Pellegrini said that Manchester City would use the Community Shield as a way to start the season well.

Manuel Pellegrini, the manager of Manchester City, said before the game that winning the Shield "would be the ideal start to the campaign." He was conscious of his team's poor start to the previous season and wanted them to do better, particularly away from home. Pellegrini did not see the game against Arsenal as a "friendly", and expected his opponents to provide a good test for Manchester City in the Shield match and thereafter in the league season. He was satisfied overall with the club's transfer activity during the summer, in particular praising goalkeeper Willy Caballero. When asked about Wenger's comments about Manchester City, he retorted: "As a manager we have enough problems with our own teams to be talking about other teams." Pellegrini expressed his belief that Lampard's transfer was not done by underhand tactics – "we didn’t spend any money in bringing him from New York City to Manchester City," and added the player was not offered a contract to remain at Chelsea.

Aaron Ramsey, who scored Arsenal's winning goal in the FA Cup final, was adamant their recent success would make his teammates determined to win more. He aimed for victory in the Community Shield, as it would provide a platform for what he described as "a tough opening couple of games in the Premier League." Samir Nasri, who left Arsenal to join Manchester City in 2011, in the lead-up to the match described the abuse he received from Arsenal supporters since his transfer as "stupid." He went on to explain: "They see it as treason or that I betrayed them but it’s not like that. I just look what’s best for me ... For the fans the only reason [to leave] has to be for the money. But it isn’t just for the money."

Both clubs received an allocation of approximately 26,000 tickets. Manchester City fans were housed in the east end of Wembley, while Arsenal fans occupied the west. Ticket prices stayed the same for the third consecutive year and were advertised at a cost of between £20 and £45; the tickets went on general sale for Manchester City fans on 22 July 2014. Arsenal chief executive Ivan Gazidis was upset by the low allocation: "We have expressed our disappointment to the FA regarding the ticket allocation for both the FA Cup final and FA Community Shield."

Michael Oliver was selected as the referee for the Shield match; it marked the fifth time he refereed at Wembley Stadium. The game was the first in English football to use vanishing spray, designed to help referees mark free-kick positions. This came after the spray's success at the 2014 FIFA World Cup. English rock band Embrace provided pre-match entertainment and Britain's Got Talent finalist Lucy Kay sung the national anthem before the match commenced.

== Match ==
=== Team selection ===
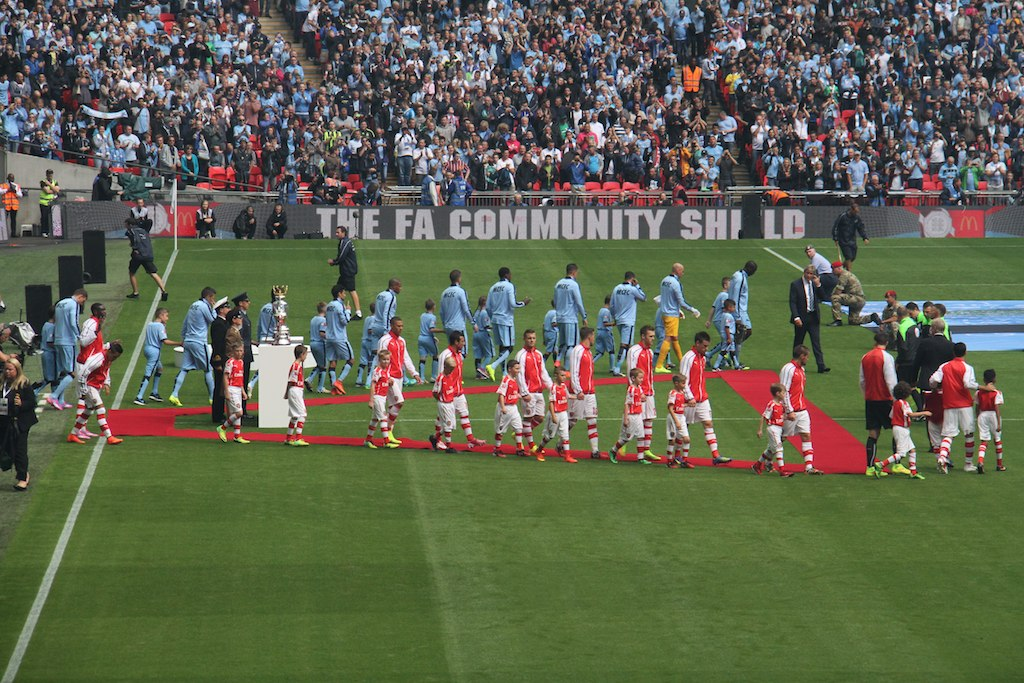
The two teams led out by their managers

Manchester City were predicted to line up in a 4–2–3–1 formation, with Nasri and James Milner as wide men. Due to a specified pre-season programme, Pellegrini had agreed to excuse several players from the match, namely Martín Demichelis, Vincent Kompany, Pablo Zabaleta, Bacary Sagna, Fernandinho, Frank Lampard and Sergio Agüero. Striker Álvaro Negredo was also unavailable for selection because of an injury. Arsenal were expected to line up similarly to Manchester City, with Ramsey as a holding midfielder, and Tomáš Rosický in an advanced role behind Olivier Giroud. Goalkeeper David Ospina was ruled out of the game with a thigh injury; German internationals Per Mertesacker, Mesut Özil and Lukas Podolski did not feature as they were given extended time off following their national side's success at the World Cup.

When the teamsheets were released, Wenger's selection showed Rosický and Giroud would start the match as substitutes and competitive debuts were given to Mathieu Debuchy, Calum Chambers and Alexis Sánchez. Arsenal employed a 4–1–4–1 formation to start the game, with a defensive midfielder (Mikel Arteta) sitting between a flat back four and a four-man midfield; Yaya Sanogo led the Arsenal attack as a lone centre-forward.

Manchester City organised themselves slightly differently, with two defensive midfielders and an attacking midfielder – Stevan Jovetić – playing behind the main striker, Edin Džeko. Caballero and Fernando made their debuts for the club, while Bruno Zuculini was named on the bench. The team lined up in a 4–2–3–1 formation. There were no English players in the Manchester City starting XI.

=== Summary ===
==== First half ====
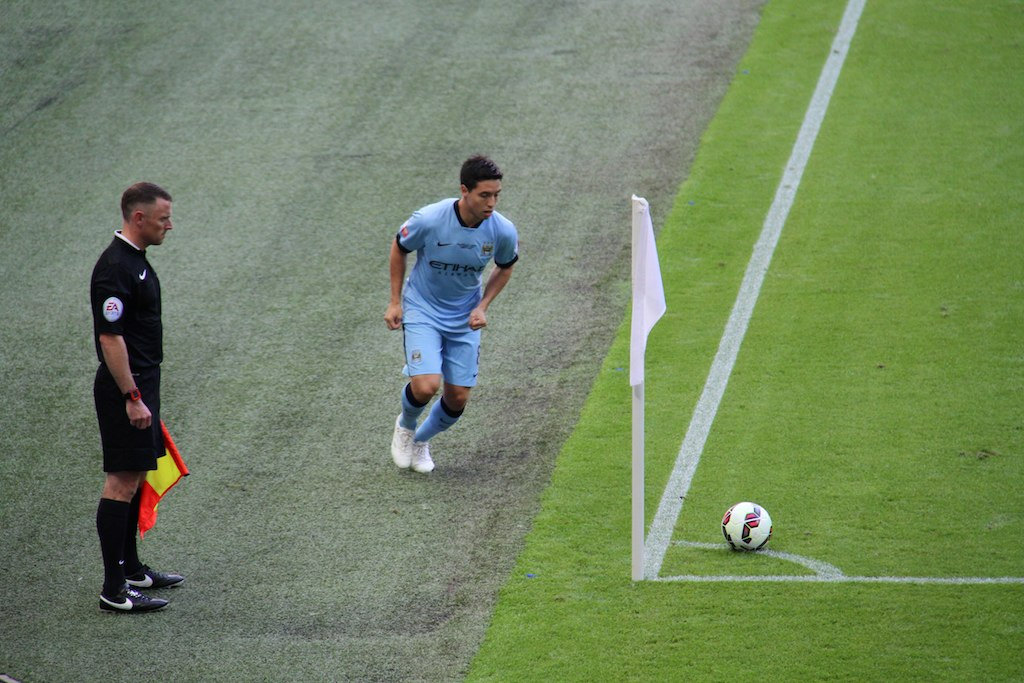
Samir Nasri taking a corner in the first half

Manchester City got the match underway and won the first corner kick of the match in the fifth minute. In the eighth minute, Debuchy crossed the ball from the right, but Sanogo's attempt to head the ball was impeded by Clichy. An Arsenal corner minutes after resulted in Manchester City reacting with a counter-attack; the ball eventually reached an unmarked Nasri in the penalty area, but the midfielder's shot on goal was blocked by Debuchy's arm. Manchester City appealed for a penalty kick, which was not given by referee Oliver. Arsenal continued to build pressure in Manchester City's half and scored the opening goal. Sanogo kept possession of the ball and passed to Wilshere, who was tackled. The ball then fell to Santi Cazorla, who created space for himself and shot into the bottom right hand corner of Caballero's goal. A corner taken by Nasri in the 22nd minute was greeted by jeers from the Arsenal supporters, as was his every touch of the ball. Near the half-hour mark Arsenal countered through Sánchez, but his pass to Ramsey was quickly intercepted. From a corner, Sanogo directed his header straight at Caballero. As the game went on Manchester City began to gather momentum, with Aleksandar Kolarov finding success from attacking Arsenal's right. Despite improved play, Manchester City were losing 0–2 after 42 minutes when Sanogo began the move by keeping possession and finding Ramsey with a pass. The midfielder took one touch to side-step Matija Nastasić and another to put the ball into the net. Arsenal came close to scoring a third goal just before half-time when Sanogo and Sánchez exchanged passes near the Manchester City area, but Caballero came out of his penalty box to break up the move.

==== Second half ====
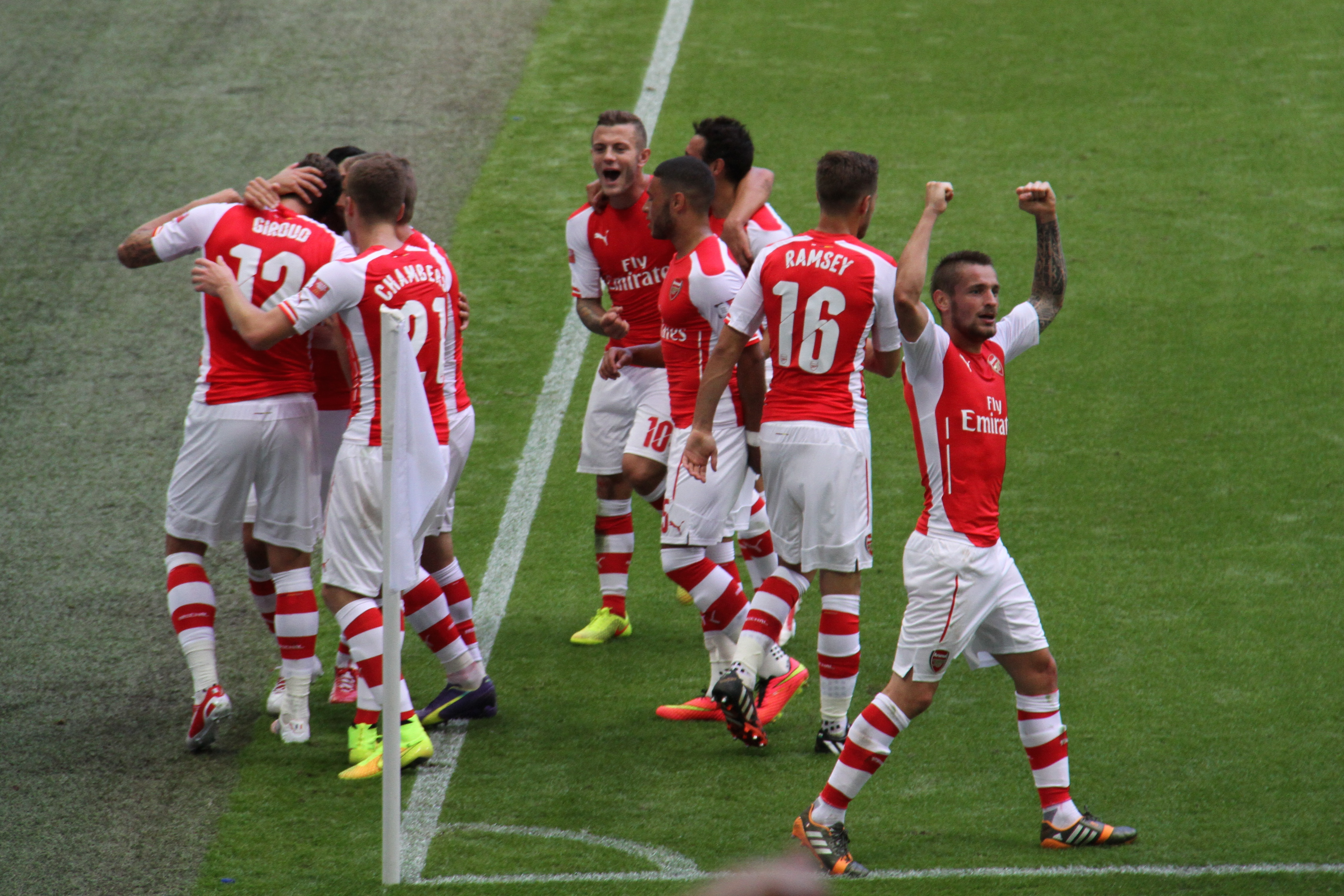
The Arsenal players celebrating Olivier Giroud's goal.

Arsenal made a triple substitution before the second half commenced – Laurent Koscielny, Sánchez and Sanogo came off for Nacho Monreal, Alex Oxlade-Chamberlain and Olivier Giroud. Manchester City meanwhile replaced Nasri with David Silva. In contrast to the first 45 minutes, Manchester City started well; three minutes after the start of the half, Kolarov collected the ball from Silva and charged forward, but his cross on the left flank was cleared by Monreal. In the 50th minute, Fernando was shown the game's first and only yellow card for fouling Wilshere. Manchester City continued to fashion opportunities: Navas beat his opponent Kieran Gibbs on the right and crossed the ball in the Arsenal area. Jovetić's header was kept out by Wojciech Szczęsny and on the rebound he struck the ball over the goal. Szczęsny denied Jovetić again in the 56th minute, diving to his right to clear. Manchester City made two changes on the hour, bringing on Milner and Bruno Zuculini for Džeko and Yaya Touré. A shot by Giroud from 25 yards (23 m) dipped over Caballero and landed in the net to make it 3–0 to Arsenal. Manchester City responded with some opportunities to score – Jovetić's attempt at an overhead kick went over the bar in the 65th minute, and minutes later Szczęsny saved from Zuculini in a collision which required treatment for both players. Both teams made more substitutions in the final third of the game – for Arsenal Mathieu Flamini, Rosický and debutant Joel Campbell replaced Wilshere, Cazorla and Ramsey respectively, while Manchester City brought on Micah Richards and Scott Sinclair in place of Kolarov and Navas. Near the end, Szczęsny came out of his penalty box and cleared the ball with his head, but inadvertently collided with Sinclair.

=== Details ===
10 August 2014
15:00 BST

Arsenal	3–0	Manchester City
Cazorla 21'; Ramsey 42'; Giroud 60'	Report

Wembley Stadium, London
Attendance: 71,523
Referee: Michael Oliver (Northumberland)

Arsenal	Manchester City

GK	1	(Poland) Wojciech Szczęsny
RB	2	(France) Mathieu Debuchy
CB	6	(France) Laurent Koscielny	(substituted off) 46'
CB	21	(England) Calum Chambers
LB	3	(England) Kieran Gibbs
DM	8	(Spain) Mikel Arteta (c)
RM	17	(Chile) Alexis Sánchez	(substituted off) 46'
CM	16	(Wales) Aaron Ramsey	(substituted off) 86'
CM	10	(England) Jack Wilshere	(substituted off) 68'
LM	19	(Spain) Santi Cazorla	(substituted off) 70'
CF	22	(France) Yaya Sanogo	(substituted off) 46'
Substitutes:
GK	50	(Argentina) Emiliano Martínez
DF	18	(Spain) Nacho Monreal	(substituted on) 46'
MF	7	(Czech Republic) Tomáš Rosický	(substituted on) 70'
MF	15	(England) Alex Oxlade-Chamberlain	(substituted on) 46'
MF	20	(France) Mathieu Flamini	(substituted on) 68'
FW	12	(France) Olivier Giroud	(substituted on) 46'
FW	28	(Costa Rica) Joel Campbell	(substituted on) 86'
Manager:
(France) Arsène Wenger

GK	13	(Argentina) Willy Caballero
RB	22	(France) Gaël Clichy
CB	38	(Belgium) Dedryck Boyata
CB	33	(Serbia) Matija Nastasić
LB	11	(Serbia) Aleksandar Kolarov		(substituted off) 76'
DM	6	(Brazil) Fernando	(yellow card) 51'
DM	42	(Ivory Coast) Yaya Touré (c)		(substituted off) 60'
RW	15	(Spain) Jesús Navas		(substituted off) 85'
AM	35	(Montenegro) Stevan Jovetić
LW	8	(France) Samir Nasri		(substituted off) 46'
CF	10	(Bosnia and Herzegovina) Edin Džeko		(substituted off) 60'
Substitutes:
GK	1	(England) Joe Hart
DF	2	(England) Micah Richards		(substituted on) 76'
DF	19	(Netherlands) Karim Rekik
MF	7	(England) James Milner		(substituted on) 60'
MF	12	(England) Scott Sinclair		(substituted on) 85'
MF	21	(Spain) David Silva		(substituted on) 46'
MF	36	(Argentina) Bruno Zuculini		(substituted on) 60'
Manager:
(Chile) Manuel Pellegrini

Man of the match

- Olivier Giroud (Arsenal)

Match officials

- Assistant referees:
  - Stuart Burt (Northamptonshire)
  - Darren England (South Yorkshire)
- Fourth official: Jonathan Moss (West Yorkshire)
- Reserve official: Harry Lennard (Sussex)

Match rules

- 90 minutes
- Penalty shoot-out if scores still level
- Seven named substitutes, of which up to six may be used

=== Statistics ===
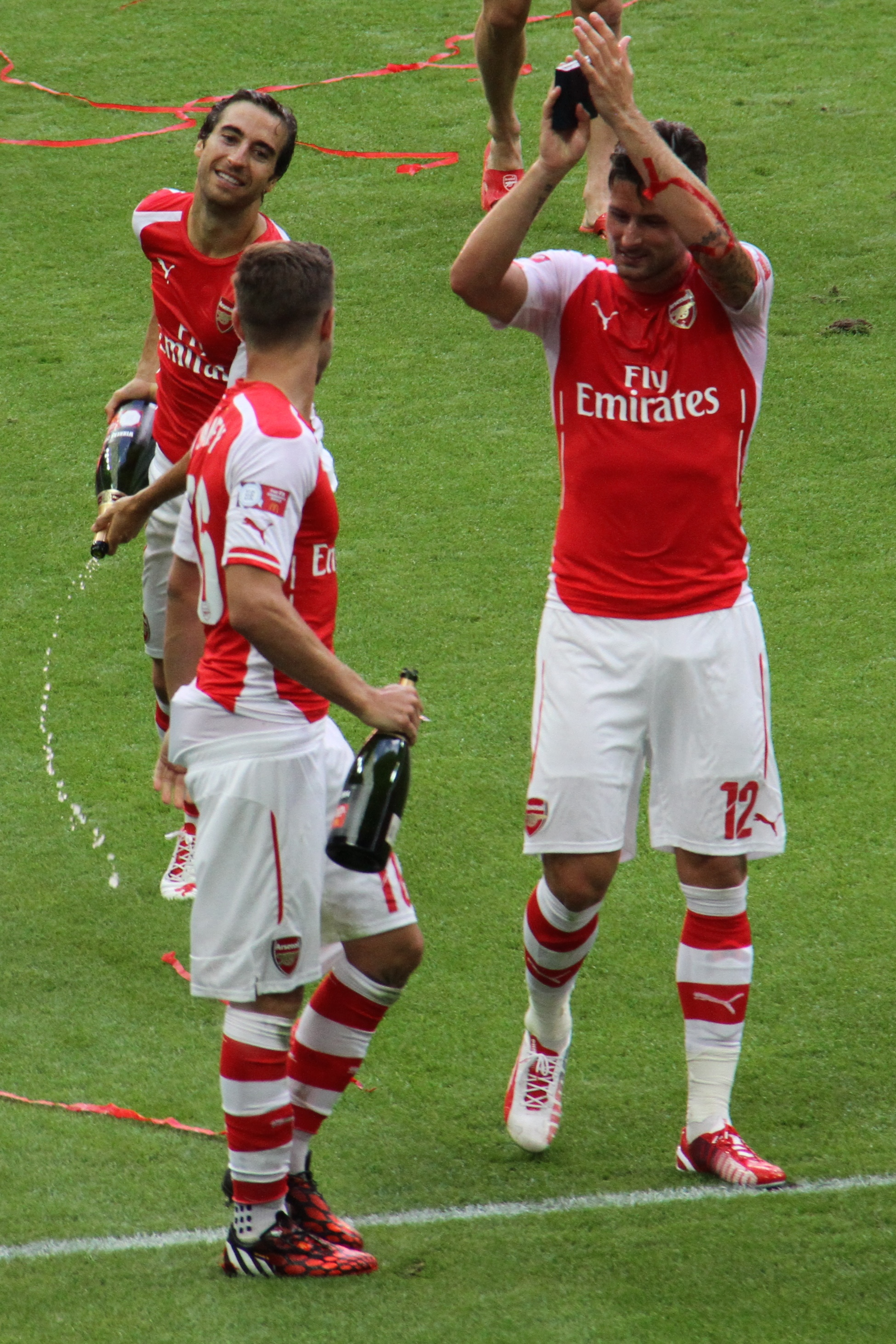
Olivier Giroud (number 12) was selected as Man of the match

Statistic	Arsenal	Manchester City
Goals scored	3	0
Possession	42%	57%
Shots on target	4	1
Shots off target	4	11
Corner kicks	3	7
Fouls	13	15
Yellow cards	0	1
Red cards	0	0

== Post-match ==
"I repeat this was a special game but during the year I don’t look at the nationality of the players. I use the players I think are the best players to win that game. It doesn’t matter where they come from."

— Manuel Pellegrini on his non-English starting XI.

The trophy was presented to Arteta by former Arsenal player and assistant coach Pat Rice. Arsenal's win marked the biggest victory in the Community Shield since 1998. Wenger was delighted with his team's performance and described their play in the first half as complete. He noted that although Arsenal lost possession in the second half and looked "less fluent", the team retained "spirit and organisation". He described the win as significant because it gave Arsenal a confidence boost going into the season and suggested it was important to beat a top-six league team because of their poor record last season. Wenger was happy with how Arsenal's new signings came through the match and reserved special praise for Chambers: "He played with a maturity and intelligence that I was really impressed with." Olivier Giroud, the man of the match, said of his goal: "I tried instinctively to shoot and to hit the target. I was a bit lucky but that's what I wanted to do."

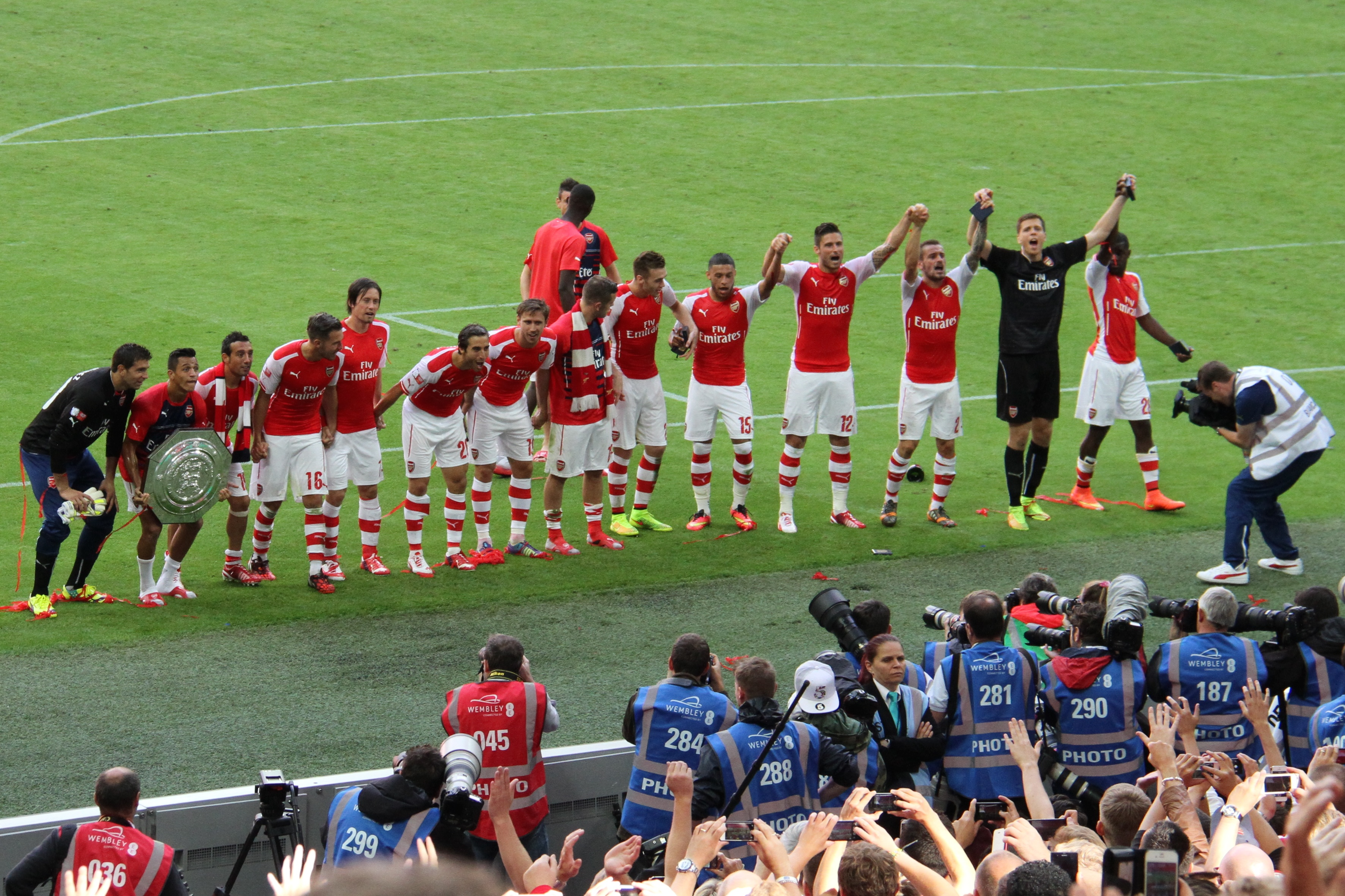
The Arsenal players celebrating their win

Pellegrini was not overly concerned by Manchester City's defeat and said: "The season starts next Sunday," referring to their league campaign. He admitted Arsenal had played the better football in the first half, but felt his team were much improved in the second – "we had possession and chances to score but we didn't." Pellegrini felt the absence of several Manchester City players had a bearing on the result and said he planned to talk to the players to get them ready for the season ahead. Of Caballero's inclusion ahead of Joe Hart, the manager said: "That was one game more for the pre-season." City's stand-in captain Touré, like his manager, was not despondent about the result; he described playing Arsenal as a "good test" for the team.

FA General Secretary Alex Horne hinted afterwards that the Community Shield could be played overseas, though not any time before 2018 because of the existing contract with Wembley Stadium. He described it as an interesting idea and told reporters: "The NBA are doing it and we know that Spanish football and Italian football are looking at doing that with their own Supercup-type games."

An average of 860,000 viewers watched the match live on BT Sport, down by almost 2,000,000 on the previous year's Community Shield which was aired on ITV. The channel's coverage peaked at 1.2 million viewers (8.4% of the audience share) during the second half.

== See also ==
- 2014–15 Premier League
- 2014–15 FA Cup
