= Alex Oxlade-Chamberlain =

English footballer (born 1993)

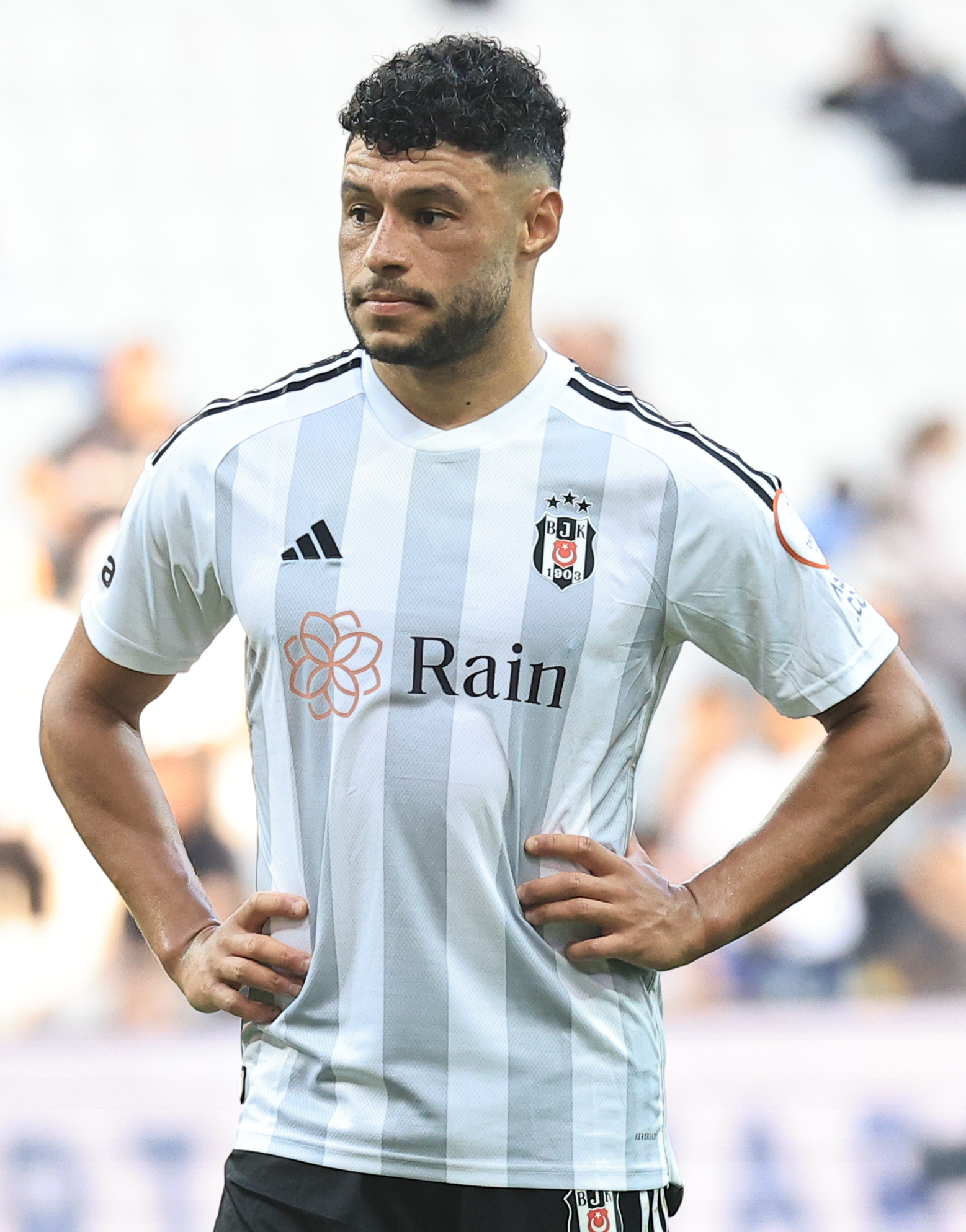
- Oxlade-Chamberlain playing for Beşiktaş in 2023

Personal information
- Full name: Alexander Mark David Oxlade-Chamberlain
- Date of birth: 15 August 1993 (age 33)
- Place of birth: Portsmouth, England
- Height: 5 ft 11 in (1.80 m)
- Position: Midfielder

Team information
- Current team: Celtic
- Number: 21

Youth career
- 2000–2010: Southampton

Senior career*
| Years | Team | Apps | (Gls) |
| 2010–2011 | Southampton | 36 | (9) |
| 2011–2017 | Arsenal | 132 | (9) |
| 2017–2023 | Liverpool | 103 | (11) |
| 2023–2025 | Beşiktaş | 38 | (5) |
| 2026– | Celtic | 16 | (3) |

International career
| 2010 | England U18 | 1 | (0) |
| 2011 | England U19 | 3 | (0) |
| 2011–2012 | England U21 | 8 | (4) |
| 2012–2019 | England | 35 | (7) |
- * Club domestic league appearances and goals as of 19:56, 21 November 2026 (UTC)

Alexander Mark David Oxlade-Chamberlain (born 15 August 1993) is an English professional footballer who plays as a midfielder for Scottish Premiership club Celtic.

After rising to prominence with Southampton during the 2010–11 season aged 17, Oxlade-Chamberlain signed for Arsenal in August 2011. Scoring twice in his first three matches for the club, Oxlade-Chamberlain became the youngest English goalscorer in UEFA Champions League history and also claimed a regular place in the England under-21 team. Over his six seasons at Arsenal, he played 198 games and scored 20 goals, winning the FA Cup three times. He signed for Liverpool in August 2017, and won the 2018–19 Champions League and 2019–20 Premier League. In 2023 he joined Turkish club Beşiktaş, and was released in 2025.

Oxlade-Chamberlain made his debut for the England national team in May 2012 in a 1–0 friendly win against Norway. Following this, he received a surprise call-up to the England squad for UEFA Euro 2012 and became the second youngest player ever to represent England in the European Championships. He was also called up for the 2014 FIFA World Cup. He has made 35 appearances for the national team, most recently in 2019, scoring seven goals.

== Early and personal life ==
Alexander Mark David Oxlade-Chamberlain was born on 15 August 1993 in Portsmouth, Hampshire. He is the son of former Stoke City, Portsmouth and England international player Mark Chamberlain. His uncle, Neville Chamberlain, was also a professional footballer, as is his younger brother, Christian. Oxlade-Chamberlain is of Jamaican descent through his paternal grandparents.

Oxlade-Chamberlain attended the independent St John's College in Southsea, Portsmouth. He grew up as an Arsenal supporter. He played rugby union as a scrum half or full back and nearly chose that sport over football when he was offered a trial at London Irish. He also played cricket as a wicketkeeper, bowler and opening batsman with south east Hampshire. He was offered trials as a wicketkeeper batsman with Hampshire, but declined because it conflicted with his youth footballing duties.

In February 2017, Oxlade-Chamberlain was confirmed to be dating singer Perrie Edwards of the girl group Little Mix. In August 2021, they had their first child, a son. In June 2022, the couple announced their engagement. In 2025, Edwards revealed that the couple had suffered a miscarriage at 24 weeks' gestation in May 2022. Their second child, a daughter, was born in January 2026. Oxlade‑Chamberlain and Edwards were married in Portugal in June 2026.

== Club career ==
=== Southampton ===
Oxlade-Chamberlain joined the Southampton Academy at the age of seven. On 2 March 2010, he made his first-team debut for Southampton, at 16 years 199 days, coming off the bench in a 5–0 victory over Huddersfield Town and became the club's second youngest ever appearance maker behind Theo Walcott. Oxlade-Chamberlain appeared as an 82nd-minute substitute for Jason Puncheon on 8 May 2010 in the final match of the season against Southend United. At the beginning of the 2010–11 season, Oxlade-Chamberlain made his first competitive start on 10 August against AFC Bournemouth in the first round of the League Cup. During the match, he scored the second goal of Southampton's 2–0 victory, his first senior goal.

On 20 August 2010, shortly after his 17th birthday, Oxlade-Chamberlain signed his first professional contract lasting for three years. His first league start came in a 2–0 defeat at home to Rochdale on 4 September 2010. His first league goal came in a 2–1 victory over Oldham Athletic on 23 October 2010, which proved to be the match winner. He scored two more goals and also got an assist in a 4–0 win over Dagenham & Redbridge on 2 November 2010, when he was voted Man of the Match in a league match for the first time.

Oxlade-Chamberlain finished the season with nine goals as Southampton were promoted to the Championship; he was named in the PFA League One Team of the Year for the 2010–11 season. He was subsequently the subject of transfer speculation and in June his father, Mark Chamberlain, stated he was eager for his son to join Arsenal "as soon as possible" to "continue his development".

=== Arsenal ===
==== 2011–12 season ====
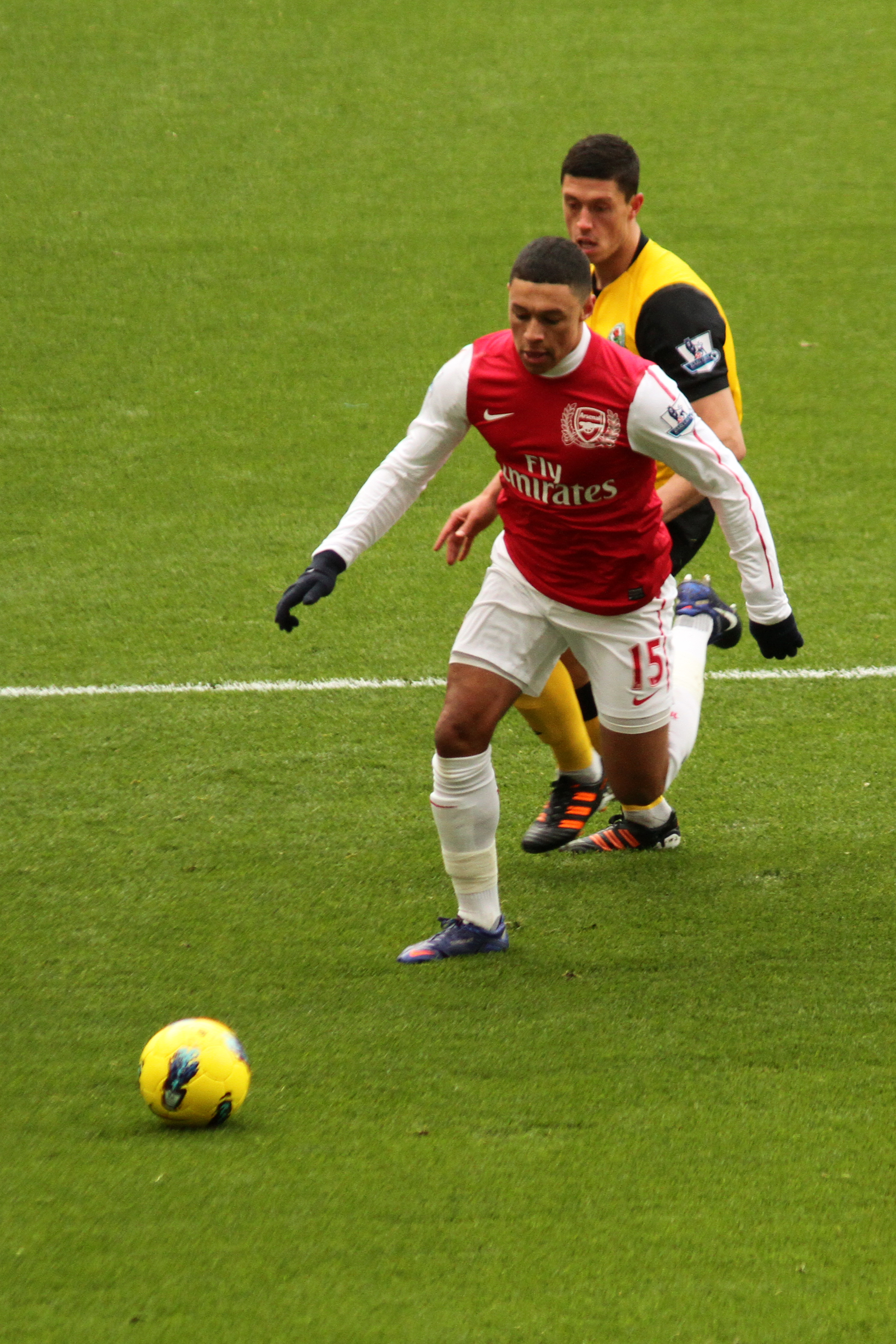
Oxlade-Chamberlain (in red shirt) playing for Arsenal in 2012

On 8 August 2011, Oxlade-Chamberlain signed for Premier League club Arsenal. Although neither club involved revealed details of the contractual arrangements, press sources indicated that the fee was a £12 million initial payment which could rise to £15 million with "add-ons".

On 28 August 2011, he made his Arsenal debut in the 8–2 defeat away to Manchester United, as a 62nd-minute substitute for Francis Coquelin, thus becoming the 150th player to represent Arsenal in the Premier League. On 20 September 2011, he scored his first goal for Arsenal in the 58th minute of a League Cup match against Shrewsbury Town, with a drive from 25 yards. Arsenal won 3–1.

On 28 September 2011, Oxlade-Chamberlain scored the opening goal in the eighth minute of his UEFA Champions League debut against Greek team Olympiacos, running diagonally onto an Alex Song long pass and past several defenders before finishing into the corner of the goal. In so doing, he became the youngest Englishman to score in the Champions League, surpassing teammate Theo Walcott's record.

Oxlade-Chamberlain started his first Premier League match for Arsenal in a 2–1 defeat to Manchester United at the Emirates Stadium on 22 January 2012, contributing an assist to a Robin van Persie goal. Arsène Wenger replaced him with Andrey Arshavin in the 78th minute, with the score at 1–1. Not only did Arsenal fans boo the decision to take Oxlade-Chamberlain off, Van Persie also remonstrated with the manager. On 4 February 2012, Oxlade-Chamberlain celebrated his first two Premier League goals in a home match against Blackburn Rovers which finished in a 7–1 victory to Arsenal. Following this match, Wenger praised Oxlade-Chamberlain for his fast development.

After the second leg of the Champions League second round against AC Milan, Oxlade-Chamberlain earned many plaudits for his impressive run of form, and for his display against strong European opposition; he was described by Marco van Basten as a "gem", while then-Arsenal captain Robin van Persie stated Oxlade-Chamberlain was the future of both Arsenal and England.

At the end of his first season in the Premier League, Oxlade-Chamberlain was nominated for PFA Young Player of the Year; he was the youngest player on the shortlist and he eventually lost out to Tottenham Hotspur's Kyle Walker, three years his senior.

==== 2012–13 season ====
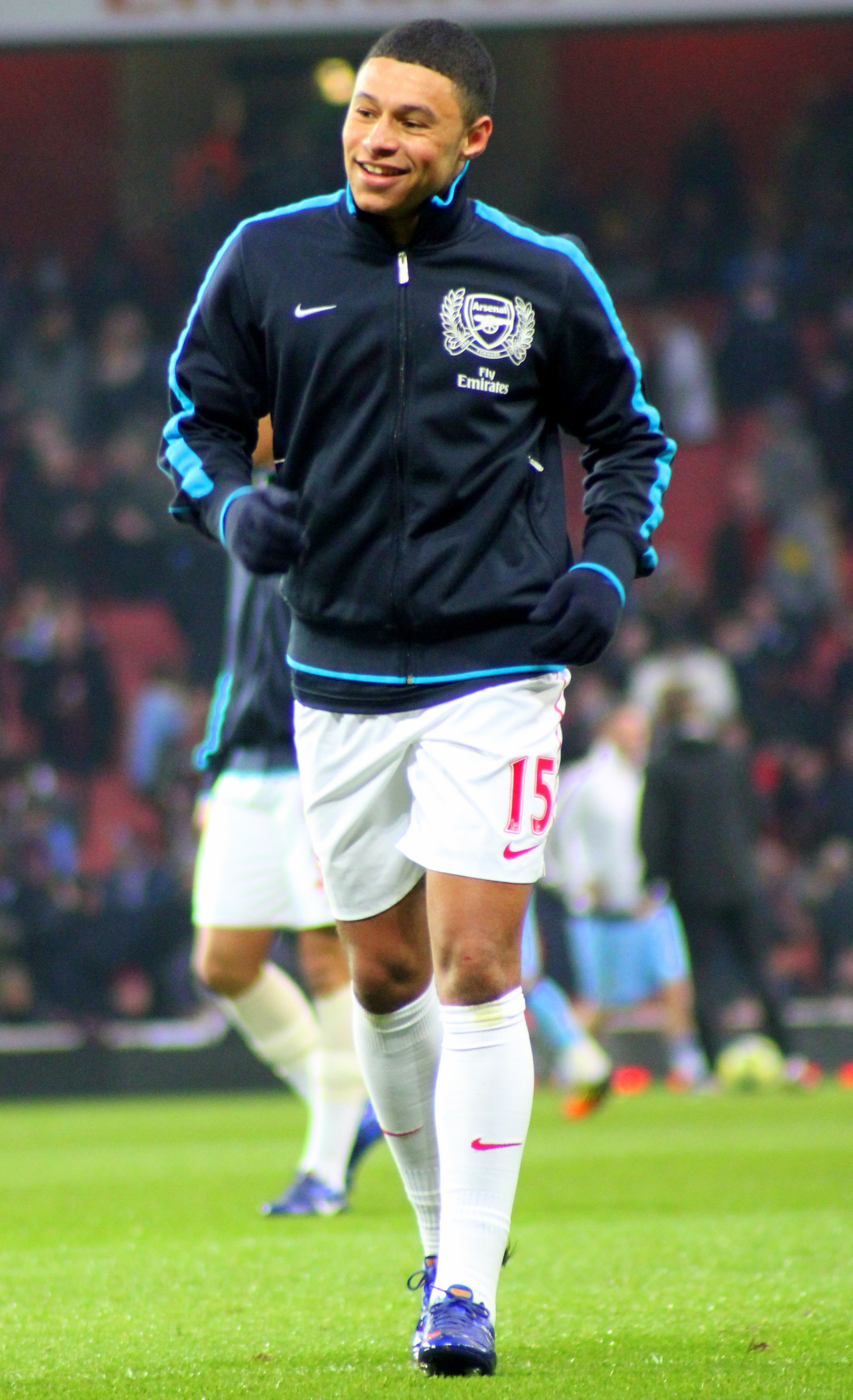
Oxlade-Chamberlain warming up for Arsenal in 2012

Oxlade-Chamberlain scored his first goal of the 2012–13 season from 25 yards out in a 6–1 home victory over Coventry City in the League Cup.

On 19 December 2012, Oxlade-Chamberlain signed a new long-term contract with Arsenal. Oxlade-Chamberlain scored his only Premier League goal of the 2012–13 season in a 7–3 home win against Newcastle United.

==== 2013–14 season ====
On the opening day of the 2013–14 season, Oxlade-Chamberlain assisted Olivier Giroud's goal in a 3–1 defeat at home to Aston Villa, however he came off injured and it was later revealed he would be out for between six weeks and three months, missing England's remaining World Cup qualifiers against Poland and Montenegro.

On 2 February, Oxlade-Chamberlain scored his first two goals of the season in Arsenal's 2–0 win over Crystal Palace. Oxlade-Chamberlain missed the last few weeks of the season, including the 2014 FA Cup final, after picking up a groin injury.

==== 2014–2016 ====
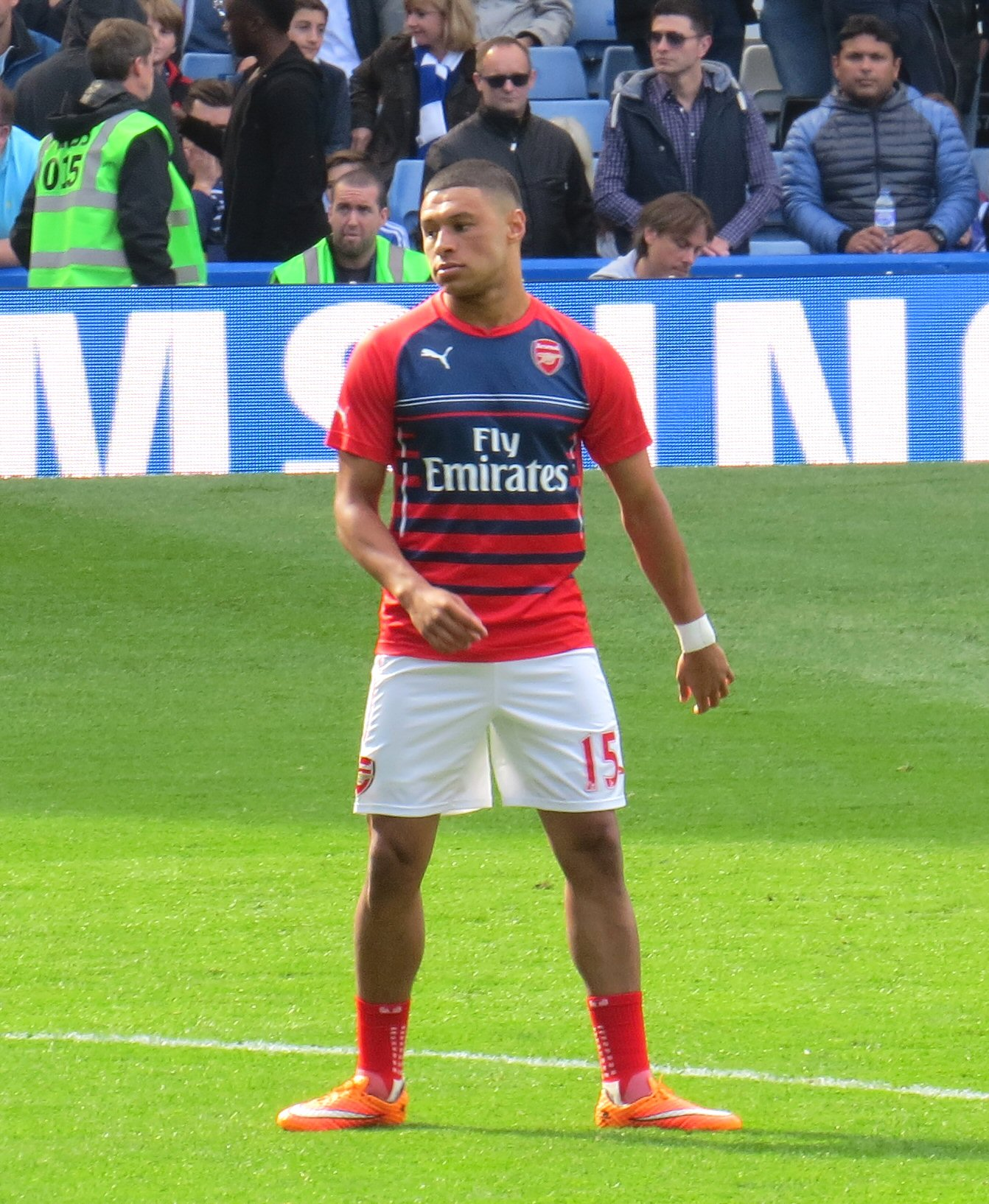
Oxlade-Chamberlain warming up for Arsenal in 2014

Oxlade-Chamberlain began the season by winning the 2014 FA Community Shield with Arsenal beating Manchester City 3–0 at Wembley Stadium. On 27 September, he scored in the North London derby in a 1–1 draw against Tottenham. On 4 November, he scored to put Arsenal 3–0 up against RSC Anderlecht in the Champions League, although the match eventually finished 3–3. He also scored in the round of 16 match against Monaco in February. Two matches later, he was injured in a 2–1 win against Manchester United in the FA Cup and had to be withdrawn just after half-time. It was later confirmed that he would be out for three to four weeks due to the hamstring injury. On 30 May 2015, Oxlade-Chamberlain came on as a substitute in the 2015 FA Cup final and set up Olivier Giroud to make it 4–0; the final score against Aston Villa at Wembley Stadium.

On 2 August 2015, Oxlade-Chamberlain scored the only goal in a 1–0 victory over Chelsea in the Community Shield. His only league goal that season came away to Bournemouth, the first goal he scored for Arsenal in a league match away from home. On 23 February 2016, he suffered a serious knee injury in a 2–0 home defeat by Barcelona in the Champions League, which was initially expected to prevent him playing for up to eight weeks. A further injury in May during training prevented his return for the rest of the season, including the summer UEFA Euro 2016 tournament.

==== 2016–17 season ====
Oxlade-Chamberlain started on the bench for Arsenal's opening day defeat to Liverpool, however Oxlade-Chamberlain replaced the injured Alex Iwobi to score Arsenal's second goal in a 3–4 defeat. Oxlade-Chamberlain also created an assist for Olivier Giroud's last-minute equaliser at Old Trafford as Arsenal sealed a 1–1 draw with Manchester United. Oxlade-Chamberlain also scored a goal against West Ham United and created an assist for a goal from Alexis Sánchez in Arsenal's first away match at the London Stadium, where they won 5–1. He scored three times in Arsenal's 2016–17 EFL Cup campaign where they reached the quarter-finals of the tournament.

On 23 April, Oxlade-Chamberlain won the man of the Match Award in the FA Cup semi-final against Manchester City, having provided an assist for Nacho Monreal to score an equaliser. This was his second match in a new wing-back role. He also provided assists for both goals in a 2–0 win in the home fixture against Manchester United on 7 May.

=== Liverpool ===
==== 2017–18 season ====
On 31 August 2017, Oxlade-Chamberlain signed a five-year contract with Arsenal's Premier League rivals Liverpool for a £35 million fee. On 9 September 2017, Oxlade-Chamberlain made his debut for Liverpool, coming on as a substitute in a 5–0 loss to Manchester City. He scored his first goal for the club on 17 October, coming off the bench to score in a 7–0 Champions League win over Maribor, a result which was the joint-largest ever away win in the competition, and the largest away win by an English club. On 4 November 2017, he scored his first league goal for Liverpool in a 4–1 victory over West Ham. On 14 January 2018, he scored the first goal in his side's 4–3 victory over Manchester City, ending their unbeaten run in the Premier League that season.

On 25 April 2018, Oxlade-Chamberlain suffered a serious injury to his knee in the 15th minute of the Champions League semi-final first leg 5–2 victory against Roma, which prevented him playing further during the season, or participating in the 2018 FIFA World Cup.

==== 2018–19 season ====
On 18 July, Liverpool confirmed that Oxlade-Chamberlain would miss the majority of the 2018–19 season, with manager Jürgen Klopp stating: "It feels like now is an appropriate time to tell people that for Ox this coming season will be about focusing on recovery and rehab".

On 28 December, Klopp stated that Oxlade-Chamberlain's rehabilitation was going "ahead of schedule" and that "if he makes further steps like he did in the last few weeks then he can play Premier League football this season, which is nice to know". On 26 April 2019, 366 days after his injury, Oxlade-Chamberlain made his return as a substitute in Liverpool's 5–0 league win over Huddersfield. He was an unused substitute for the 2019 Champions League final against Tottenham Hotspur. Ahead of the 2019–20 Premier League season, Oxlade-Chamberlain changed his Liverpool squad number from 21 to 15 following the departure of Daniel Sturridge, which was the number he wore during his time at Arsenal. Oxlade-Chamberlain personally paid out of his own pocket to reimburse and exchange replica shirts for any fans who had already purchased a 2019–20 jersey printed with "Chamberlain 21".

==== 2019–2023 ====
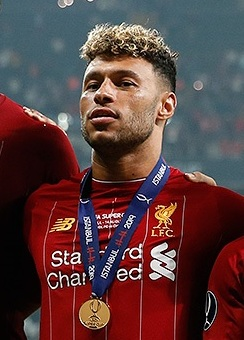
Oxlade-Chamberlain after winning the 2019 UEFA Super Cup with Liverpool

On 22 August, Oxlade-Chamberlain signed an extension to his contract. Back to fitness following the extensive rehabilitation, in late October and early November, Oxlade-Chamberlain scored three Champions League goals in the space of two weeks against Genk, as well as a long-range effort against former club Arsenal in the League Cup on 30 October. He scored his first league goal of the season the following month, slotting home a ball from Jordan Henderson to provide the first in a 3–0 away win over Bournemouth, on 7 December. Exactly two weeks later, on 21 December, Oxlade-Chamberlain started for Liverpool in the 2019 FIFA Club World Cup final against Flamengo, playing 75 minutes until he was forced off due to an injury after "falling awkwardly on his ankle"; Klopp later confirmed that Oxlade-Chamberlain would miss the remaining two games of 2019, as he sustained "damage to his ankle ligament". Oxlade-Chamberlain later scored the fifth goal in Liverpool's 5–3 win over Chelsea on 22 July, their final home game of the season.

Oxlade-Chamberlain suffered a knee injury on 21 August 2020, during a pre-season camp in Austria. On 19 May 2021, Oxlade-Chamberlain scored his first goal of the season coming off the bench in 3–0 away win over Burnley. On 17 May 2023, Liverpool announced that Oxlade-Chamberlain would leave the club at the end of the season upon the expiry of his contract.

=== Beşiktaş ===
On 14 August 2023, Oxlade-Chamberlain signed for Süper Lig club Beşiktaş on a three-year contract.

On 21 December 2023 in the match against Alanyaspor, Oxlade-Chamberlain was injured and suffered a tear in his posterior thigh muscle and was expected to be out of action for four months.

Ahead of the 2024–25 Süper Lig season, Oxlade-Chamberlain was frozen out of the club by then manager Giovanni van Bronckhorst, and did not feature for the club until 2 December 2024. He was also left out of their Europa League squad for the league phase. On 27 August 2025, Beşiktaş confirmed that they had terminated his contract, paying him a severance fee of €1.75 million.

=== Celtic ===
After a short period training with the Arsenal first team, on 7 February 2026, Oxlade-Chamberlain signed for Celtic on a six-month contract, with an option to extend for a further year. He made his debut four days later, coming off the bench against Livingston and scored the winning goal in stoppage time in a 2–1 win at Celtic Park. He won both the Scottish Premiership and the Scottish Cup in his first season. On 4 July 2026, it was announced that he had signed a new one year contract with the club.

== International career ==
=== Youth teams ===
Oxlade-Chamberlain was called up to the England under-18 squad for the match against Poland which took place on 16 November 2010 at Adams Park. England won the match 3–0 and Oxlade-Chamberlain played the first 45 minutes before he was substituted.

He was called up to the England Under-19 squad to face Germany on 8 February 2011, but on 2 February he was promoted into the England under-21 team for a friendly match away to Italy on 8 February. In the match, he came on as a 60th-minute substitute, replacing Henri Lansbury. England lost the match 1–0 with the Italians scoring from a penalty two minutes from time.

Oxlade-Chamberlain made his first start for the Under-21s against Azerbaijan on 1 September 2011 and claimed two assists during the game. He also made a brief appearance against Israel on 5 September, coming on in the second half to claim three assists (including winning a penalty) to push England from a 1–0 deficit to a 4–1 comeback victory. A month later, he scored a hat-trick against Iceland as England won 3–0 in Reykjavík. On 10 November 2011, Oxlade-Chamberlain played in 5–0 win for the under-21s against Iceland, to remain top of Group 8. On 29 February 2012, he netted a late penalty as England made certain of at least a play-off spot for the 2013 UEFA European Under-21 Championship with a 4–0 victory over Belgium.

=== Senior team ===
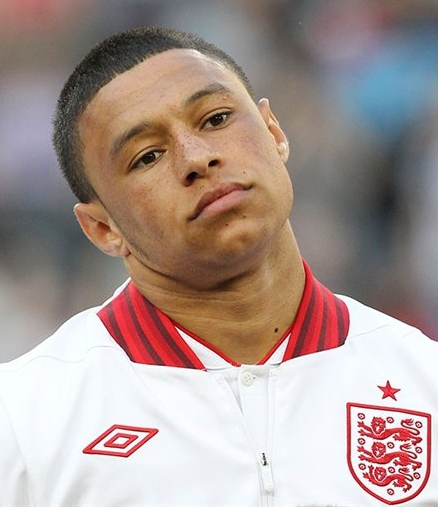
Oxlade-Chamberlain lining up for England at UEFA Euro 2012

On 16 May 2012, Oxlade-Chamberlain was called up to the 23-man senior England squad for UEFA Euro 2012, to be held in Poland and Ukraine. He made his debut for the senior England team on 26 May 2012 in a 1–0 win against Norway in a warm-up match, coming on as a substitute for Ashley Young in the second half. He made his first senior start for England on 2 June playing 66 minutes before being replaced by Theo Walcott in a 1–0 win against Belgium at Wembley Stadium, another warm-up match, and England's final match before the tournament. On 11 June, he made his major international tournament debut when he started in England's opening match of the Euro 2012 tournament against France.

On 12 October 2012, Oxlade-Chamberlain scored his first senior international goal, in a 5–0 victory over San Marino. He scored again in the return match against San Marino on 22 March 2013, which England won 8–0.

On 2 June 2013, he scored against Brazil in the official opening of the refurbished Maracanã Stadium, with the match finishing 2–2. He came on as a second-half substitute and scored with a half-volley to bring the score to 1–1.

On 16 May 2018, he was left out of Gareth Southgate's 23-man England squad for the 2018 FIFA World Cup due to injury.

== Career statistics ==
=== Club ===
As of match played 21 November 2026

Appearances and goals by club, season and competition
| Club | Season | League | | | National cup (Note: Includes FA Cup, Turkish Cup, Scottish Cup) | | League cup (Note: Includes Football League/EFL Cup, Scottish League Cup) | | Europe | | Other | | Total | |
| Club | Season | Division | Apps | Goals | Apps | Goals | Apps | Goals | Apps | Goals | Apps | Goals | Apps | Goals |
|---|---|---|---|---|---|---|---|---|---|---|---|---|---|---|
| Southampton | 2009–10 | League One | 2 | 0 | 0 | 0 | 0 | 0 | — | | 0 | 0 | 2 | 0 |
| Southampton | 2010–11 | League One | 34 | 9 | 4 | 0 | 2 | 1 | — | | 1 (Note: Appearance in Football League Trophy) | 0 | 41 | 10 |
| Southampton | Total | | 36 | 9 | 4 | 0 | 2 | 1 | — | | 1 | 0 | 43 | 10 |
| Arsenal | 2011–12 | Premier League | 16 | 2 | 3 | 0 | 3 | 1 | 4 (Note: Appearance(s) in UEFA Champions League) | 1 | — | | 26 | 4 |
| Arsenal | 2012–13 | Premier League | 25 | 1 | 2 | 0 | 2 | 1 | 4 | 0 | — | | 33 | 2 |
| Arsenal | 2013–14 | Premier League | 14 | 2 | 4 | 1 | 0 | 0 | 2 | 0 | — | | 20 | 3 |
| Arsenal | 2014–15 | Premier League | 23 | 1 | 3 | 0 | 1 | 0 | 9 | 2 | 1 (Note: Appearance in FA Community Shield) | 0 | 37 | 3 |
| Arsenal | 2015–16 | Premier League | 22 | 1 | 3 | 0 | 2 | 0 | 5 | 0 | 1 | 1 | 33 | 2 |
| Arsenal | 2016–17 | Premier League | 29 | 2 | 6 | 0 | 3 | 3 | 7 | 1 | — | | 45 | 6 |
| Arsenal | 2017–18 | Premier League | 3 | 0 | — | | — | | — | | 1 | 0 | 4 | 0 |
| Arsenal | Total | | 132 | 9 | 21 | 1 | 11 | 5 | 31 | 4 | 3 | 1 | 198 | 20 |
| Liverpool | 2017–18 | Premier League | 32 | 3 | 2 | 0 | 1 | 0 | 7 | 2 | — | | 42 | 5 |
| Liverpool | 2018–19 | Premier League | 2 | 0 | 0 | 0 | 0 | 0 | 0 | 0 | — | | 2 | 0 |
| Liverpool | 2019–20 | Premier League | 30 | 4 | 2 | 0 | 2 | 1 | 5 | 3 | 4 (Note: One appearance in FA Community Shield, one appearance in UEFA Super Cup, two appearances in FIFA Club World Cup) | 0 | 43 | 8 |
| Liverpool | 2020–21 | Premier League | 13 | 1 | 1 | 0 | 0 | 0 | 3 | 0 | — | | 17 | 1 |
| Liverpool | 2021–22 | Premier League | 17 | 2 | 2 | 0 | 4 | 1 | 6 | 0 | — | | 29 | 3 |
| Liverpool | 2022–23 | Premier League | 9 | 1 | 1 | 0 | 2 | 0 | 1 | 0 | 0 | 0 | 13 | 1 |
| Liverpool | Total | | 103 | 11 | 8 | 0 | 9 | 2 | 22 | 5 | 4 | 0 | 146 | 18 |
| Beşiktaş | 2023–24 | Süper Lig | 20 | 4 | 2 | 0 | — | | 8 (Note: Appearances in UEFA Europa Conference League) | 0 | — | | 30 | 4 |
| Beşiktaş | 2024–25 | Süper Lig | 18 | 1 | 2 | 0 | — | | 0 | 0 | 0 | 0 | 20 | 1 |
| Beşiktaş | 2025–26 | Süper Lig | 0 | 0 | — | | — | | 0 | 0 | — | | 0 | 0 |
| Beşiktaş | Total | | 38 | 5 | 4 | 0 | — | | 8 | 0 | 0 | 0 | 50 | 5 |
| Celtic | 2025–26 | Scottish Premiership | 9 | 2 | 3 | 0 | — | | 0 | 0 | — | | 12 | 2 |
| Celtic | 2026–27 | Scottish Premiership | 7 | 1 | 0 | 0 | 2 | 0 | 1 (Note: Appearance in UEFA Europa League) | 0 | — | | 10 | 1 |
| Celtic | Total | | 16 | 3 | 3 | 0 | 2 | 0 | 1 | 0 | — | | 22 | 3 |
| Career total | | | 325 | 37 | 40 | 1 | 24 | 8 | 62 | 9 | 8 | 1 | 459 | 56 |

=== International ===
Appearances and goals by national team and year
| National team | Year | Apps | Goals |
|---|---|---|---|
| England | 2012 | 9 | 1 |
| England | 2013 | 4 | 2 |
| England | 2014 | 7 | 1 |
| England | 2015 | 4 | 1 |
| England | 2016 | 0 | 0 |
| England | 2017 | 6 | 1 |
| England | 2018 | 2 | 0 |
| England | 2019 | 3 | 1 |
| Total | | 35 | 7 |

England score listed first, score column indicates score after each Oxlade-Chamberlain goal

List of international goals scored by Alex Oxlade-Chamberlain
| No. | Date | Venue | Cap | Opponent | Score | Result | Competition | Ref. |
|---|---|---|---|---|---|---|---|---|
| 1 | 12 October 2012 | Wembley Stadium, London, England | 8 | San Marino | 5–0 | 5–0 | 2014 FIFA World Cup qualification | |
| 2 | 22 March 2013 | Stadio Olimpico di San Marino, Serravalle, San Marino | 10 | San Marino | 2–0 | 8–0 | 2014 FIFA World Cup qualification | |
| 3 | 2 June 2013 | Maracanã Stadium, Rio de Janeiro, Brazil | 12 | Brazil | 1–1 | 2–2 | Friendly | |
| 4 | 18 November 2014 | Celtic Park, Glasgow, Scotland | 20 | Scotland | 1–0 | 3–1 | Friendly | |
| 5 | 12 October 2015 | LFF Stadium, Vilnius, Lithuania | 24 | Lithuania | 3–0 | 3–0 | UEFA Euro 2016 qualifying | |
| 6 | 10 June 2017 | Hampden Park, Glasgow, Scotland | 26 | Scotland | 1–0 | 2–2 | 2018 FIFA World Cup qualification | |
| 7 | 14 November 2019 | Wembley Stadium, London, England | 34 | Montenegro | 1–0 | 7–0 | UEFA Euro 2020 qualifying | |

== Honours ==
Southampton

- Football League One second-place promotion: 2010–11

Arsenal

- FA Cup: 2013–14, 2014–15, 2016–17
- FA Community Shield: 2014, 2015, 2017

Liverpool

- Premier League: 2019–20
- EFL Cup: 2021–22
- UEFA Champions League: 2018–19; runner-up: 2021–22
- UEFA Super Cup: 2019
- FIFA Club World Cup: 2019

Beşiktaş

- Turkish Cup: 2023–24

Celtic

- Scottish Premiership: 2025–26
- Scottish Cup: 2025–26

Individual

- PFA Team of the Year: 2010–11 League One
- Liverpool Goal of the Season: 2017–18
