= 2013–14 Arsenal F.C. season =

English football club season

Arsenal
2013–14 season
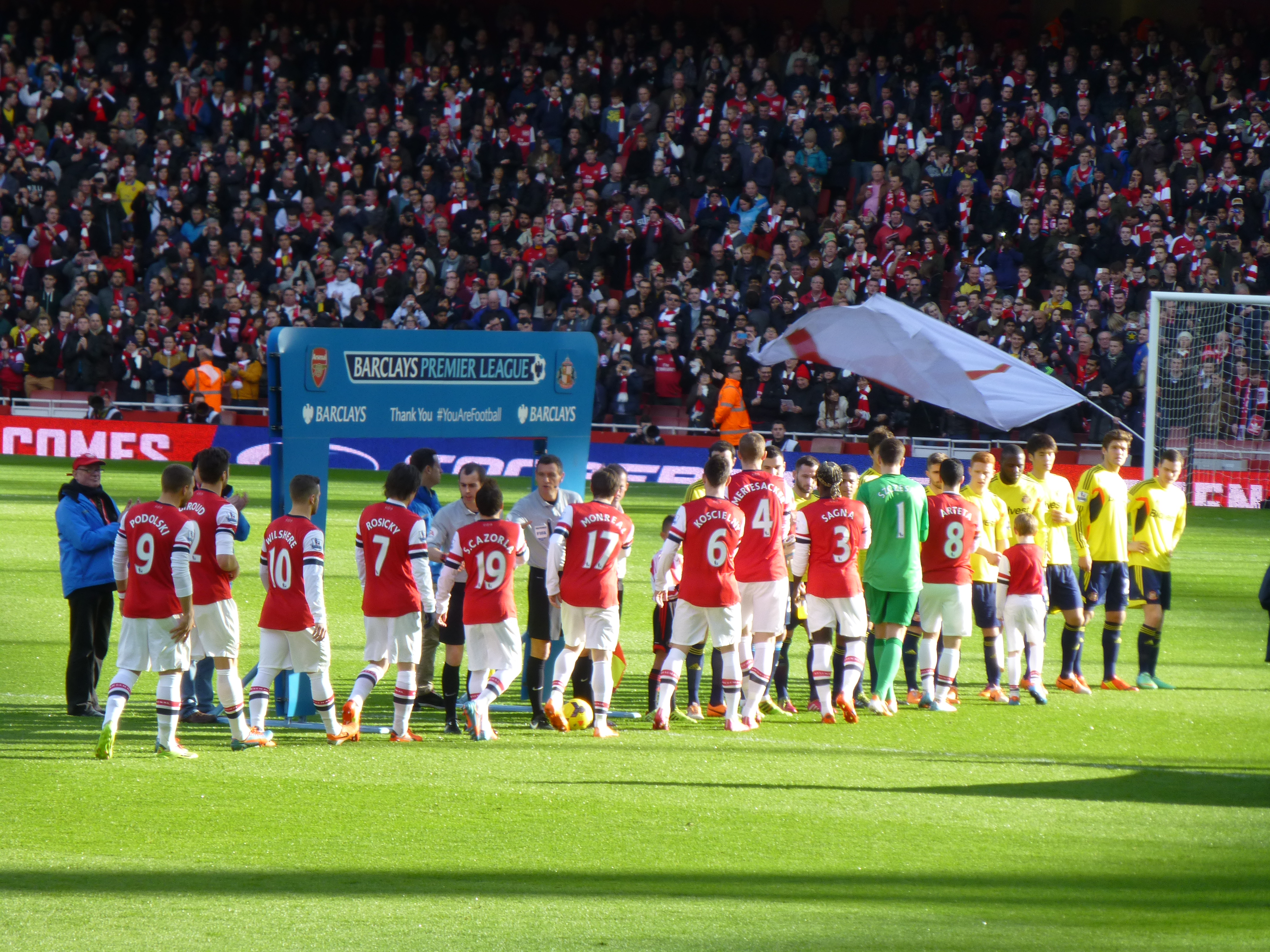
- Arsenal players shaking hands with Sunderland players before their game
- Chairman: Sir Chips Keswick
- Manager: Arsène Wenger
- Stadium: Emirates Stadium
- Premier League: 4th
- FA Cup: Winners
- League Cup: Fourth round
- UEFA Champions League: Round of 16
- Top goalscorer: League: Olivier Giroud (16); All: Olivier Giroud (22)
- Highest home attendance: 60,071 (vs. Tottenham Hotspur, 1 September 2013, Premier League)
- Lowest home attendance: 56,271 (vs. Fenerbahçe, 27 August 2013, UEFA Champions League)
- Average home league attendance: 59,487
Home colours	Away colours

The 2013–14 season was Arsenal Football Club's 22nd season in the Premier League and 88th consecutive season in the top flight of English football. Arsenal participated in the Premier League, FA Cup, League Cup and the UEFA Champions League, after finishing fourth in the previous Premier League season. Despite an opening day 1–3 league defeat at home to Aston Villa, which exacerbated underlying anger at the club's inactivity in the transfer market, Arsenal's league campaign got off to a strong start. Early pace-setters in the title race, Arsenal led the table for much of the season, spending more time on top of the league than any other side. However, a combination of injuries to key players and heavy defeats away from home against other title challengers saw the Gunners' title ambitions evaporate by late March. Nonetheless, Arsenal achieved success in the FA Cup with a dramatic 3–2 win over Hull City in the 2014 Final, ending a nine-year trophy drought.

== Review ==
=== Background ===
In November 2012, Arsenal extended their shirt sponsorship deal with the airline Emirates until 2019 with the Emirates Stadium's naming rights contract also being extended until 2028. It was later announced in January 2013 that Arsenal's home ticket prices would be frozen at the 2012–13 prices for the 2013–14 season. This came after criticism of prices from Arsenal supporters as well as visiting fans, as Arsenal's prices were revealed as one of the highest in world football. However, Arsenal's kit manufacturer was still in doubt as Nike's sponsorship deal ended at the end of the season. In May 2013, it was reported that Puma had signed a five-year deal for an estimated £170 million over the period, a deal that would become the most lucrative kit manufacturer partnership in English football. It will also end a 20-year spell with American sportswear designer Nike. Arsenal had announced the partnership with Puma will be effective from 1 July 2014.

Aside from football on the pitch, Arsenal announced that club legend Freddie Ljungberg would be "renewing his ties with the club" by taking an ambassadorial role with the view of increasing the international awareness for the club. Ljungberg, who was famously a part of the "Invincibles" team, said that he was "honoured to take on this ambassadorial role." In addition, Sir Chips Keswick was appointed as the new club chairman following the 31-year-incumbency of Peter Hill-Wood as chairman, as Hill-Wood resigned following a heart attack the previous year. Though it ended a Hill-Wood association with Arsenal since 1927 (as his grandfather and father were also chairmen of Arsenal Football Club), he stated that he knows "Sir Chips is the right person to take the Club forward."

=== Pre-season ===
Arsenal announced plans to play a pre-season friendly in Indonesia's capital Jakarta against the Indonesia national team on 1 November 2012, with the match being played on 14 July 2013. This was to be part of Arsenal's third consecutive Asian tour, in anticipation of the growing fan base in the continent. Arsenal's match in Indonesia was the first time the club played in the country since 1982. Arsenal also announced plans to play in Vietnam's capital Hanoi, in a match that would see the first Premier League team to play a friendly there. In addition, in March 2013, it was announced that Arsenal would play Arsène Wenger's former club, Nagoya Grampus in Japan on 22 July, as well as another Japanese game against Urawa Red Diamonds, extending the Asia tour to four games.

Arsenal also hosted the Emirates Cup in the Emirates Stadium for the first time since 2011, after the 2012 edition was cancelled due to the 2012 Summer Olympics causing infrastructure problems in London, which hosted the event. It was confirmed on 15 May 2013 that Turkish Süper Lig side, Galatasaray and Serie A side Napoli were to be Arsenal's opponents, although this did not receive a good reception from Arsenal fans after the 2000 UEFA Cup Final riots where Arsenal and Galatasaray fans clashed in Copenhagen, Denmark before the UEFA Cup Final. The third side was Porto, who played their two games against Arsenal's two opponents. Arsenal's final pre-season friendly was against fellow Premier League side Manchester City in Helsinki seven days before the season is set to begin. This meant a total of seven pre-season games for the Gunners. It was also reported in 2012 that, after Arsenal postponed a planned friendly with Nigeria in August 2012, the Gunners would play Nigeria in Abuja Stadium in 2013, however, this did not materialise.

Arsenal started their pre-season tour with various promotional activities, including a signing session and television appearances, ahead of their friendly against the Indonesia Dream Team. Arsenal led at half-time 1–0 with the first goal of the season coming from Theo Walcott, with bright displays from Aaron Ramsey and Serge Gnabry. However, it was in the second half that the Gunners began firing, as goals from youngsters Akpom, Olsson and Eisfeld and established players Podolski and Giroud (2) meant Arsenal began their pre-season preparations with an emphatic 7–0 win. Continuing the tour, various Arsenal team members visited numerous tourist attractions in Hanoi, whilst which a Vietnamese Arsenal fan, Vũ Xuân Tiến, ran five miles (eight kilometers) alongside the club's touring bus before eventually being called up by Arsenal's players for pictures; he was subsequently dubbed the "Running Man" by Vietnamese and international media. Arsenal's second pre-season game was against Vietnam, where the Gunners again managed to score seven goals, as Giroud's hat-trick brought his pre-season tally to five. The remaining goals came from youngsters Oxlade-Chamberlain, Akpom and Miquel, with Mạnh Dũng scoring the first goal Arsenal conceded in the season. Arsenal then travelled to Japan to play in a two-part tour involving Wenger's old club Nagoya Grampus, where the Gunners ran out 3–1 winners (with goals from Walcott, Giroud (his sixth for the tour) and Miyaichi) and Urawa Red Diamonds, where a late Chuba Akpom goal kept up Arsenal's 100% record in pre-season as a 2–1 win ensured the Gunners won all four of their Asia Tour matches.

Arsenal then began their ventures in the Emirates Cup, where a Galatasary 1–0 win earlier over Porto, and a 2–2 draw for the Gunners against Napoli (with goals for Frenchmen Giroud and Koscielny for Arsenal), meant Arsenal ended Day 1 second in the table, one point behind their next opponents Galatasary. Arsenal were on course to win the Emirates Cup for a fourth time whilst they led 1–0 against Galatasaray, however old foe Didier Drogba scored two late goals as a 2–1 defeat for the Gunners left them in last place in the table. Arsenal did however, end their pre-season in encouraging fashion, as an goals of exquisite quality from Walcott, Ramsey and Giroud (his 8th in pre-season) capped a brilliant 3–1 victory over Premier League rivals Manchester City in Helsinki. Arsenal finished their pre-season preparations with 25 goals scored and 8 goals conceded spread over eight games and 11 different goals scorers

==== Transfers ====
On 30 May 2013, Arsenal announced they were to release 10 reserve team players, three of whom made first-team appearances for the Gunners (Conor Henderson, Jernade Meade and Sanchez Watt), along with seven other players (Bihmoutine, Reice Charles-Cook, Sead Hajrović, Neita, Philip Roberts, Rees and James Shea) who were then free to play for other teams. Manager Arsène Wenger had also revealed Arsenal were not going to renew the contracts of players Andrey Arshavin (who later rejoined his former club Zenit Saint Petersburg) and Sébastien Squillaci, whilst Denílson's agent also confirmed his contract was cancelled by mutual consent (and later signed on a permanent contract by São Paulo), as all three players were free to play for other clubs.

The transfer window opened on 1 July which prompted Arsenal to announce the signing of French Under 20 striker Yaya Sanogo on a free transfer following his contract completion at old club Auxerre. He became the first signing of the season and joined on a "long-term contract". Sanogo was given the number 22 shirt while Abou Diaby switched from the number 2 to the number 24. Arsenal also confirmed that Johan Djourou had joined Hamburg on a one-year loan deal with a view to a permanent deal in the following summer. whilst it was also announced Francis Coquelin has agreed to join Freiburg also for an entire season. Arsenal announced the departure of goalkeeper Vito Mannone to Sunderland for an undisclosed fee, thought to be around £2million, on a two-year contract. Mannone was used as a regular in the absence of Wojciech Szczęsny and Łukasz Fabiański last season. The Gunners also renewed the contracts of four players, three of whom were academy players (Fagan, Anthony Jeffrey and Ansah and the other being the right back reserve-team player Héctor Bellerín. The departures of three players were announced soon afterwards, as Jernade Meade joined fellow Premier League side Swansea City, Sébastien Squillaci completed his transfer to Bastia and left-back André Santos completed his free transfer move to Flamengo on a two-year contract. After the Asia tour had been completed, Arsenal also announced the loan departure of Joel Campbell to Greek side Olympiacos for a third successive loan spell to gain first-team experience. Arsenal continued their summer exodus after announcing the departure of Gervinho to Roma in a deal thought be to around £8 million and the loan departure of Ignasi Miquel to Championship side Leicester City for the remainder of the season.

=== August ===
Arsenal kicked off their season in search of their first trophy in 8 years, though the signs were not encouraging as Arsenal began their league campaign with a disappointing 3–1 loss at home to Aston Villa. An early Giroud goal was expected to give the Gunners momentum but a penalty-rebound and a penalty (awarded in controversial circumstances) scored by Benteke and a late counter-attacking goal against the 10 men of Arsenal (following Koscielny's double yellow card) sealed the victory for the visitors. The disappointment was compounded due to Villa's league standing in the previous season (15th) and the lack of signings despite the fans being promised of a summer of increased spending, which ultimately led to manager Arsène Wenger apologising for the display at the Emirates. However, Arsenal fought back confidently with a 3–0 away win at Fenerbahçe as goals from Kieran Gibbs, the much-improved Aaron Ramsey and Olivier Giroud almost secured the Gunners' place in the group stages of the Champions League. Arsenal then travelled to Fulham and picked up a 3–1 victory, thanks to Giroud's third goal in three games and a goal either side of half time from Lukas Podolski. Arsenal continued their impressive run in the second leg of their play-off against Fenerbahçe with a solid 2–0 win to complete a 5–0 aggregate result with two Ramsey goals.

Four games into the season Arsenal announced the re-signing of French midfielder Mathieu Flamini on a free transfer following his release from Italian giants A.C. Milan. Flamini joined the Gunners 5 years after his first spell with Wenger complimenting Flamini's focus when on the football pitch. Arsene Wenger then reiterated his desire to bring in more players ahead of a crucial North London derby.

=== September ===
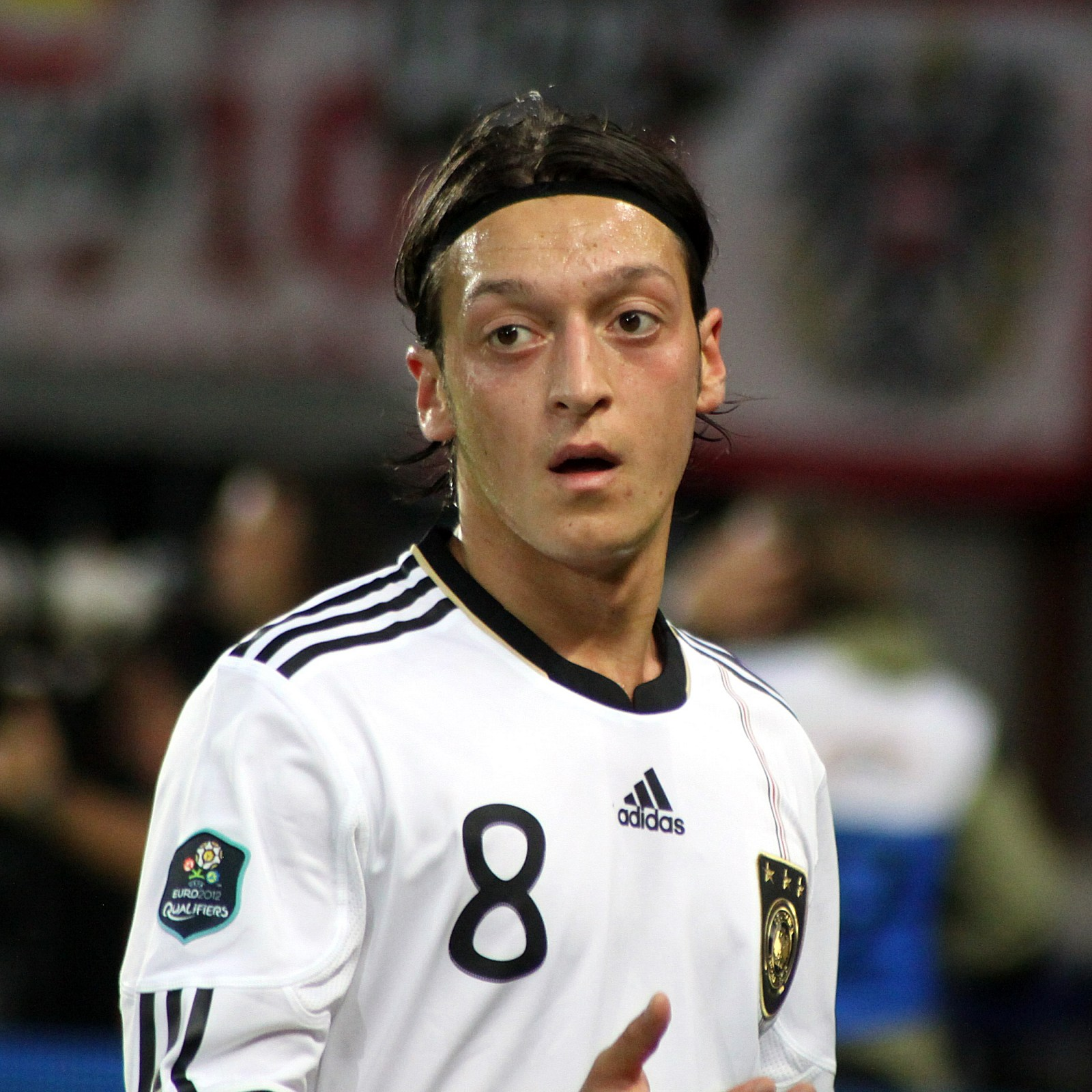
Özil joined from Real Madrid on the deadline day of the transfer period for a reported fee of £42.5 million.

The first North London Derby of the season on 1 September was won by the Gunners through a single Giroud goal in the 23rd minute as they managed to end Tottenham's unbeaten streak and take the Gunners up to fourth in the table. The goal brought Giroud's tally to 4 goals for the season with four consecutive wins in all competitions. In an unusually late 'Transfer Deadline Day', Arsène Wenger's promises in the aftermath of Flamini's signing were seemingly coming true, with two players being linked with Arsenal, one of which was the highly regarded Mesut Özil for a reported £42.4 million. Upon the completion of the deal, Arsenal broke their transfer record fee by £27 million. Another signing was confirmed hours beforehand, as Arsenal completed the loan signing of Emiliano Viviano from Serie B side Palermo for a season-long loan. He has been signed as a back-up keeper to current no.1 Szczęsny. However Özil remained at the fore front of Arsenal activity, as the transfer fee was the second highest in British history and one of the largest fees paid in world football, signalling the intent of the Arsenal Board to propel the club to supposed 'title contenders'. Özil made an impressive début against Sunderland after making numerous opportunities for Walcott and a decisive assist for Giroud that sent the Gunners top of the table temporarily. Arsenal then faced a tricky away tie against Marseille but a solid performance and continued prosperity for Aaron Ramsey put Arsenal top of their Champions League group after Matchday 1. Ramsey's 7th goal in 8 games along with goals from defenders Sagna and Mertesacker sent Arsenal top of the table for the second game in succession (albeit temporarily after the previous game). Özil provided all three assists on his home début as Arsenal ran out 3–1 winners. Arsenal's fortunes away from home continued as they went through to the fourth round of the League Cup on penalties against a stubborn West Bromwich Albion. Thomas Eisfeld scored the only goal in regulation time and Nacho Monreal hit the winning penalty to send Arsenal to a fourth round tie against Chelsea at the Emirates. Arsenal then won where their Premier League away run began with a 2–1 over Swansea City at Liberty Stadium. German youngster Serge Gnabry (Arsenal's second youngest Premier League scorer behind Fàbregas) and Aaron Ramsey scored the goals as all four sides in the top four last season (excluding Arsenal) dropped points. This left Arsenal leading the table by 2 points by the end of September, over Liverpool and North London rivals Tottenham.

=== October ===
Arsenal then overcame a potentially difficult tie against Serie A side Napoli in style with a maiden goal for Özil and a goal from Frenchman Giroud all in the first 15 minutes sealed an impressive 2–0 victory. The win ensured Arsenal a tenth successive win in all competitions. However their winning and away-winning run came to an abrupt end after a 1–1 draw against West Brom. Wilshere's goal in the second half cancelled out Yacob's opener as Arsenal stayed top of the Premier League for the third successive week. Following Liverpool's early kick-off draw at Newcastle, Arsenal needed a win against Norwich City to regain top spot. With goals from Wilshere (first consecutive goals in his career), Özil (2) and the in form Aaron Ramsey, Arsenal won 4–1 and convincingly returned to the Premier League summit. Next Arsenal would host Borussia Dortmund in the Champion's League. A spirited performance ultimately ended in defeat after goals from Mkhitaryan and Lewandowski (who was controversially awarded a yellow card for an offence that has been awarded red cards in the past) cancelled out Giroud's goal leaving the top three teams in the Champions League table on 6 points each. Arsenal returned to Premier League action against a recently manager-less Crystal Palace and a solid 2–0 win (despite going to down to ten men following Arteta's sending off) sent Arsenal temporarily 5 points clear at the top of the table. Ultimately, October ended similarly to September as Arsenal finished 2 points clear at the top of the table at the end of the month. Arsenal now face another tough test against Chelsea in the League Cup as the Gunners look to continue to fight in all four competitions they compete in. Arsenal lost to Chelsea 2–0 at the Emirates Stadium, thus getting eliminated from the League Cup.

=== November ===
Despite consecutive home disappointments, Arsenal extended their lead at the top of the table to 5 points after a convincing 2–0 win over Liverpool at the Emirates. Goals from Cazorla and Ramsey secured a win for first place over second place in a top of the table clash. This subsequently gave the confidence for Arsenal to get a historic win with an Aaron Ramsey headed goal (his 11th of the season) giving the Gunners a 1–0 in Dortmund. Arsenal remained top of the Champions League table with 9 points with triple player of the month Ramsey continuing to score. The Gunners then suffered a set-back before the international break as they continued their poor form at Old Trafford to lose 1–0 to Manchester United. Former Gunner Robin van Persie scored with a header against an Arsenal side depleted with illness which narrowed the Gunners' advantage to 2 points at the top of the table. This increased to four in an unlikely top-of-the-table clash against Southampton as a Giroud double either side of the half allowed the Gunners to capitalise on second-placed Liverpool dropping points in their Merseyside derby (3–3). Giroud's 10th of season negotiated a tough period in the Premier League successfully, on the eve of taking on Marseille in the Champions League. In this crucial tie, Arsenal all but secured qualification into the next round (assuming they do not lose 3–0 or more in Naples) with Jack Wilshere's first career double, one after 28 seconds and another in the second half to give Arsenal a 2–0 win. The convincing manner of Arsenal's victory, albeit missing a few opportunities (including a missed penalty from Özil), kept Arsenal top of their group for all 5 matchdays. Arsenal then increased their lead to the top of the table to 7 points temporarily (later reduced back to 4) with a convincing 3–0 win against Cardiff City away. On his return to his former club, Aaron Ramsey scored his 7th and 8th Premier League goals, separated by an unlikely strike from Flamini, which strengthened the Gunners' title credentials.

=== December ===
The Gunners continued to stay top of the table (for the 11th consecutive matchday) after a 2–0 victory over Hull City at home. An early header from Nicklas Bendtner (his first since March 2011) and a strike from Mesut Özil ensured the victory ahead of a tough December fixture list for the Gunners. Arsenal then secured a draw against Everton as a late Özil goal was cancelled out by a goal from Gerard Deulofeu, the Barcelona youth on-loan with the Blues. As a result of the results around the Premier League, Arsenal increased their lead to five points at the top of the table ahead of the match against Manchester City. In the last match in the Champions League group stage, Arsenal played away at Napoli. Winning or a draw would assure them of topping their group, but Arsenal lost the game 0–2. They still qualified on head-to-head results, as second placed team (with the top three teams all on 12 points), behind Borussia Dortmund to progress to the knockout stage. Back in the Premier League, Arsenal travelled to the Etihad Stadium to face Manchester City, who had just two goals scored against them at home and no losses. Despite two goals from Theo Walcott (on his first start since September) and a late Mertesacker header, Arsenal lost 6–3, but remained two points ahead of rivals Liverpool. During the match, Laurent Koscielny suffered a laceration to his leg and there were doubts that he would play for at least a month, though this proved not to be the case, and Jack Wilshere was given a two match ban for an abusive hand gesture made during the match. The Gunners then faced another title-chaser in Chelsea nine days later, after being drawn against last years champions Bayern Munich in the round of 16 of the UEFA Champions League. Arsenal drew 0–0 against Chelsea which led to them falling off the top of the league for the first time since 14 September. This meant they entered Christmas second at the table behind Liverpool, who lead as a result of their higher goal difference. Arsenal faced West Ham United away on Boxing Day and following a run of no victories in three matches, Arsenal bounced back with a 3–1 victory, after two goals from Theo Walcott and a single goal from Lukas Podolski. The victory meant Arsenal jumped back on to the top of the table ahead of a trip to St James' Park to play Newcastle. Arsenal finished 2013 with two victories and as league leaders as they ran out 1–0 winners after a scrappy Giroud goal, reflecting the scrappy nature of the match.

=== January ===
Arsenal started 2014 with a 2–0 victory against Cardiff at the Emirates Stadium after two late goals from Nicklas Bendtner (88') and Theo Walcott (90+2'). Bendtner injured himself shortly after scoring, leaving the team with a shortage of strikers and a lengthy injury list, with several key players, such as Olivier Giroud, Mesut Özil, Aaron Ramsey and Kieran Gibbs missing the match. In the next match, Arsenal faced rivals Tottenham Hotspur in the third round of the FA Cup. Goals from Santi Cazorla and Tomáš Rosický either side of the half saw Arsenal comfortably win 2–0 at the Emirates Stadium, progressing to the fourth round, where they faced Coventry City. On the injury front, Arsenal lost Theo Walcott for the remainder of the season, after he ruptured the anterior cruciate ligament of his left knee. Back in the Premier League, Arsenal faced Aston Villa, who beat them 3–1 in the first game of the season, looking to maintain their one-point lead from 2013. Goals from Jack Wilshere and then Olivier Giroud inside 59 seconds meant Arsenal were ahead at half-time. Despite a 76th-minute goal from Christian Benteke of Aston Villa, Arsenal held on to their lead to win the game 2–1. The Gunners then extended their winning streak to 5 games in the Premier League as a brace from Cazorla (57th and 62nd minute) ensured Arsenal secured a 2–0 victory over London rivals Fulham before a 10-day hiatus from the competition. Within this period, Arsenal faced Coventry City and comfortably booked their fifth round FA Cup place with a 4–0 rout of the League One side. Goals from Lukas Podolski (two before the interval) and late strikes from substitute Giroud and Cazorla ensured the Gunners secured their 7th win in 7 games in all competitions and a match against Premier League rivals Liverpool in the next round.

==== Transfers ====
In a rather quiet window for Arsène Wenger's team, Arsenal signed a solitary midfielder in Kim Källström in a deadline day loan move that will see him remain at the club until the end of the season. Following injuries and suspensions to a number of key Arsenal midfielders, Källström was brought in as experienced cover (at the age of 31) and is eligible for all competitions the Gunners are competing in. The following day, it emerged that Källström had suffered a back injury and would be out for at least the next six matches.

In news concerning the youth players at Arsenal, the club announced the permanent departures of Anthony Jeffrey, Nico Yennaris and Emmanuel Frimpong to Wycombe Wanderers, Brentford and Barnsley respectively, the latter two of whom had made appearances in the first team. It was also announced that youngsters Chuba Akpom and Daniel Boateng had joined Brentford and Hibernian respectively to gain further first team experiences away from the club. Following the 11pm deadline, the loan departure of Park Chu-young was announced by club, with the first-team South Korean striker joining Championship side Watford to gain more playing time away from the club.

=== February ===
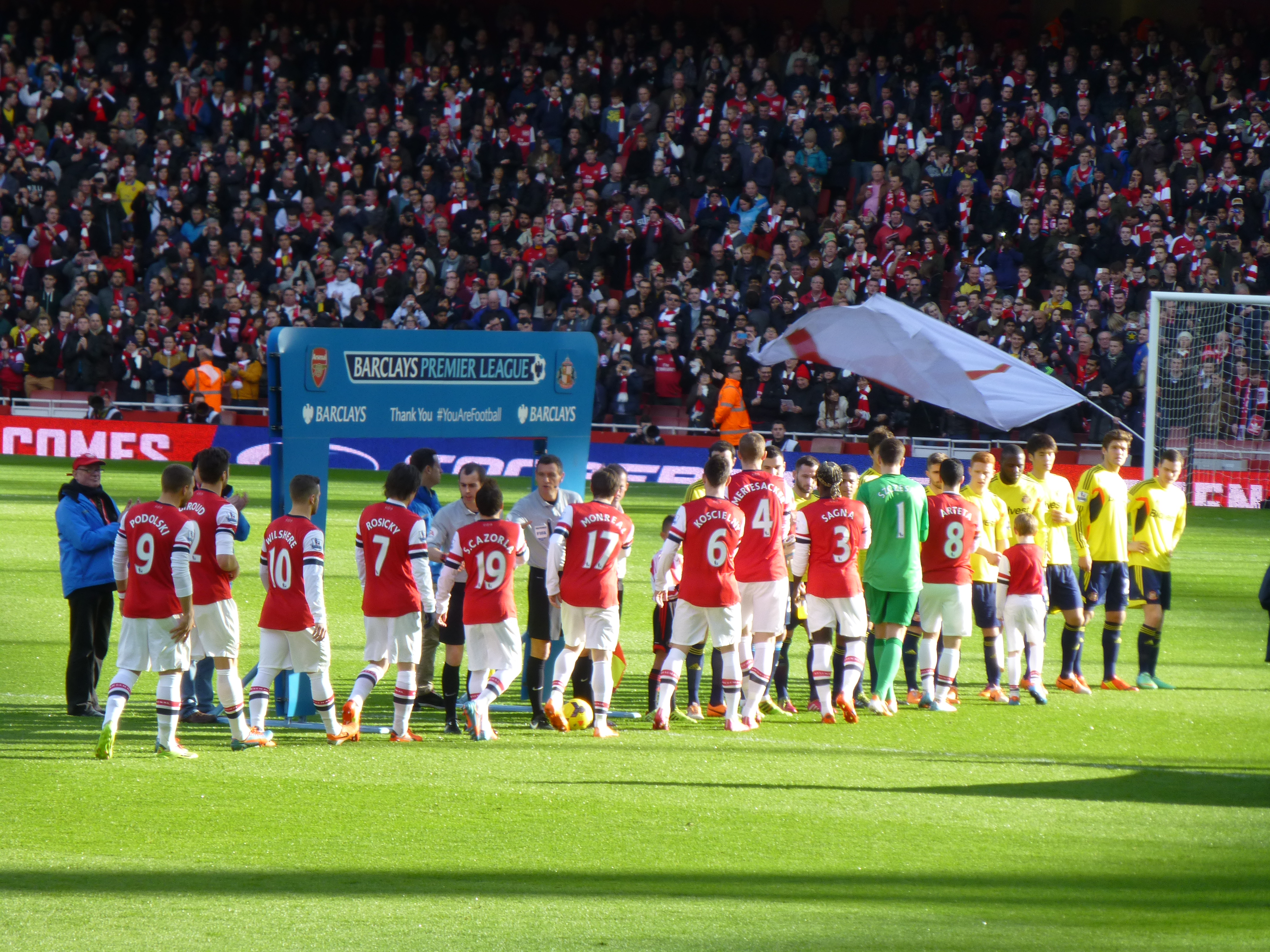
Arsenal players shaking hands with their Sunderland counterparts before their Premier League match on 22 February 2014.

Arsenal's February started on a sour note after it was revealed their new signing Källström would be out for around the next 6 games of the season despite only signing the day before. However, on the pitch, the month started brightly as a host of their rivals dropped points followed by a convincing 2–0 home win at Crystal Palace ensuring the Gunners remained unbeaten in the last 7 Premier League games going into a tough period of fixtures (described as season-defining by Per Mertesacker). The goals came from a brace from Alex Oxlade-Chamberlain on his first start since the opening day of the season as Arsenal regained their two-point lead from two matches ago. The next match was Liverpool away, which resulted in a humiliating 5–1 defeat at Anfield, with a Mikel Arteta goal from the penalty spot giving the Gunners any consolation from the match. Arsenal then hosted reigning champions Manchester United at the Emirates on the 12th, drawing disappointingly 0–0, with the threat of falling down to third in the Premier League table as Manchester City remain two points behind the Gunners, along with having a game in hand. Shortly afterwards, Wenger claimed that other managers "fear to fail" due to the fact they play down their club's title chances. Mourinho, who himself had played down any chance that Chelsea will win the league, stated that Wenger was a "specialist in failure", as the Arsenal manager had not lifted a trophy since 2005. Wenger later remarked saying that the comments made by Mourinho were 'silly and disrespectful', along with saying that Mourinho had 'embarrassed Chelsea'. Away from the Premier League and off-pitch antics, Arsenal gained their revenge over Liverpool with a 2–1 win in the FA Cup. This win ensured the Gunners progressed into the quarter-final, and are scheduled to face another Merseyside club in Everton in that tie on 8 March. Goals from Lukas Podolski and Alex Oxlade-Chamberlain ensured the result, despite Steven Gerrard pulling one back from the penalty spot. The tough run of fixtures now continue for the Gunners with reigning European champions Bayern Munich visiting the Emirates for their last 16 clash in the Champions League. Arsenal had started the game against Munich strong, and were awarded a penalty in the 7th minute with Jérôme Boateng fouling Mesut Özil in the penalty area. Özil failed to convert, as Manuel Neuer saved a left-footed shot in the centre of the goal. Things took a turn for the worse as keeper Wojciech Szczęsny fouled Arjen Robben in the 36th minute, giving away a penalty to the Bavarian side. The foul earned Szczęsny a red card, but Bayern were unable to take the advantage as David Alaba hit the left post. Toni Kroos was able to break the deadlock in the 53rd minute, netting in the top right corner. Towards the latter stages of the game, Thomas Müller was able to put a second past Arsenal, slotting in the bottom right corner. The game had ended 0–2 to Bayern, with Arsenal now requiring 3 goals at the Allianz Arena in order to progress into the quarter-finals.

Arsenal had unveiled a statue of former striker Dennis Bergkamp, who had scored 120 goals in 423 appearances, along with being an integral member of the Invincibles team that went an entire league campaign unbeaten. The statue depicts Bergkamp in action for Arsenal against Newcastle in February 2003. The statue will join those of other Arsenal legends in manager Herbert Chapman, striker Thierry Henry and defender Tony Adams, along with the statues being located outside the Emirates Stadium above the Armoury Store.

Arsenal then returned to league fixtures, starting with Sunderland at home, a game Arsenal won 4–1. Olivier Giroud struck early to give the home side the lead, and then slotting again in less than thirty minutes, with Arsenal leading 2–0 at the half-hour mark. Czech playmaker Tomáš Rosický scored three minutes to half time, with a beautiful team goal. The Gunners sealed the game at half time, but were able to score a fourth with defender Laurent Koscielny with a header, following an assist from Santi Cazorla following a corner. Emanuele Giaccherini scored a mere consolation goal for The Black Cats, with a shot into the bottom left corner. There was a scare as Koscielny (who has formed a strong partnership with fellow defender Per Mertesacker) was replaced by Mathieu Flamini due to injury, but manager Wenger said that he would be able to return fit in time for the next league encounter, which is with 14th placed Stoke. Arsenal now sit in 2nd place, behind rivals Chelsea by one point.

=== March ===
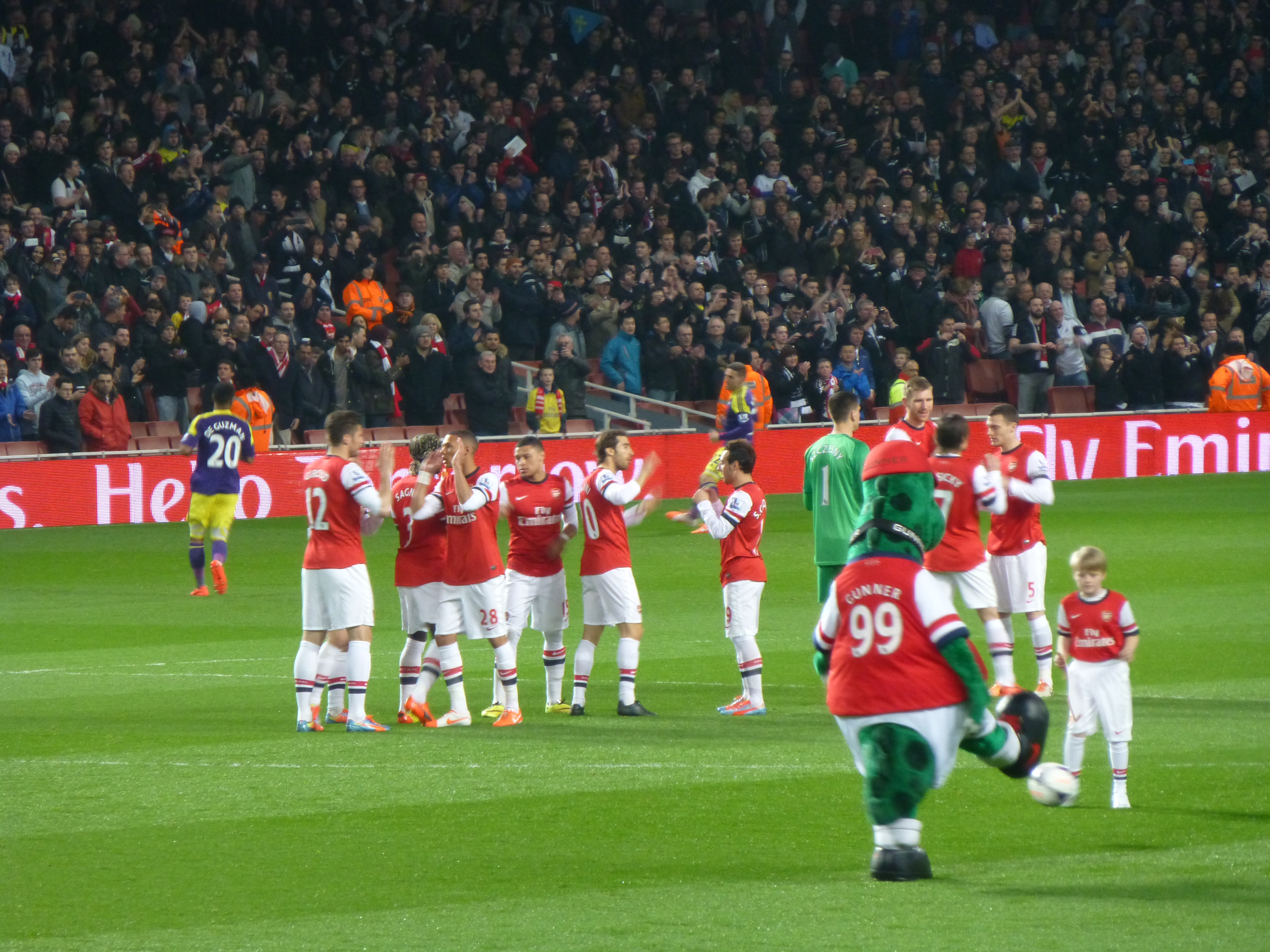
Arsenal players before their match against Swansea City on 25 March. Prior to that game, Arsenal had a record of 6 wins, 5 losses and 1 draw against the Welsh club.

Arsenal played Stoke which started at a 3pm kick off to begin the new month. Arsenal travelled away for this fixture, and were left disappointed as they lost 1–0. Stoke were awarded a controversial penalty in the 76th minute for a supposed handball from Laurent Koscielny. The penalty was converted by Jonathan Walters, who tucked the ball into the bottom right corner. In his post match press conference, Wenger described Arsenal's finishing as "too selfish" and defeat meant Arsenal boss had won only one of their last four Premier League games. Arsenal dropped to third, as fellow title contenders Liverpool and Chelsea won their games. Chelsea hwld a four-point gap at the summit of the Premier League, whilst Liverpool moved above Arsenal on goal difference.

Arsenal's second fixture of March was against Everton in the FA Cup at the Emirates. The last time the teams had met, a draw was played, and both teams had also strengthened their squads in the January transfer window. Record signing Özil struck early on, to give the host's the lead. On loan Everton striker Romelu Lukaku tapped in from near the goalline in the 32nd minute to bring the scores back at level pegging. Arsenal were awarded a penalty in the 68th minute following Gareth Barry's challenge on Alex Oxlade-Chamberlain, and the penalty was converted by Mikel Arteta to make Arsenal lead 2–1. Olivier Giroud replaced Yaya Sanogo, along with Tomáš Rosický replacing Oxlade-Chamberlain. The substitutes proved to be crucial, as Giroud netted twice in the last ten minutes and Rosický's sublime passing lead to counterattacks to stretch Arsenal's lead, with the game finishing 4–1. Arsenal progressed through to the semi-finals of the FA Cup where they were pitted against holders Wigan, and sought an 11th triumph in football's oldest competition, which would end a trophy drought stretching back to 2005.

Arsenal's third fixture of March consisted of a Champions League last 16 second leg clash against holders Bayern Munich at the Allianz Arena. Arsenal were already 2–0 down from the previous clash between the sides earlier in the year, and in order to progress in the competition they required 3 goals to advance into the quarter-finals. The deadlock was broken by Bastian Schweinsteiger who slotted past keeper Łukasz Fabiański (who replaced Wojciech Szczęsny for this match due to Szczęsny's suspension) to put Bayern up 1–0 (3–0 on aggregate). Bayern did not keep the lead for long as former Bayern striker Lukas Podolski slotted over Manuel Neuer to level the scores 1–1. Arsenal needed two more goals but were not able to pursue their lead and the game finished 1–1 (3–1 on aggregate) and Arsenal were knocked out of the competition. Record signing Mesut Özil was substituted at half time, and is facing "at least a few weeks out" after suffering a hamstring injury. Arsenal now travel to White Hart Lane to face fifth placed Tottenham Hotspur in the North London Derby.

On 16 March, Arsenal returned to league action and travelled to White Hart Lane to face Tottenham Hotspur in the North London Derby. Arsenal had won the fixture back in 1–0 September, thanks to a strike from Olivier Giroud. Both teams were looking for a win: Arsenal to stay in the title race whilst Spurs needed the win in order close the gap and qualify for the Champions League. Arsenal set the pace early, and all the effort was rewarded as Tomáš Rosický was able to open the scoring after 72 seconds, after being at the heart of a swift break for the visitors. Laurent Koscielny was able to save a Nacer Chadli shot off the line and Arsenal defended well to get the victory at White Hart Lane, a first for Arsenal since November 2007. After the match Arsenal sat behind Chelsea and Liverpool by four points and goal difference respectively, before facing Chelsea at Stamford Bridge on 22 March.

Elsewhere, key Arsenal midfield duo Santi Cazorla and Aaron Ramsey penned new deals with the club, along with teen sensation Gedion Zelalem who also signed a new deal since joining the club in January 2013.

Arsenal went on to face Chelsea at Stamford Bridge on 22 March 2014, a match that saw manager Arsène Wenger reach 1000 games. The match ended with a 6–0 loss as Samuel Eto'o and André Schürrle opened the scoring twice in the first seven minutes. A handball from Oxlade-Chamberlain resulted in a Chelsea penalty, which was converted by Eden Hazard to make it 3–0 inside the first twenty minutes. Although Oxlade-Chamberlain committed the offence to award the penalty, defender Gibbs was shown the red card much to the confusion of his Arsenal teammates. Oxlade-Chamberlain even said admitted to the offence, but Gibbs was sent off anyway. This was the second time Arsenal conceded three goals in the first twenty minutes of a game during the course of the season. Oscar was able to add a fourth before half time and he added another goal in the 66th minute before new Chelsea signing Mohamed Salah scored his first Chelsea goal to end the match 6–0. Arsenal are now sitting in fourth place, seven points behind leaders Chelsea, and face Swansea on 25 March 2014, looking for a win to keep their title hopes alive.

Arsenal played host to Swansea at the Emirates on 26 March 2014. Arsenal started the match conceding a goal after a Wilfried Bony header. After the first half, Wenger replaced Oxlade-Chamberlain with Lukas Podolski, and Podolski found the back of the net in the 73rd minute, levelling the scores. Olivier Giroud was able to score Arsenals second goal of the night in under 70 seconds after the levelling goal from Podolski, giving Arsenal the lead. It looked like Arsenal were going to secure a win three points when Swansea player Leon Britton surged into the box and shot. The shot was saved by Szczęsny, only for it to ricochet in off Flamini and into the net, ending the game 2–2, giving Wenger's side one point.

Arsenal hosted Manchester City on 29 March with the late kick off. After league leaders Chelsea lost to Crystal Palace earlier the same day, a win for Arsenal would help them gain points on the teams ahead in the table. However, City playmaker David Silva opened the scoring for the Manchester side after he tapped the ball into an empty net after Edin Džeko's shot had hit the post. The Gunners levelled as Mathieu Flamini turned in Lukas Podolski's pass to level the scores at 1–1. No side could get a winner, and the game ended 1–1. The point meant Arsenal still have a slim chance to win the Premier League, sitting in fourth place, five points behind second placed Chelsea, four points adrift of Liverpool (who can top the league if they beat North London rivals Tottenham Hotspur on 30 March) and three points behind Manchester City, who have played two fewer matches than their title rivals. Arsenal can go back in the running for the Premier League should they beat fifth placed Everton at Goodison Park on 6 April.

=== April ===
Arsenal began April travelling away at Goodison Park to face Everton. A win would allow Arsenal to close the gap on Everton, who were also challenging for the last Champions League spot, along with gaining points and keeping the pressure on fellow title rivals in Manchester City, Liverpool and Chelsea. Arsenal began the game poorly, and conceded to Steven Naismith in just under 15 minutes. Romelu Lukaku scored his 14th goal of the season when he slotted past after a fine sweeping move made by Everton, before Kevin Mirallas forced Mikel Arteta into his own net, effectively ending the game for Arsenal at 3–0. The defeat means Arsenal have not won a league game since 16 March, along with not winning a single game against the current top-five, along with challenging for the league title a serious doubt. However, on a more positive note, Nacho Monreal and midfielder Aaron Ramsey had both returned from injuries (injuries to the foot and thigh respectively), with the latter featuring in his first match since the 3–1 win at West Ham in December. Arsenal now face Wigan in the FA Cup semi-final at Wembley on 12 April.

Arsenal travelled to Wembley to face Wigan in the FA Cup semi final, a match dubbed as Arsène Wenger's biggest game of the season. Arsenal fielded a side similar to the one that faced Everton, with the exception of Sanogo, Oxlade-Chamberlain, Ramsey and Fabiański who replaced Giroud, Rosický, Flamini and Szczęsny respectively. The first half consisted of no action and Arsenal looked lacklustre through the first half. However, the second half looked more upbeat and Arsenal were creating chances, but midfielder Jordi Gómez opened the scoring from the penalty spot for Wigan after Mertesacker brought down Callum McManaman. The German centre back brought Arsenal back into the game, scoring a header from an Oxlade-Chamberlain cross. Scores were level at 1–1, as Arsenal nor Wigan were able to score during regular time, as extra time preceded. With neither team able to break down the other throughout added time, the winner would have to be decided via penalty kicks. Mikel Arteta opened the scoring for Arsenal, but a Jack Collison penalty for Wigan was saved. On loan midfielder Källström netted in another for Arsenal, before Jean Beausejour was able to net in for the Championship side. Giroud was able to score another, giving Arsenal a healthy 3–1 advantage, before James McArthur scored another for Wigan. With Arsenal having the lead, a successful penalty from Santi Cazorla would propel Arsenal through to the FA Cup final. Cazorla was able to find the net, having slotted into the bottom left corner. Arsenal will now face the winner of the second FA Cup semi final between Sheffield United and Hull City, (a match which Hull won), and Arsenal will now face Hull in the FA Cup final on 17 May, hoping to end a trophy drought stretching back to 2005.

Arsenal now focused on league action, and hosted West Ham at the Emirates. Coming into the game, Arsenal had not won a league fixture since the 6-0 thrashing at Chelsea on 22 March. The team that was selected saw Szczęsny, Vermaelen, loanee midfielder Källström (making his first start for the Gunners) and Giroud return to the starting line-up. Arsenal started the game quite slow, and Giroud missed a clear chance inside 30 minutes, where Arsenal began to pick up the face. However, they were down after 40 minutes, with Matt Jarvis heading home for West Ham. Then, Cazorla picked up the ball following a poor clearance from Stewart Downing, and his pass was expertly finished by Podolski, who levelled the scores with a shot on the turn two minutes later for the impressive FA Cup finalists. Arsenal headed into half time at 1–1, and began the second half with the same pace shown late in the first half. Vermaelen had delivered a long ball back into the box following a corner and with a touch of class from Olivier Giroud, he netted his 20th goal of the season. However, instead of sitting on the lead, Arsenal drove forward for more, and Podolski's fierce drive sealed the win as Arsenal moved up to fourth, and the Gunners will now travel away to Hull City (who are also Arsenal's FA Cup final opponents) for league action on 20 April.

Arsenal travelled away to Hull, searching for three points to keep their Top Four hopes alive. The Gunners welcomed back Aaron Ramsey and Mesut Özil back into the side after lengthy spells on the sidelines due to injury. The match was played in blustery conditions which caused an early hold-up in play as advertising hoardings were blown across the pitch, and against opponents committed to pressing high and hard, this match had the potential to be a tough one for the Gunners. But the match went underway and Arsenal almost went down after Shane Long's shot went high. However, Arsenal took control as Santi Cazorla set up Aaron Ramsey to fire in and Podolski buried a half-volley. Podolski turned in a loose ball after the break and Hull never threatened to peg back their FA Cup final opponents. Arsenal managed to contain Hull throughout the game, and Aaron Ramsey displayed the attacking intelligence missed by the Gunners during his injury, as he had the most touches (104), most shots (four), and the joint-highest number of shots on target (three) of any Arsenal player in the match. Arsenal still remain a point above Everton, (who are also chasing Champions League qualification), after the Merseyside club beat Man Utd at Goodison Park. Arsenal will now host Newcastle at the Emirates on 28 April.

Arsenal hosted Newcastle at the Emirates for their final game of April, knowing a win would put them on the brink of securing Champions League football for a 17th consecutive season. After beginning the match with a low-key start, the Gunners went ahead when Laurent Koscielny prodded home Santi Cazorla's free-kick. Cazorla's ball from deep was floated into a dangerous area over the Magpies' backline and Koscielny shrugged off Moussa Sissoko to meet it on the bounce and poke past Tim Krul. The second goal arrived three minutes before the break when Giroud sprung the Newcastle offside trap to race on to a Mikel Arteta pass. Twice his shots were blocked by Krul, but the loose ball rolled across goal to present Özil — who may have been marginally offside — with a simple finish. Newcastle could have pulled one back, however, as Loïc Rémy, making his first start since 1 March, controlled the ball and flicked it through to Yoan Gouffran, who outpaced Nacho Monreal but could not find a way past Wojciech Szczęsny from a tight angle. Arsenal were not on the back foot for long, and soon the victory was secure after Ramsey played Özil into space on the left and his cross was expertly headed home by Giroud at the near post. Lukas Podolski went close again when his side-footed shot fizzed past the upright before, at the other end, Paul Dummett's effort flew horribly wide to sum up a miserable night for the Magpies. With the win, Arsenal had a four-point gap over Everton in the race for 4th place with two games remaining.

=== May ===
On 3 May, Manchester City won against Everton, meaning Arsenal stayed four points ahead of Everton. With Everton having only one match left to play, Arsenal secured a top four spot in the League, meaning that Arsenal ensured that they will qualify for the 2014–15 UEFA Champions League play-off round next season. The Gunners could mathematically still reach third place in Premier League, which would mean qualification into the group stages of the competition.

Arsenal's penultimate game of the season was hosting Premier League strugglers West Brom on 4 May. Arsenal won 1–0, however, despite the scoreline, The Gunners had rarely been threatened by the Baggies, and after 14 minutes, Olivier Giroud netted his 22nd goal of the season. The France striker grabbed the only goal of the game, rising in front of marker Craig Dawson to convert Santi Cazorla's corner. The France international has brilliant knack of losing his marker when the ball is played from the wings, and on this occasion, he beat Dawson to score his 15th Premier League goal. However, Giroud's early opening goal provided one of the few rousing moments during a sedate match. Ben Foster was given little chance with that effort and perhaps should not have been given any with a Cazorla shot moments later. But the England World Cup hopeful was on his toes to push away the Spaniard's effort as it headed for the bottom corner. Arsenal went close once more, after the break, when Lukas Podolski mis-hit a half-volley from 10 yards that bounced off the post and into the arms of Foster. West Brom's best effort in the game came from Graham Dorrans, but his 25-yard shot was patted down by Wojciech Szczęsny. The win sits Arsenal in 4th, on 76 points, behind rivals Chelsea (who sit in 3rd) by 3 points after Chelsea played out a goalless draw against Norwich later in the day. The Gunners finish their league campaign at Norwich on 11 May before an FA Cup final against Hull on 17 May, as they aim to end a run of nine years without a trophy.

Arsenal, for their final Premier League fixture of the season, travelled away to Norwich, who looked doomed to relegation from the Premier League. The only way the Canaries would have stayed up was if West Brom lost to Stoke and if Norwich won 17–0. Jack Wilshere returned after a foot injury for the final 30 minutes, while knee injury victim Abou Diaby also came on for the Gunners in his first game in 14 months. But it was Ramsey, also returning from injury, who shone for the visitors, rifling in a superb volley from Giroud's delicate chip to the back post. It was the Welshman's 17th goal of an injury-disrupted season, and Arsenal went into the game with a Champions League spot already secured and with the prospect of a first trophy for nine years still to come in next week's FA Cup final, and a strong Gunners side rarely had to rise above second gear at Carrow Road. After Ramsey's opener, Jenkinson grabbed his first Arsenal goal, pouncing on Podolski's deflected shot from a Kieran Gibbs cross. Norwich never wilted, and debutant Jamar Loza stung Fabiański's fingers while the Polish keeper had to be quick off his line to close down Robert Snodgrass. The win confirmed Norwich's relegation, and only strengthened Arsenal's momentum heading into the FA Cup final.

Arsenal's final game of the 2013-14 campaign in all competitions took place at Wembley Stadium against Hull City in the 2014 FA Cup Final. The Gunners started as favourites but were stunned as goals from James Chester and Curtis Davies gave Hull a flying start inside the first eight minutes. Arsenal needed to find a way back into the match and it came after 17 minutes when Cazorla curled a free-kick beyond the Hull City keeper Allan McGregor, making it 1–2 into half-time. In the second half Arsenal put pressure on Hull City and the equaliser came with 19 minutes left. It was Laurent Koscielny who scored from a corner after a header from Bacary Sagna and a deflection from Olivier Giroud. Arsenal kept the pressure, but no team could find a winning goal and the match went into extra time. After 108 minutes Aaron Ramsey scored what would be the match winning goal with a first-time finish inside the area after a backheel pass from Olivier Giroud. Arsenal, and goalkeeper for the day Lukas Fabianski, managed to stop Hull City form scoring an equaliser and won a trophy for the first time in nine years.

== Players ==
=== Squad information ===
N	Pos.	Nat.	Name	Age	EU	Since	App	Goals	Ends	Transfer fee	Notes
1	GK	(Poland)	Wojciech Szczęsny	24	EU	2006	152	0	undisclosed	Youth system	
3	DF	(France)	Bacary Sagna	31	EU	2007	284	5	2014	€9M plus possible 2M in bonuses	
4	DF	(Germany)	Per Mertesacker	29	EU	2011	123	6	undisclosed	£8.0M	
5	DF	(Belgium)	Thomas Vermaelen (captain)	28	EU	2009	150	15	2015	£10.0M	
6	DF	(France)	Laurent Koscielny	28	EU	2010	165	13	undisclosed	£8.5M	
7	MF	(Czech Republic)	Tomáš Rosický	33	EU	2006	221	25	undisclosed	£6.8M	
8	MF	(Spain)	Mikel Arteta (vice-captain)	32	EU	2011	124	15	2015	£10.0M	
9	FW	(Germany)	Lukas Podolski	28	EU	2012	69	28	2016	£10.9M	
10	MF	(England)	Jack Wilshere	22	EU	2008	132	10	2018	Youth system	
11	MF	(Germany)	Mesut Özil	25	EU	2013	40	7	undisclosed	£42.5M	
12	FW	(France)	Olivier Giroud	27	EU	2012	98	39	undisclosed	£12.8M	
13	GK	(Italy)	Emiliano Viviano	28	EU	2013	0	0	2014	Free	On loan from Palermo
14	FW	(England)	Theo Walcott	25	EU	2006 (Winter)	281	69	undisclosed	£9.1M	
15	FW	(England)	Alex Oxlade-Chamberlain	20	EU	2011	79	9	undisclosed	£12.0M	
16	MF	(Wales)	Aaron Ramsey	23	EU	2008	184	27	undisclosed	£4.8M	
17	DF	(Spain)	Nacho Monreal	28	EU	2013 (Winter)	47	1	undisclosed	£8.5M	
19	MF	(Spain)	Santi Cazorla	29	EU	2012	95	19	undisclosed	£12.0M	
20	MF	(France)	Mathieu Flamini	30	EU	2013	189	10	undisclosed	Free	
21	GK	(Poland)	Łukasz Fabiański	29	EU	2007	78	0	2014	£2.0M	
22	FW	(France)	Yaya Sanogo	21	EU	2013	14	0	undisclosed	Free	
23	FW	(Denmark)	Nicklas Bendtner	26	EU	2004	171	47	2014	Youth system	
24	MF	(France)	Abou Diaby	28	EU	2006 (Winter)	179	19	2015	£2.0M	
25	DF	(England)	Carl Jenkinson	22	EU	2011	57	1	undisclosed	£1.0M	
28	DF	(England)	Kieran Gibbs	24	EU	2007	147	4	undisclosed	Youth system	
29	MF	(Sweden)	Kim Källström	31	EU	2014 (Winter)	4	0	2014	Free	On loan from Spartak Moscow
30	FW	(South Korea)	Park Chu-young	28	Non-EU	2011	7	1	2015	£1.8M	On loan to Watford
31	FW	(Japan)	Ryo Miyaichi	21	Non-EU	2011 (Winter)	7	0	undisclosed	Free	
44	FW	(Germany)	Serge Gnabry	18	EU	2012	19	1	undisclosed	Youth system	
58	MF	(Germany)	Gedion Zelalem	17	EU	2013	1	0	undisclosed	Youth system	
	DF	(Switzerland)	Johan Djourou	27	EU	2003	144	1	2015	Youth system	On loan to Hamburg
	MF	(France)	Francis Coquelin	23	EU	2008	43	0	undisclosed	Youth system	On loan to Freiburg
	FW	(Costa Rica)	Joel Campbell	21	Non-EU	2011	0	0	undisclosed	£0.9M	On loan to Olympiacos

- Last updated: 17 May 2014
- Source: Arsenal F.C. and footballdatabase.com (for EU passport, country as international player, contract ending and transfer fee)
- Ordered by squad number.

=== Reserve squad ===
As of 27 January 2014.

Note: Flags indicate national team as defined under FIFA eligibility rules; some limited exceptions apply. Players may hold more than one non-FIFA nationality.

No.	Pos.	Nation	Player
36	FW	ENG	Benik Afobe
37	FW	ENG	Chuba Akpom
38	MF	ENG	Chuks Aneke
39	FW	GHA	Zak Ansah
40	DF	ESP	Héctor Bellerín
41	DF	GHA	Daniel Boateng
42	MF	GER	Thomas Eisfeld
43	DF	ENG	Zachari Fagan
45	DF	ENG	Isaac Hayden
46	GK	MKD	Dejan Iliev

No.	Pos.	Nation	Player
47	MF	ENG	Jack Jebb
49	FW	ENG	Austin Lipman
50	GK	ARG	Emiliano Martínez
51	GK	ENG	Matt Macey
52	DF	NGR	Semi Ajayi
53	MF	SWE	Kristoffer Olsson
54	DF	ENG	Brandon Ormonde-Ottewill
55	DF	GER	Leander Siemann
56	MF	ESP	Jon Toral

=== Transfers ===
==== Transfers in ====
#	Position:	Player	Transferred from	Fee	Date	Team	Source
22	FW	(France) Yaya Sanogo	(France) Auxerre	Free transfer (Compensation ~ £390,000)	1 July 2013	First team	
20	MF	(France) Mathieu Flamini	(Italy) Milan	Free transfer	29 August 2013	First team	
11	MF	(Germany) Mesut Özil	(Spain) Real Madrid	Undisclosed (~ £42,500,000)	2 September 2013	First team	
52	DF	(Nigeria) Semi Ajayi	(England) Charlton Athletic	Free transfer	17 September 2013	Reserves	
51	GK	(England) Matt Macey	(England) Bristol Rovers	Free transfer (Compensation ~ £100,000)	23 October 2013	Reserves	

==== Loans in ====
#	Position	Player	Loaned from	Date	Loan expires	Team	Source
13	GK	(Italy) Emiliano Viviano	(Italy) Palermo	2 September 2013	End of the season	First team	
29	MF	(Sweden) Kim Källström	(Russia) Spartak Moscow	31 January 2014	End of the season	First team	

Total spending: ▼ Undisclosed (~ £42,500,000)

==== Transfers out ====
#	Position	Player	Transferred to	Fee	Date	Team	Source
38	DF	(Switzerland) Martin Angha	(Germany) Nürnberg	Free transfer	10 April 2013	Reserves	
44	MF	(England) Craig Eastmond	(England) Colchester United	Free transfer	20 May 2013	Reserves	
63	MF	(England) Jordan Wynter	(England) Bristol City	Free transfer	22 May 2013	Reserves	
55	DF	(Switzerland) Elton Monteiro	(Belgium) Club Brugge	Free transfer	24 May 2013	Reserves	
45	MF	(Netherlands) Kyle Ebecilio	(Netherlands) Twente	Free transfer	28 May 2013	Reserves	
	MF	(Brazil) Denílson	(Brazil) São Paulo	Free transfer (Released)	14 June 2013	First-team	
23	FW	(Russia) Andrey Arshavin	(Russia) Zenit St Petersburg	Free transfer (Released)	27 June 2013	First team	
62	FW	(England) Sanchez Watt	(England) Colchester United	Free transfer (Released)	28 June 2013	Reserves	
58	MF	(England) Josh Rees	(England) Nottingham Forest	Free transfer (Released)	30 June 2013	Reserves	
60	GK	(England) James Shea	(England) Needham Market	Free transfer (Released)	30 June 2013	Reserves	
24	GK	(Italy) Vito Mannone	(England) Sunderland	Undisclosed (~ £2,000,000)	3 July 2013	First team	
43	GK	(England) Reice Charles-Cook	(England) Bury	Free transfer (Released)	14 July 2013	Reserves	
53	MF	(England) Jernade Meade	(Wales) Swansea City	Free transfer (Released)	16 July 2013	Reserves	
18	DF	(France) Sébastien Squillaci	(France) Bastia	Free transfer (Released)	16 July 2013	First team	
11	DF	(Brazil) André Santos	(Brazil) Flamengo	Undisclosed	20 July 2013	First team	
	FW	(Republic of Ireland) Philip Roberts	(Scotland) Falkirk	Free transfer (Released)	26 July 2013	Reserves	
48	DF	(Bosnia and Herzegovina) Sead Hajrović	(Switzerland) Grasshopper	Free transfer (Released)	5 August 2013	Reserves	
27	FW	(Ivory Coast) Gervinho	(Italy) A.S. Roma	Undisclosed (~ £8,000,000)	8 August 2013	First-team	
29	FW	(Morocco) Marouane Chamakh	(England) Crystal Palace	Undisclosed	10 August 2013	First-team	
41	DF	(Morocco) Samir Bihmoutine	(England) Bournemouth	Free transfer (Released)	7 September 2013	Reserves	
50	MF	(Republic of Ireland) Conor Henderson	(England) Hull City	Free transfer (Released)	24 September 2013	Reserves	
48	MF	(England) Anthony Jeffrey	(England) Wycombe Wanderers	Free transfer (Released)	23 January 2014	Reserves	
57	MF	(England) Nico Yennaris	(England) Brentford	Undisclosed	27 January 2014	Reserves	
26	MF	(Ghana) Emmanuel Frimpong	(England) Barnsley	Undisclosed	31 January 2014	First Team	
56	FW	(Jamaica) Nigel Neita	(England) Metropolitan Police	Free transfer (Released)	23 March 2014	Reserves	

==== Loans out ====
#	Position	Player	Loaned to	Date	Loan expires	Team	Source
	MF	(France) Francis Coquelin	(Germany) Freiburg	5 July 2013	End of the season	First team	
	FW	(Costa Rica) Joel Campbell	(Greece) Olympiacos	26 July 2013	End of the season	First team	
38	MF	(England) Chuks Aneke	(England) Crewe Alexandra	2 August 2013	End of the season	Reserves	
	DF	(Spain) Ignasi Miquel	(England) Leicester City	9 August 2013	End of the season	Reserves	
	GK	(England) Josh Vickers	(England) Canvey Island	15 August 2013	End of the season	Academy	
	FW	(Brazil) Wellington Silva	(Spain) Real Murcia	16 August 2013	End of the season	Reserves	
50	GK	(Argentina) Emiliano Martínez	(England) Sheffield Wednesday	15 October 2013	End of the season	Reserves	
49	FW	(England) Austin Lipman	(England) Boreham Wood	25 October 2013	2 January 2014	Academy	
40	DF	(Spain) Héctor Bellerín	(England) Watford	22 November 2013	18 February 2014	Reserves	
57	MF	(England) Nico Yennaris	(England) AFC Bournemouth	28 November 2013	2 January 2014	Reserves	
48	MF	(England) Anthony Jeffrey	(England) Boreham Wood	3 December 2013	2 January 2014	Reserves	
37	FW	(England) Chuba Akpom	(England) Brentford	9 January 2014	9 February 2014	Reserves	
36	FW	(England) Benik Afobe	(England) Sheffield Wednesday	30 January 2014	End of the season	Reserves	
41	DF	(Ghana) Daniel Boateng	(Scotland) Hibernian	31 January 2014	End of the season	Reserves	
30	FW	(South Korea) Park Chu-young	(England) Watford	31 January 2014	End of the season	First team	
37	FW	(England) Chuba Akpom	(England) Coventry City	14 February 2014	24 March 2014	Reserves	
43	DF	(England) Zachari Fagan	(England) Boreham Wood	12 March 2014	26 April 2014	Reserves	

Total income: ▲ Undisclosed (~ £10,000,000)

==== Overall transfer activity ====
Spending

Summer: ▼ Undisclosed (~ £42,500,000)

Winter: £0

Total: ▼ Undisclosed (~ £42,500,000)

Income

Summer: ▲ Undisclosed (~ £10,000,000)

Winter: £0

Total: ▲ Undisclosed (~ £10,000,000)

Net expenditure

Summer: ▼ Undisclosed (~ £32,500,000)

Winter: £0

Total: ▼ Undisclosed (~ £32,500,000)

== Club ==
=== Coaching staff ===
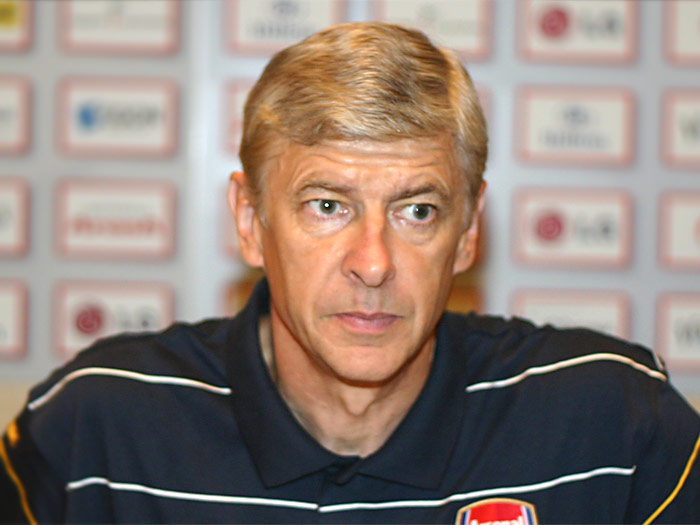
This was Arsène Wenger's 18th season with Arsenal.

Position	Staff
Manager	(France) Arsène Wenger
Assistant manager	(England) Steve Bould
First team coach	(Bosnia and Herzegovina) Boro Primorac (England) Neil Banfield
Goalkeeping coach	(Republic of Ireland) Gerry Peyton
Fitness coach	(England) Tony Colbert (England) Craig Gant (England) Andrew Rolls
Physiotherapist	(England) Colin Lewin (England) Ben Ashworth (England) Declan Lynch
Kit manager	(England) Paul Johnson (England) Vic Akers (England) Paul Akers
Masseur	(England) Darren Page (England) Chris Harvey (England) Chris Senior
Performance analyst	(England) Ben Knapper
Club doctor	(Republic of Ireland) Gary O'Driscoll
Chief scout	(England) Steve Rowley

Last updated: 1 February 2014
Source: Arsenal F.C.

=== Kit ===
Supplier: Nike / Sponsor: Fly Emirates

Home	Home alt.	Home alt. 2	Away	Away alt.	Goalkeeper 1	Goalkeeper 2	Goalkeeper 3	Goalkeeper 4

==== Kit information ====
Nike supplied their last kit for Arsenal this season, which saw an end to 20 years of contract. Puma became the club's new supplier kit for next season.

- Home: The home kit from last season was unchanged. As usual, Arsenal switched to red socks in an event of a socks clashes in some away games, and for the first time since against Birmingham City in 1982–83, navy shorts were worn against Fenerbahçe with the home kit.
- Away: The away kit used the traditional Arsenal colours of yellow and blue. The design appealed to a lot of fans. The kit was yellow with a blue polo neck collar and deep blue cuffs on the sleeves, both featuring thin yellow stripes. The away shorts were blue while the away socks featured the traditional Arsenal hoops socks design in blue and yellow, harking back to the style of those worn in the 1930s under the management of Herbert Chapman.
- Keeper: There were four goalkeeper kits, and all of them were all based on Nike's two-tone goalkeeper template. The home kit was grey and black with lime green accents. The away kit was in two shades of purple, while the third kit was in two tones of light green and was the most commonly worn strip. The fourth and the last kit, which was in two tones of silver, was only used once against Bayern Munich in the first leg.

==== Kit usage ====
Kit	Combination	Usage
Home	Red white sleeves, white shorts, white socks.	Used in all home games and against Newcastle, Tottenham, Hull, Norwich, Wigan, Borussia Dortmund and Napoli.
Home alt.	Red body, white sleeves, white shorts, red socks.	Used against Manchester City, Chelsea and Everton.
Home alt. 2	Red body, white sleeves, navy shorts and red socks.	Used once against Fenerbahçe.
Away	Yellow body, blue shorts and hooped socks.	Used against Fulham, Sunderland, Swansea, West Brom, Manchester United, Cardiff, West Ham, Aston Villa, Southampton, Liverpool, Stoke City, Marseille and Bayern Munich.
Away alt.	Yellow body, blue shorts and white socks.	Used once against Crystal Palace.

=== Other information ===
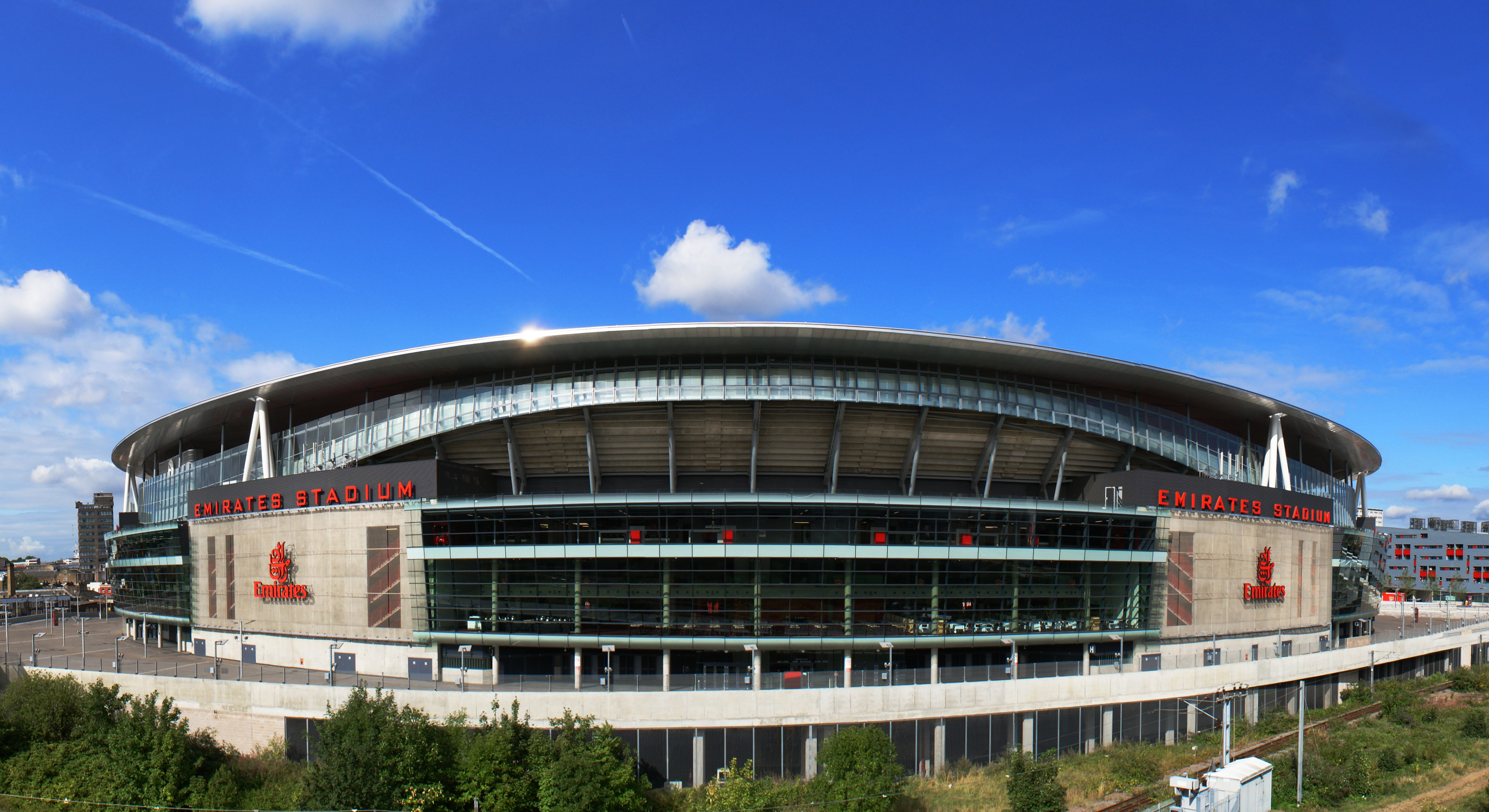
The Emirates Stadium is the second largest stadium in the Premier League.

Chairman	(England) Sir Chips Keswick
Ground (capacity and dimensions)	Emirates Stadium (60,355 / 113x76 metres)

Updated to match played 19 July 2013
Source: Arsenal F.C.

== Squad statistics ==
=== Appearances and goals ===
As of 17 May 2014

No.	Pos	Nat	Player	Total		Premier League		FA Cup		League Cup		Champions League	
No.	Pos	Nat	Player	Apps	Goals	Apps	Goals	Apps	Goals	Apps	Goals	Apps	Goals
1	GK	(Poland) POL	Wojciech Szczęsny	46	0	37+0	0	0+0	0	0+0	0	9+0	0
3	DF	(France) FRA	Bacary Sagna	48	1	34+1	1	4+0	0	0+0	0	9+0	0
4	DF	(Germany) GER	Per Mertesacker	52	3	35+0	2	5+1	1	1+0	0	10+0	0
5	DF	(Belgium) BEL	Thomas Vermaelen	21	0	7+7	0	3+0	0	2+0	0	1+1	0
6	DF	(France) FRA	Laurent Koscielny	46	3	32+0	2	4+0	1	1+0	0	9+0	0
7	MF	(Czech Republic) CZE	Tomáš Rosický	39	3	17+10	2	1+2	1	1+0	0	6+2	0
8	MF	(Spain) ESP	Mikel Arteta	43	3	27+4	2	5+0	1	1+0	0	5+1	0
9	FW	(Germany) GER	Lukas Podolski	27	12	14+6	8	4+0	3	0+0	0	2+1	1
10	MF	(England) ENG	Jack Wilshere	35	5	19+5	3	2+1	0	1+0	0	6+1	2
11	MF	(Germany) GER	Mesut Özil	40	7	25+1	5	4+1	1	0+1	0	8+0	1
12	FW	(France) FRA	Olivier Giroud	51	22	36+0	16	1+4	3	0+1	0	9+0	3
13	GK	(Italy) ITA	Emiliano Viviano	0	0	0+0	0	0+0	0	0+0	0	0+0	0
14	FW	(England) ENG	Theo Walcott	18	6	9+4	5	1+0	0	0+0	0	3+1	1
15	FW	(England) ENG	Alex Oxlade-Chamberlain	20	3	6+8	2	4+0	1	0+0	0	2+0	0
16	MF	(Wales) WAL	Aaron Ramsey	34	16	20+3	10	2+0	1	1+0	0	7+1	5
17	DF	(Spain) ESP	Nacho Monreal	36	0	13+10	0	3+0	0	2+0	0	2+6	0
19	MF	(Spain) ESP	Santi Cazorla	46	7	30+1	4	4+2	3	1+0	0	6+2	0
20	MF	(France) FRA	Mathieu Flamini	36	2	18+9	2	2+1	0	0+0	0	6+0	0
21	GK	(Poland) POL	Łukasz Fabiański	11	0	1+0	0	6+0	0	2+0	0	1+1	0
22	FW	(France) FRA	Yaya Sanogo	14	0	0+8	0	3+1	0	0+0	0	1+1	0
23	FW	(Denmark) DEN	Nicklas Bendtner	14	2	1+8	2	1+0	0	2+0	0	0+2	0
24	MF	(France) FRA	Abou Diaby	1	0	0+1	0	0+0	0	0+0	0	0+0	0
25	DF	(England) ENG	Carl Jenkinson	22	1	7+7	1	2+1	0	2+0	0	2+1	0
28	DF	(England) ENG	Kieran Gibbs	41	1	24+4	0	3+2	0	0+0	0	7+1	1
29	MF	(Sweden) SWE	Kim Källström	4	0	1+2	0	0+1	0	0+0	0	0+0	0
30	FW	(South Korea) KOR	Park Chu-young	1	0	0+0	0	0+0	0	0+1	0	0+0	0
31	FW	(Japan) JPN	Ryo Miyaichi	5	0	0+1	0	0+0	0	2+0	0	0+2	0
37	FW	(England) ENG	Chuba Akpom [R]	2	0	0+1	0	0+0	0	0+1	0	0+0	0
40	DF	(Spain) ESP	Héctor Bellerín [R]	1	0	0+0	0	0+0	0	0+1	0	0+0	0
42	MF	(Germany) GER	Thomas Eisfeld [R]	1	1	0+0	0	0+0	0	1+0	1	0+0	0
44	FW	(Germany) GER	Serge Gnabry	15	1	5+4	1	2+0	0	1+0	0	0+3	0
45	DF	(England) ENG	Isaac Hayden [R]	1	0	0+0	0	0+0	0	1+0	0	0+0	0
53	MF	(Sweden) SWE	Kristoffer Olsson [R]	1	0	0+0	0	0+0	0	0+1	0	0+0	0
58	MF	(Germany) GER	Gedion Zelalem	1	0	0+0	0	0+1	0	0+0	0	0+0	0

[R] - Reserve team player [L] - Out on loan [S] - Sold

=== Top scorers ===
Place	Position	Nationality	Number	Name	Premier League	FA Cup	League Cup	Champions League	Total
1	FW	(France)	12	Olivier Giroud	16	3	0	3	22
2	MF	(Wales)	16	Aaron Ramsey	10	1	0	5	16
3	FW	(Germany)	9	Lukas Podolski	8	3	0	1	12
4	MF	(Spain)	19	Santi Cazorla	4	3	0	0	7
4	MF	(Germany)	11	Mesut Özil	5	1	0	1	7
6	FW	(England)	14	Theo Walcott	5	0	0	1	6
7	MF	(England)	10	Jack Wilshere	3	0	0	2	5
8	MF	(Spain)	8	Mikel Arteta	2	1	0	0	3
8	DF	(France)	6	Laurent Koscielny	2	1	0	0	3
8	DF	(Germany)	4	Per Mertesacker	2	1	0	0	3
8	MF	(England)	15	Alex Oxlade-Chamberlain	2	1	0	0	3
8	MF	(Czech Republic)	7	Tomáš Rosický	2	1	0	0	3
13	FW	(Denmark)	23	Nicklas Bendtner	2	0	0	0	2
13	MF	(France)	20	Mathieu Flamini	2	0	0	0	2
15	MF	(Germany)	42	Thomas Eisfeld	0	0	1	0	1
15	DF	(England)	28	Kieran Gibbs	0	0	0	1	1
15	FW	(Germany)	44	Serge Gnabry	1	0	0	0	1
15	DF	(England)	25	Carl Jenkinson	1	0	0	0	1
15	DF	(France)	3	Bacary Sagna	1	0	0	0	1
TOTALS					68	16	1	14	99

Last updated: 17 May 2014
Source: Competitions
Competitive matches only

=== Disciplinary record ===
Number	Nationality	Position	Name	Premier League		FA Cup		League Cup		Champions League		Total	
Number	Nationality	Position	Name	Yellow card	Red card	Yellow card	Red card	Yellow card	Red card	Yellow card	Red card	Yellow card	Red card
8	(Spain)	MF	Mikel Arteta	3	1	0	0	1	0	2	1*	6	2
20	(France)	MF	Mathieu Flamini	8	1	2	0	0	0	0	0	10	1
1	(Poland)	GK	Wojciech Szczęsny	2	0	0	0	0	0	1	1	3	1
28	(England)	DF	Kieran Gibbs	2	1	0	0	0	0	0	0	2	1
6	(France)	DF	Laurent Koscielny	1	1	0	0	0	0	0	0	1	1
7	(Czech Republic)	MF	Tomáš Rosický	7	0	0	0	0	0	2	0	9	0
12	(France)	FW	Olivier Giroud	4	0	2	0	0	0	1	0	7	0
10	(England)	MF	Jack Wilshere	6	0	1	0	0	0	0	0	7	0
16	(Wales)	MF	Aaron Ramsey	3	0	0	0	0	0	3	0	6	0
3	(France)	DF	Bacary Sagna	6	0	0	0	0	0	0	0	6	0
4	(Germany)	DF	Per Mertesacker	3	0	0	0	0	0	1	0	4	0
17	(Spain)	DF	Nacho Monreal	2	0	1	0	1	0	0	0	4	0
5	(Belgium)	DF	Thomas Vermaelen	0	0	1	0	1	0	1	0	3	0
19	(Spain)	MF	Santi Cazorla	2	0	0	0	0	0	0	0	2	0
45	(England)	DF	Isaac Hayden	0	0	0	0	1	0	0	0	1	0
25	(England)	DF	Carl Jenkinson	1	0	0	0	0	0	0	0	1	0
29	(Sweden)	MF	Kim Källström	1	0	0	0	0	0	0	0	1	0
11	(Germany)	MF	Mesut Özil	0	0	0	0	0	0	1	0	1	0
9	(Germany)	FW	Lukas Podolski	0	0	0	0	0	0	1	0	1	0
22	(France)	FW	Yaya Sanogo	0	0	0	0	0	0	1	0	1	0
14	(England)	FW	Theo Walcott	1	0	0	0	0	0	0	0	1	0
			TOTALS	51	4	7	0	4	0	14	2	76	6

Last updated:17 May 2014
Source: Competitions
Competitive matches only
* indicates a second yellow card ( (yellow card) (yellow-red card) )

=== Captains ===
No.	P	Name	Country	No. games	Notes
8	MF	Arteta	(Spain)	26	Club Vice-Captain
4	DF	Mertesacker	(Germany)	16	Club Third Captain
5	DF	Vermaelen	(Belgium)	13	Club Captain
3	DF	Sagna	(France)	1	

Last updated: 17 May 2014
Source: Competitive match reports.
Competitive matches only
Matches started as captain only
Country: FIFA nationality; No.: Squad number; P: Position; Name: Player name; No. Games: Number of games started as captain.

== Pre-season and friendlies ==
14 July 2013 Asia Tour	Indonesia	0–7	(England) Arsenal	Jakarta, Indonesia
20:45 UTC+7; 14:45 BST		Report	Walcott 19'; Akpom 54'; Giroud 70', 73'; Podolski 83'; Olsson 85'; Eisfeld 86'	Stadium: GBK Stadium; Attendance: 40,489; Referee: Shuhaizi Bin Shukri (Malaysia)

17 July 2013 Asia Tour	Vietnam	1–7	(England) Arsenal	Hanoi, Vietnam
19:00 UTC+7; 13:00 BST	Trần Mạnh Dũng 78', (yellow card) 79'; Trần Bửu Ngọc (red card) 89'	Report	Giroud 6', 44', 45'; Oxlade-Chamberlain 46'; Akpom 57', 59'; Miquel 75'	Stadium: Mỹ Đình National Stadium; Attendance: 40,000; Referee: Leow Thiam Hoe (Singapore)

22 July 2013 Asia Tour	Nagoya Grampus (Japan)	1–3	(England) Arsenal	Nagoya, Japan
19:30 JST; 11:30 BST	Yano 71'	Report	Giroud 3'; Miyaichi 26' (pen.); Walcott 55'	Stadium: Toyota Stadium; Attendance: 42,919; Referee: Yoshida Toshimitsu (Japan)

26 July 2013 Asia Tour; Saitama City Cup	Urawa Red Diamonds (Japan)	1–2	(England) Arsenal	Saitama, Japan
19:30 JST; 11:30 BST	Abe 59'	Report	Podolski 49'; Akpom 82'	Stadium: Saitama Stadium 2002; Attendance: 63,000
Note: Arsenal win the Saitama City Cup

3 August 2013 Emirates Cup	Arsenal (England)	2–2	(Italy) Napoli	London
16:20 BST	Giroud 71'; Koscielny 86'	Report	Insigne 7'; Pandev 28'; Dossena (yellow card) 80'	Stadium: Emirates Stadium; Attendance: 59,554; Referee: Kevin Friend

4 August 2013 Emirates Cup	Arsenal (England)	1–2	(Turkey) Galatasaray	London
16:20 BST	Walcott 39'	Report	Drogba 78' (pen.), 87'; Gülselam (yellow card) 79'	Stadium: Emirates Stadium; Attendance: 59,608; Referee: Jonathan Moss

10 August 2013 Friendly	Arsenal (England)	3–1	(England) Manchester City	Helsinki, Finland
17:00 EET; 15:00 BST	Walcott 9'; Ramsey 59'; Giroud 62'; Pérez (yellow card) 81'	Report	Kompany (yellow card) 24'; Negredo 80'	Stadium: Helsinki Olympic Stadium; Attendance: 39,216

Last updated: 14 April 2014
Source:Arsenal F.C.

== Competitions ==
=== Overall ===
Competition	Started round	Final position / round	First match	Last match
Premier League	—	4th	17 August 2013	11 May 2014
League Cup	3rd round	4th round	25 September 2013	29 October 2013
FA Cup	3rd round	Winners	4 January 2014	17 May 2014
UEFA Champions League	Play-off round	Round of 16	21 August 2013	11 March 2014

Updated to match played 17 May 2014
Source: Competitions

=== Premier League ===
==== League table ====
Pos	Team	Pld	W	D	L	GF	GA	GD	Pts	Qualification or relegation
2	Liverpool	38	26	6	6	101	50	+51	84	Qualification for the Champions League group stage
3	Chelsea	38	25	7	6	71	27	+44	82	Qualification for the Champions League group stage
4	Arsenal	38	24	7	7	68	41	+27	79	Qualification for the Champions League play-off round
5	Everton	38	21	9	8	61	39	+22	72	Qualification for the Europa League group stage
6	Tottenham Hotspur	38	21	6	11	55	51	+4	69	Qualification for the Europa League play-off round (Note: Since the winners of 2013–14 Football League Cup (Manchester City) qualified for the Champions League, the spot awarded to them (Europa League play-off round) was passed to the 6th-placed team.)

Source: Barclays Premier League
Rules for classification: 1) Points; 2) Goal difference; 3) Goals scored; 4) Play-offs (only if needed to decide champion, teams for relegation or teams for UEFA competitions).

==== Results summary ====
Overall								Home						Away					
Pld	W	D	L	GF	GA	GD	Pts	W	D	L	GF	GA	GD	W	D	L	GF	GA	GD
38	24	7	7	68	41	+27	79	13	5	1	36	11	+25	11	2	6	32	30	+2

Last updated: 11 May 2014.
Source: Premier League

==== Results by matchday ====
Matchday	1	2	3	4	5	6	7	8	9	10	11	12	13	14	15	16	17	18	19	20	21	22	23	24	25	26	27	28	29	30	31	32	33	34	35	36	37	38
Ground	H	A	H	A	H	A	A	H	A	H	A	H	A	H	H	A	H	A	A	H	A	H	A	H	A	H	H	A	A	A	H	H	A	H	A	H	H	A
Result	L	W	W	W	W	W	D	W	W	W	L	W	W	W	D	L	D	W	W	W	W	W	D	W	L	D	W	L	W	L	D	D	L	W	W	W	W	W
Position	18	8	4	2	1	1	1	1	1	1	1	1	1	1	1	1	2	1	1	1	1	1	1	1	2	2	2	3	3	4	4	4	4	4	4	4	4	4

Updated to match(es) played on 4 May 2014. Source: Statto.com
A = Away; H = Home; W = Win; D = Draw; L = Loss

==== Matches ====
17 August 2013 1	Arsenal	1–3	Aston Villa	London
15:00 BST	Giroud 6'; Szczęsny (yellow card) 21'; Wilshere (yellow card) 30'; Koscielny (yellow card) 61' (yellow-red card) 67'; Cazorla (yellow card) 79'	Report	Benteke 22', 61' (pen.), (yellow card) 60'; Vlaar (yellow card) 30'; Luna (yellow card) 45+4', (goal) 86'; Westwood (yellow card) 65'; Agbonlahor (yellow card) 90+5'	Stadium: Emirates Stadium; Attendance: 60,003; Referee: Anthony Taylor

24 August 2013 2	Fulham	1–3	Arsenal	London
12:45 BST	Parker (yellow card) 73'; Bent 77'; Kasami (yellow card) 78'	Report	Giroud 14'; Ramsey (yellow card) 21'; Podolski 41', 68'; Wilshere (yellow card) 80'	Stadium: Craven Cottage; Attendance: 25,622; Referee: Howard Webb

1 September 2013 3	Arsenal	1–0	Tottenham Hotspur	London
16:00 BST	Giroud 23'; Rosický (yellow card) 33'; Flamini (yellow card) 55'	Report	Defoe (yellow card) 81'	Stadium: Emirates Stadium; Attendance: 60,071; Referee: Michael Oliver

14 September 2013 4	Sunderland	1–3	Arsenal	Sunderland
15:00 BST	Gardner 48' (pen.), (yellow card) 52'	Report	Giroud 11'; Flamini (yellow card) 60'; Ramsey 68', 76'; Sagna (yellow card) 72'	Stadium: Stadium of Light; Attendance: 39,055; Referee: Martin Atkinson

22 September 2013 5	Arsenal	3–1	Stoke City	London
13:30 BST	Ramsey 5'; Mertesacker 36'; Sagna 72'	Report	Cameron 26'; Huth (yellow card) 53'; Ireland (yellow card) 90+1'	Stadium: Emirates Stadium; Attendance: 60,002; Referee: Mike Dean

28 September 2013 6	Swansea City	1–2	Arsenal	Swansea
17:30 BST	De Guzmán (yellow card) 80'; Davies 82'; Chico (yellow card) 84'; Cañas (yellow card) 84'	Report	Gnabry 58'; Flamini (yellow card) 60'; Ramsey 62'; Arteta (yellow card) 90+3'	Stadium: Liberty Stadium; Attendance: 20,712; Referee: Mark Clattenburg

6 October 2013 7	West Bromwich Albion	1–1	Arsenal	West Bromwich
16:00 BST	Yacob 42'; Olsson (yellow card) 54'	Report	Flamini (yellow card) 23'; Wilshere (yellow card) 45+2', (goal) 63'	Stadium: The Hawthorns; Attendance: 24,839; Referee: Lee Mason

19 October 2013 8	Arsenal	4–1	Norwich City	London
15:00 BST	Wilshere 18'; Özil 58', 88'; Ramsey 83'	Report	Howson 70'	Stadium: Emirates Stadium; Attendance: 60,009; Referee: Lee Probert

26 October 2013 9	Crystal Palace	0–2	Arsenal	London
12:45 BST		Report	Arteta 47' (pen.), (red card) 65'; Giroud 87'	Stadium: Selhurst Park; Attendance: 20,050; Referee: Chris Foy

2 November 2013 10	Arsenal	2–0	Liverpool	London
17:30 GMT	Cazorla 19'; Sagna (yellow card) 26'; Ramsey 59'; Jenkinson (yellow card) 90'	Report	Cissokho (yellow card) 28'	Stadium: Emirates Stadium; Attendance: 60,042; Referee: Martin Atkinson

10 November 2013 11	Manchester United	1–0	Arsenal	Manchester
16:10 GMT	Van Persie 27'; Jones (yellow card) 42'; Rooney (yellow card) 75'	Report	Sagna (yellow card) 31'; Flamini (yellow card) 44'; Wilshere (yellow card) 81'	Stadium: Old Trafford; Attendance: 75,138; Referee: Michael Oliver

23 November 2013 12	Arsenal	2–0	Southampton	London
15:15 GMT	Giroud 22', 86' (pen.)	Report	Hooiveld (yellow card) 45+2'; Wanyama (yellow card) 48'; Fonte (yellow card) 86'	Stadium: Emirates Stadium; Attendance: 60,007; Referee: Mark Clattenburg

30 November 2013 13	Cardiff City	0–3	Arsenal	Cardiff
15:00 GMT		Report	Ramsey 29', 90+3', (yellow card) 89'; Gibbs (yellow card) 33'; Arteta (yellow card) 79'; Flamini 86'	Stadium: Cardiff City Stadium; Attendance: 27,948; Referee: Lee Mason

4 December 2013 14	Arsenal	2–0	Hull City	London
19:45 GMT	Bendtner 2'; Özil 47'	Report		Stadium: Emirates Stadium; Attendance: 60,017; Referee: Andre Marriner

8 December 2013 15	Arsenal	1–1	Everton	London
16:00 GMT	Özil 80'	Report	Barry (yellow card) 43'; McCarthy (yellow card) 61'; Howard (yellow card) 77'; Deulofeu 84', (yellow card) 89'	Stadium: Emirates Stadium; Attendance: 60,001; Referee: Howard Webb

14 December 2013 16	Manchester City	6–3	Arsenal	Manchester
12:45 GMT	Agüero 14'; Negredo 39'; Silva (yellow card) 49', (goal) 66'; Fernandinho 50', 88'; Kompany (yellow card) 80'; Touré 90+6' (pen.)	Report	Walcott 31', 62'; Mertesacker 90+4'; Szczęsny (yellow card) 90+5'	Stadium: Etihad Stadium; Attendance: 47,229; Referee: Martin Atkinson

23 December 2013 17	Arsenal	0–0	Chelsea	London
20:00 GMT	Walcott (yellow card) 65'; Rosický (yellow card) 70'	Report	Ramires (yellow card) 63'	Stadium: Emirates Stadium; Attendance: 60,039; Referee: Mike Dean

26 December 2013 18	West Ham United	1–3	Arsenal	London
15:00 GMT	O'Brien (yellow card) 20'; Cole 46'	Report	Cazorla (yellow card) 61'; Walcott 68', 71'; Podolski 79'	Stadium: Boleyn Ground; Attendance: 34,977; Referee: Phil Dowd

29 December 2013 19	Newcastle United	0–1	Arsenal	Newcastle upon Tyne
13:30 GMT		Report	Giroud (yellow card) 36', (goal) 65'; Flamini (yellow card) 75'; Rosický (yellow card) 76'	Stadium: St James' Park; Attendance: 52,161; Referee: Lee Probert

1 January 2014 20	Arsenal	2–0	Cardiff City	London
15:00 GMT	Mertesacker (yellow card) 30'; Bendtner 88'; Walcott 90+2'	Report	Turner (yellow card) 55'; Marshall (yellow card) 60'	Stadium: Emirates Stadium; Attendance: 60,004; Referee: Jonathan Moss

13 January 2014 21	Aston Villa	1–2	Arsenal	Birmingham
20:00 GMT	El Ahmadi (yellow card) 2'; Benteke 76'; Agbonlahor (yellow card) 85'	Report	Monreal (yellow card) 32'; Wilshere 34', (yellow card) 90+6'; Giroud 35'	Stadium: Villa Park; Attendance: 36,097; Referee: Neil Swarbrick

18 January 2014 22	Arsenal	2–0	Fulham	London
15:00 GMT	Cazorla 57', 62'	Report		Stadium: Emirates Stadium; Attendance: 60,000; Referee: Lee Probert

28 January 2014 23	Southampton	2–2	Arsenal	Southampton
19:45 GMT	Fonte 21'; Lallana 54'	Report	Giroud (yellow card) 31', (goal) 48'; Cazorla 52'; Flamini (red card) 80'	Stadium: St Mary's Stadium; Attendance: 31,284; Referee: Lee Mason

2 February 2014 24	Arsenal	2–0	Crystal Palace	London
16:00 GMT	Oxlade-Chamberlain 47', 73'; Mertesacker (yellow card) 86'	Report	Chamakh (yellow card) 42'; Delaney (yellow card) 68'	Stadium: Emirates Stadium; Attendance: 60,005; Referee: Jonathan Moss

8 February 2014 25	Liverpool	5–1	Arsenal	Liverpool
12:45 GMT	Škrtel 1', 10'; Sterling 16', 52'; Sturridge 20'; Henderson (yellow card) 47'	Report	Giroud (yellow card) 47'; Wilshere (yellow card) 59'; Arteta 69' (pen.)	Stadium: Anfield; Attendance: 44,701; Referee: Michael Oliver

12 February 2014 26	Arsenal	0–0	Manchester United	London
19:45 GMT	Sagna (yellow card) 87'	Report	Valencia (yellow card) 73'; Young (yellow card) 90+2'	Stadium: Emirates Stadium; Attendance: 60,021; Referee: Mark Clattenburg

22 February 2014 27	Arsenal	4–1	Sunderland	London
15:00 GMT	Giroud 5', 31'; Rosický 42'; Koscielny 57'	Report	Giaccherini (yellow card) 53', (goal) 81'	Stadium: Emirates Stadium; Attendance: 60,012; Referee: Andre Marriner

1 March 2014 28	Stoke City	1–0	Arsenal	Stoke-on-Trent
15:00 GMT	Pieters (yellow card) 44'; Walters 76' (pen.); Wilson (yellow card) 78'; Crouch (yellow card) 90+5'	Report	Rosický (yellow card) 53'	Stadium: Britannia Stadium; Attendance: 26,711; Referee: Mike Jones

16 March 2014 29	Tottenham Hotspur	0–1	Arsenal	London
16:00 GMT	Chadli (yellow card) 33'; Sandro (yellow card) 48'; Vertonghen (yellow card) 76'; Rose (yellow card) 90+3'; Soldado (yellow card) 90+5'	Report	Rosický 2'; Sagna (yellow card) 22'; Gibbs (yellow card) 45+1'; Flamini (yellow card) 80'	Stadium: White Hart Lane; Attendance: 35,711; Referee: Mike Dean

22 March 2014 30	Chelsea	6–0	Arsenal	London
12:45 GMT	Eto'o 5'; Schürrle 7'; Hazard 17' (pen.); Oscar 42', 66'; Salah 71'	Report	Gibbs (red card) 15'; Rosický (yellow card) 52'	Stadium: Stamford Bridge; Attendance: 41,614; Referee: Andre Marriner

25 March 2014 31	Arsenal	2–2	Swansea City	London
19:45 GMT	Podolski 73'; Giroud 74'	Report	Bony 11', (yellow card) 34'; Flamini 90' (o.g.)	Stadium: Emirates Stadium; Attendance: 59,937; Referee: Lee Probert

29 March 2014 32	Arsenal	1–1	Manchester City	London
17:30 GMT	Rosický (yellow card) 42'; Flamini 53'	Report	Silva 18', (yellow card) 45+1'; Touré (yellow card) 31'; Kompany (yellow card) 33'; García (yellow card) 89'	Stadium: Emirates Stadium; Attendance: 60,060; Referee: Mike Dean

6 April 2014 33	Everton	3–0	Arsenal	Liverpool
13:30 BST	Osman (yellow card) 6'; Naismith 14'; Lukaku 34'; Arteta 61' (o.g.)	Report	Flamini (yellow card) 43'; Arteta (yellow card) 90'	Stadium: Goodison Park; Attendance: 39,504; Referee: Martin Atkinson

15 April 2014 34	Arsenal	3–1	West Ham United	London
19:45 BST	Rosický (yellow card) 15'; Podolski 44', 78'; Giroud 55'; Källström (yellow card) 63'	Report	Nocerino (yellow card) 37'; Jarvis 40'; Diamé (yellow card) 60'	Stadium: Emirates Stadium; Attendance: 59,977; Referee: Kevin Friend

20 April 2014 35	Hull City	0–3	Arsenal	Kingston upon Hull
14:05 BST	Meyler (yellow card) 16'	Report	Mertesacker (yellow card) 14'; Ramsey 31'; Podolski 45', 54'	Stadium: KC Stadium; Attendance: 24,762; Referee: Jonathan Moss

28 April 2014 36	Arsenal	3–0	Newcastle United	London
20:00 BST	Koscielny 26', (yellow card) 26'; Ramsey (yellow card) 35'; Özil 42'; Giroud 67'; Sagna (yellow card) 75'	Report	Sissoko (yellow card) 25'; Tioté (yellow card) 45+3'	Stadium: Emirates Stadium; Attendance: 60,023; Referee: Neil Swarbrick

4 May 2014 37	Arsenal	1–0	West Bromwich Albion	London
13:30 BST	Giroud 14', (yellow card) 90+1'; Monreal (yellow card) 64'	Report	Brunt (yellow card) 83'; Dorrans (yellow card) 90+1'	Stadium: Emirates Stadium; Attendance: 60,021; Referee: Mike Jones

11 May 2014 38	Norwich City	0–2	Arsenal	Norwich
15:00 BST	R. Bennett (yellow card) 80'	Report	Ramsey 53'; Jenkinson 62'	Stadium: Carrow Road; Attendance: 26,848; Referee: Lee Mason

Last updated: 11 May 2014
Source: Arsenal F.C.
Note: Premier League fixtures not listed due to copyright

=== FA Cup ===
4 January 2014 Third round	Arsenal	2–0	Tottenham Hotspur	London
17:15 GMT	Vermaelen (yellow card) 18'; Cazorla 31'; Rosický 62'	Report		Stadium: Emirates Stadium; Attendance: 59,476; Referee: Mark Clattenburg

24 January 2014 Fourth round	Arsenal	4–0	Coventry City	London
19:45 GMT	Podolski 15', 27'; Wilshere (yellow card) 39'; Giroud 84'; Cazorla 89'	Report		Stadium: Emirates Stadium; Attendance: 59,451; Referee: Robert Madley

16 February 2014 Fifth round	Arsenal	2–1	Liverpool	London
16:00 GMT	Monreal (yellow card) 7'; Oxlade-Chamberlain 16'; Flamini (yellow card) 35'; Podolski 47'	Report	Flanagan (yellow card) 15'; Coutinho (yellow card) 20'; Gerrard (yellow card) 42', (goal) 59' (pen.)	Stadium: Emirates Stadium; Attendance: 59,801; Referee: Howard Webb

8 March 2014 Quarter-final	Arsenal	4–1	Everton	London
12:45 GMT	Özil 7'; Flamini (yellow card) 24'; Giroud (yellow card) 68', (goal) 83', 85'; Arteta 68' (pen.)	Report	Lukaku 32'; McCarthy (yellow card) 69'	Stadium: Emirates Stadium; Attendance: 59,719; Referee: Mark Clattenburg

12 April 2014 Semi–Final	Wigan Athletic	1–1 (a.e.t.) (2–4 p)	Arsenal	London
17:07 BST	J. Gómez 63' (pen.), (yellow card) 79'; McArthur (yellow card) 90+3'; Collison (yellow card) 90+4'; Beausejour (yellow card) 120+1'	Report	Mertesacker 82'	Stadium: Wembley Stadium; Attendance: 82,185; Referee: Michael Oliver
	Penalties
	Caldwell (penalty missed); Collison (penalty missed); Beausejour (penalty scored); McArthur (penalty scored)		(penalty scored) Arteta; (penalty scored) Källström; (penalty scored) Giroud; (penalty scored) Cazorla

17 May 2014 Final	Arsenal	3–2 (a.e.t.)	Hull City	London
17:00 BST	Cazorla 17'; Koscielny 71'; Giroud (yellow card) 85'; Ramsey 109'	Report	Chester 4'; Davies 8', (yellow card) 86'; Huddlestone (yellow card) 60'; Meyler (yellow card) 70'	Stadium: Wembley Stadium; Attendance: 89,346; Referee: Lee Probert

Last updated: 17 May 2014
Source: Arsenal F.C.

=== League Cup ===
25 September 2013 Third round	West Bromwich Albion	1–1 (a.e.t.) (3–4 p)	Arsenal	West Bromwich
20:00 BST	Berahino 71'; Lugano (yellow card) 89'; Popov (yellow card) 90'; Reid (yellow card) 99'	Report	Hayden (yellow card) 34'; Monreal (yellow card) 36'; Vermaelen (yellow card) 52'; Eisfeld 61'; Arteta (yellow card) 85'	Stadium: The Hawthorns; Attendance: 18,649; Referee: Robert Madley
	Penalties
	Reid (penalty scored); Rosenberg (penalty scored); Morrison (penalty scored); Dawson (penalty missed); Amalfitano (penalty missed)		(penalty scored) Bendtner; (penalty missed) Gnabry; (penalty scored) Olsson; (penalty scored) Akpom; (penalty scored) Monreal

29 October 2013 Fourth round	Arsenal	0–2	Chelsea	London
19:45 GMT		Report	Azpilicueta 25'; Mikel (yellow card) 29'; Mata 66'; Essien (yellow card) 75'	Stadium: Emirates Stadium; Attendance: 59,455; Referee: Phil Dowd

Last updated: 14 April 2014
Source: Arsenal F.C.

=== UEFA Champions League ===
==== Play-off round ====
21 August 2013 First leg	Fenerbahçe (Turkey)	0–3	(England) Arsenal	Istanbul, Turkey
19:45 BST	Webó (yellow card) 30'; Alves (yellow card) 65'; Kadlec (yellow card) 76'	Report	Gibbs 51'; Ramsey 64'; Szczęsny (yellow card) 75'; Giroud 77' (pen.)	Stadium: Şükrü Saracoğlu Stadium; Attendance: 40,375; Referee: Gianluca Rocchi (Italy)

27 August 2013 Second leg	Arsenal (England)	2–0 (5–0 agg.)	(Turkey) Fenerbahçe	London, England
19:45 BST	Ramsey 25', 72', (yellow card) 70'; Mertesacker (yellow card) 35'	Report	Korkmaz (yellow card) 29'; Emenike (yellow card) 55'; Meireles (yellow card) 78'; Gönül (yellow card) 88'	Stadium: Emirates Stadium; Attendance: 56,271; Referee: Carlos Velasco Carballo (Spain)

==== Group stage ====
Pos	Team	Pld	W	D	L	GF	GA	GD	Pts	Qualification	DOR	ARS	NAP	MAR
1	(Germany) Borussia Dortmund	6	4	0	2	11	6	+5	12 (Note: Tied on head-to-head points (6). Head-to-head goal difference: Borussia Dortmund +1, Arsenal 0, Napoli −1.)	Advance to knockout phase	—	0–1	3–1	3–0
2	(England) Arsenal	6	4	0	2	8	5	+3	12	Advance to knockout phase	1–2	—	2–0	2–0
3	(Italy) Napoli	6	4	0	2	10	9	+1	12	Transfer to Europa League	2–1	2–0	—	3–2
4	(France) Marseille	6	0	0	6	5	14	−9	0		1–2	1–2	1–2	—

Source: UEFA
Notes:

18 September 2013 1	Marseille (France)	1–2	(England) Arsenal	Marseille, France
19:45 BST	N'Koulou (yellow card) 41'; J. Ayew 90+3' (pen.)	Report	Ramsey (yellow card) 54', (goal) 84'; Walcott 64'	Stadium: Stade Vélodrome; Attendance: 38,380; Referee: Olegário Benquerença (Portugal)

1 October 2013 2	Arsenal (England)	2–0	(Italy) Napoli	London, England
19:45 BST	Özil 8'; Giroud 15'	Report		Stadium: Emirates Stadium; Attendance: 59,536; Referee: Milorad Mažić (Serbia)

22 October 2013 3	Arsenal (England)	1–2	(Germany) Borussia Dortmund	London, England
19:45 BST	Giroud 41'; Rosický (yellow card) 51'; Özil (yellow card) 85'	Report	Mkhitaryan 16'; Hummels (yellow card) 22'; Lewandowski (yellow card) 64', (goal) 82'; Bender (yellow card) 71'	Stadium: Emirates Stadium; Attendance: 60,011; Referee: Jonas Eriksson (Sweden)

6 November 2013 4	Borussia Dortmund (Germany)	0–1	(England) Arsenal	Dortmund, Germany
19:45 GMT	Lewandowski (yellow card) 41'	Report	Arteta (yellow card) 23'; Ramsey 62'	Stadium: Signal Iduna Park; Attendance: 65,829; Referee: Björn Kuipers (Netherlands)

26 November 2013 5	Arsenal (England)	2–0	(France) Marseille	London, England
19:45 GMT	Wilshere 1', 65'	Report	N'Koulou (yellow card) 37'; Morel (yellow card) 38'; Romao (yellow card) 81'	Stadium: Emirates Stadium; Attendance: 59,912; Referee: Antonio Lahoz (Spain)

11 December 2013 6	Napoli (Italy)	2–0	(England) Arsenal	Naples, Italy
19:45 GMT	Mertens (yellow card) 36'; Džemaili (yellow card) 41'; Higuaín 73'; Fernández (yellow card) 84'; Callejón 90+3'	Report	Arteta (yellow card) 63' (yellow-red card) 76'; Giroud (yellow card) 67'; Ramsey (yellow card) 84'	Stadium: Stadio San Paolo; Attendance: 34,027; Referee: Viktor Kassai (Hungary)

==== Knockout phase ====
===== Round of 16 =====
19 February 2014 First leg	Arsenal (England)	0–2	(Germany) Bayern Munich	London, England
19:45 GMT	Szczęsny (red card) 37'; Sanogo (yellow card) 55'; Rosický (yellow card) 86'	Report	Boateng (yellow card) 8'; Mandžukić (yellow card) 45+2'; Kroos 54'; Müller 88'	Stadium: Emirates Stadium; Attendance: 59,911; Referee: Nicola Rizzoli (Italy)

11 March 2014 Second leg	Bayern Munich (Germany)	1–1 (3–1 agg.)	(England) Arsenal	Munich, Germany
19:45 GMT	Dante (yellow card) 8'; Schweinsteiger 55'; Martínez (yellow card) 79'	Report	Podolski (yellow card) 26', (goal) 57'; Arteta (yellow card) 29'; Vermaelen (yellow card) 83'	Stadium: Allianz Arena; Attendance: 68,000; Referee: Svein Oddvar Moen (Norway)

Last updated: 14 April 2014
Source: Arsenal F.C.

== Awards ==
=== Arsenal Player of the Month award ===
Awarded monthly to the player that was chosen by fan voting on Arsenal.com

Month	Player	Votes
August	(Wales) Aaron Ramsey	77.1%
September	(Wales) Aaron Ramsey	72.2%
October	(Wales) Aaron Ramsey	26.8%
November	(Wales) Aaron Ramsey	48.1%
December	(England) Theo Walcott	42.3%
January	(Spain) Santi Cazorla	57.4%
February	(England) Alex Oxlade-Chamberlain	46%
March	(Czech Republic) Tomáš Rosický	63.7%
April	(Germany) Lukas Podolski	61.5%

=== Premier League Manager of the Month award ===
Awarded monthly to the manager that was chosen by a panel assembled by the Premier League's sponsor

Month	Manager
September	(France) Arsène Wenger

=== Premier League Player of the Month award ===
Awarded monthly to the player that was chosen by a panel assembled by the Premier League's sponsor

Month	Player
September	(Wales) Aaron Ramsey
