= Yaya Sanogo =

French footballer (born 1993)

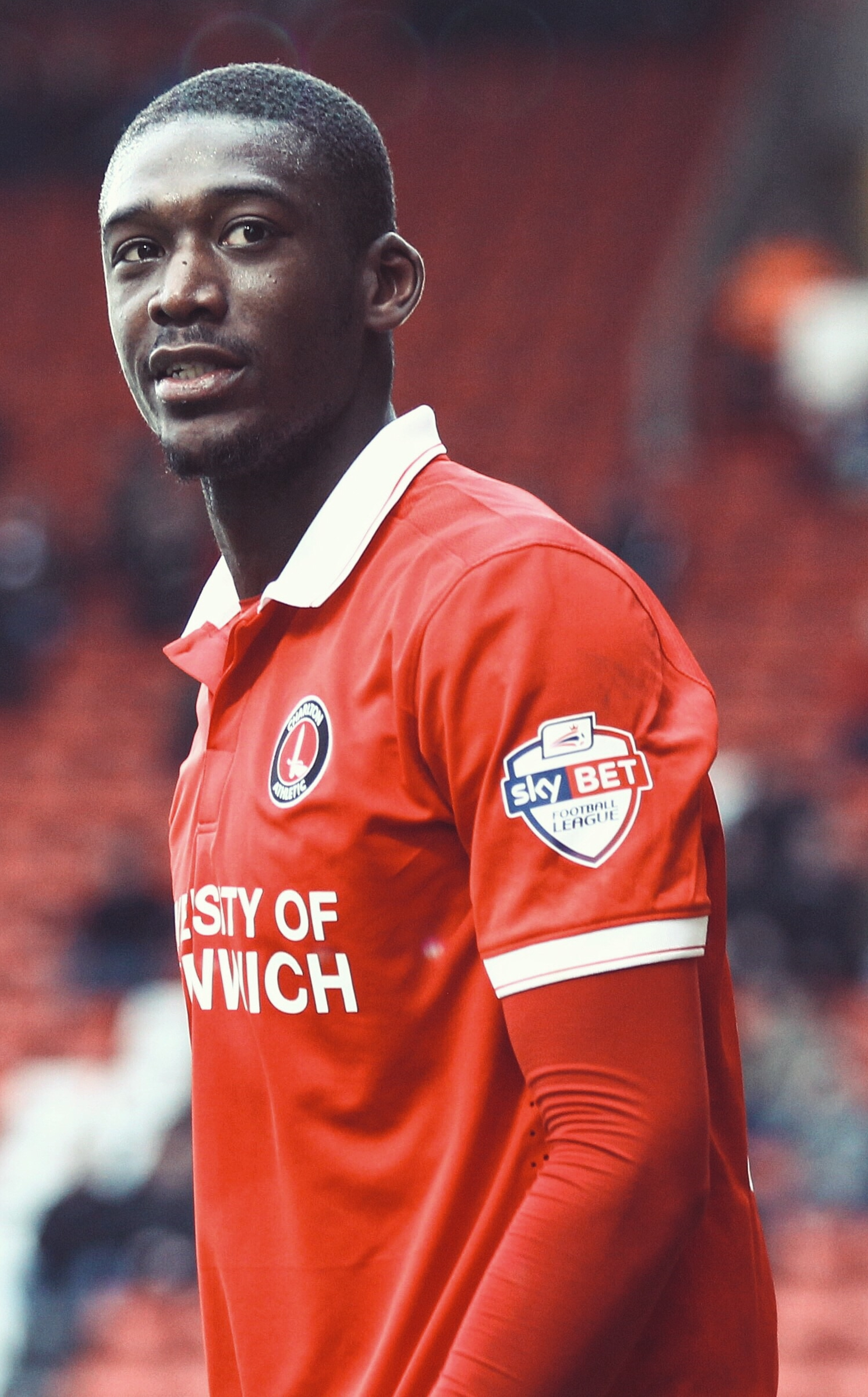
- Sanogo playing for Charlton Athletic in 2016

Personal information
- Full name: Yaya Sanogo
- Date of birth: 27 January 1993 (age 33)
- Place of birth: Massy, France
- Height: 1.91 m (6 ft 3 in)
- Position: Striker

Youth career
- 2005–2006: Les Ulis
- 2006–2010: Auxerre

Senior career*
Years	Team	Apps	(Gls)
2009–2012	Auxerre B	31	(15)
2010–2013	Auxerre	21	(11)
2013–2017	Arsenal	11	(0)
2015	→ Crystal Palace (loan)	10	(0)
2015–2016	→ Ajax (loan)	3	(0)
2015	→ Jong Ajax (loan)	3	(0)
2016	→ Charlton Athletic (loan)	8	(3)
2017–2020	Toulouse	63	(12)
2021	Huddersfield Town	9	(0)
2023–2024	Urartu	15	(6)
2024	Qingdao Red Lions	19	(6)
2025	Amazonas	0	(0)

International career
2008–2009	France U16	18	(18)
2009–2010	France U17	16	(9)
2010–2011	France U19	9	(2)
2013	France U20	10	(5)
2011–2014	France U21	8	(5)
Medal record
Men's football
Representing France
FIFA U-20 World Cup
Winner	2013 Turkey
- * Club domestic league appearances and goals as of 08:49, 14 September 2024 (UTC)

Yaya Sanogo (born 27 January 1993) is a French professional footballer who plays as a striker.

A promising youth player, he came up at local Parisian club CO Les Ulis before moving to Auxerre's youth academy. He made his debut for Auxerre in 2010 at the age of 16. In 2013, he was transferred to the Arsenal team coached by Arsène Wenger. He struggled to break into Arsenal's first team in his four seasons at the club during which time he had loan spells with Crystal Palace, Ajax, and Charlton Athletic. In 2017, he was transferred to Toulouse, where he played for three seasons. He had brief stints at Huddersfield Town in 2021 and Armenian Premier League club Urartu in 2023–24, before joining Qingdao Red Lions in China in 2024.

He is a former French youth international, and was a member of the side that won the 2013 FIFA U-20 World Cup.

== Club career ==
=== Auxerre ===
Sanogo was born in Massy, Essonne to Ivorian parents. After failing to earn selection into the prestigious Clairefontaine academy, Sanogo joined another local Parisian club CO Les Ulis, the same club that produced France national team's Thierry Henry. He spent only a year at the club before being signed up on an aspirant (youth) contract with first division club Auxerre at age 13. Sanogo quickly established himself in the club's youth system scoring 25 goals in 14 matches and also providing 17 assists in the 2006–07 edition of the Championnat Federal des 14 ans. While playing with the under-16 team, the following season, in the Championnat National des 16 ans, Sanogo averaged a goal a game. Alongside his positive displays domestically, Sanogo's prolific scoring on the international stage led to him being declared Auxerre's best overall prospect. He drew the interest of Premier League clubs Arsenal and Tottenham Hotspur before signing his first professional contract for three years on 27 October 2009.

Sanogo was not immediately promoted to the senior team and, instead, began the season playing in the Championnat National des 18 ans with the Auxerre under-18 team. On 10 October 2009, Sanogo was promoted to the team's Championnat de France Amateur team making his debut in a 2–1 loss to Pontivy. He scored his first CFA goal two weeks later in a 3–2 defeat to Romorantin. The following week, he netted again, this time with Auxerre earning a 1–0 victory over Sénart-Moissy. On 5 December, the youngster converted a hat trick against Viry-Châtillon in a 6–2 victory. The three-goal display positioned him as the team's top scorer, despite being only 16 years of age. On 24 January 2010, Auxerre manager Jean Fernandez named Sanogo to the team's squad to participate in a Coupe de France match against Sedan to be played on 26 January, a day before his 17th birthday. He was assigned the number 19 shirt. Sanogo made his professional debut in the match appearing as a substitute in the 108th minute. Auxerre won the match 3–0 on penalties after the match ended 1–1 in regular time and extra time. On 5 May 2010, Sanogo made his league debut appearing as a substitute in a 2–1 loss to Lyon.

Sanogo began the 2010–11 campaign playing with the club's reserve team in the fourth division. On 18 September 2010, while playing in a league match against Mulhouse, Sanogo suffered a fractured tibia in a 2–0 win. Two days later, the injury was confirmed by the club and the player was slated to miss an estimated five months.

Sanogo made his return to professional football at the start of the 2011–12 season making his first appearance of the campaign in a 2–1 win over Nancy in the Coupe de la Ligue. On 21 September 2011, he made his first league appearance in over 17 months appearing as a substitute in a 1–1 draw with Lorient. Four days later, Sanogo made his first professional start in a 2–1 win over Sochaux. On 6 November, he scored his first professional goal, netting the opener in a 2–0 win over Toulouse.

=== Arsenal ===
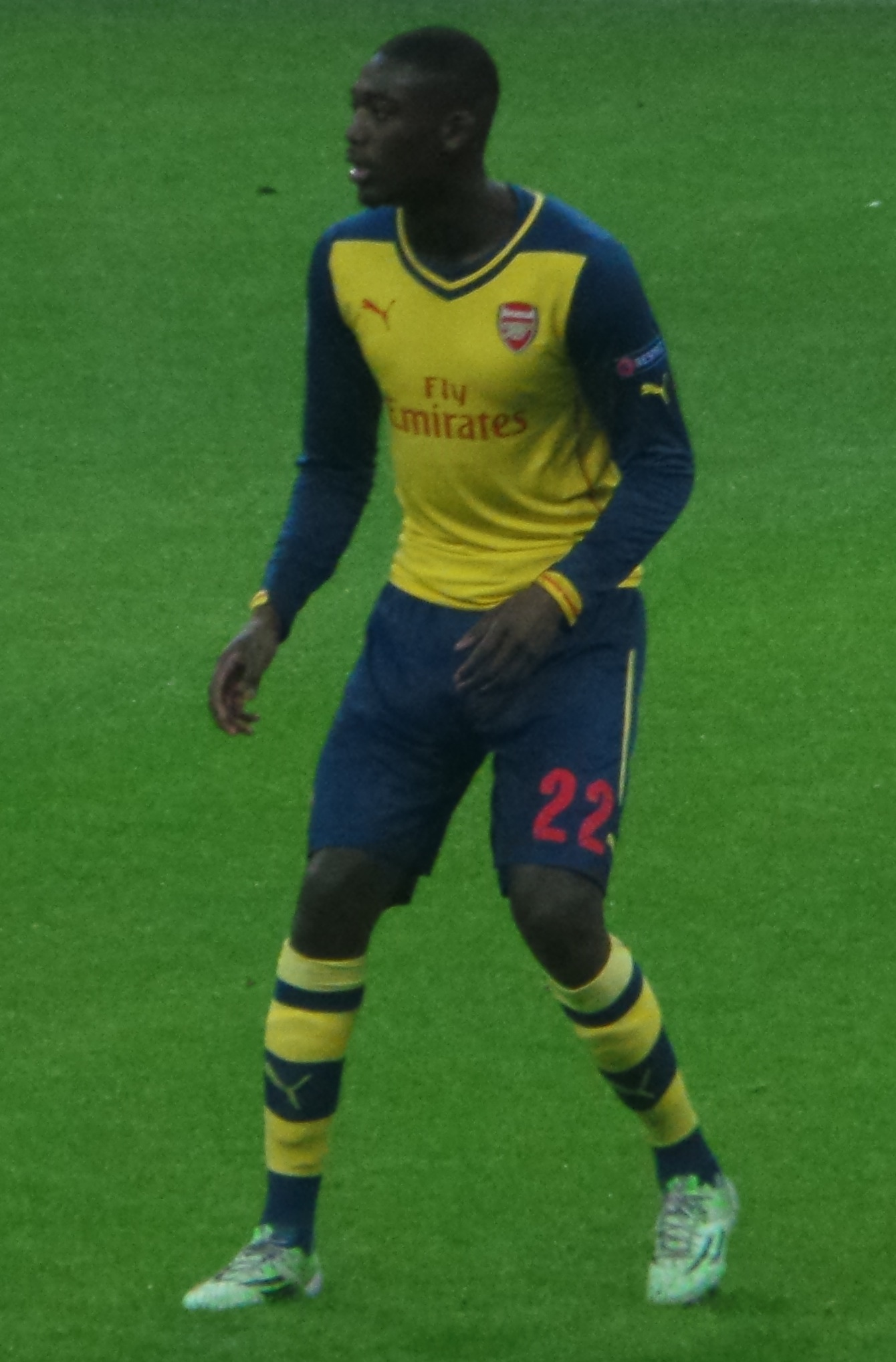
Sanogo playing for Arsenal in 2014

On 1 July 2013, it was confirmed that Sanogo had signed a long-term contract at Arsenal of the Premier League. On 5 July, Arsenal announced on its official Twitter account that Sanogo would be taking the number 22 for the 2013–14 season. The number had been used previously by Francis Coquelin, who was loaned out to SC Freiburg for the season.

On 24 August, Sanogo made his competitive debut for Arsenal against Fulham at Craven Cottage in which he came on in the 81st minute for Lukas Podolski as the Gunners went on to win the match 3–1.

Sanogo picked up a back injury during international duty with the France U21 side in mid-September and was ruled out for several weeks. Despite not playing for Arsenal since picking up the injury, Sanogo was nominated for the Golden Boy Award 2013.

On 16 February 2014, he made his first start for Arsenal in a 2–1 FA Cup win against Liverpool. His performance was praised by club manager Arsène Wenger who showed his delight and appraised Sanogo's performance as "excellent." On 20 February, Sanogo made his UEFA Champions League debut in the round-of-16 home leg against Bayern Munich. On 12 April, he played 120 minutes as Arsenal beat Wigan Athletic on penalties in the FA Cup semi-final at Wembley Stadium. On 17 May, Sanogo came on as a substitute for German international Lukas Podolski in the 2014 FA Cup Final against Hull City as Arsenal won the trophy for the first time since 2005.

During pre-season, Sanogo scored four goals in Arsenal's 5–1 win over Benfica in the Emirates Cup on 2 August 2014. On 10 August, he started as Arsenal's lone striker in the 2014 FA Community Shield, against Manchester City; he was replaced by Olivier Giroud at half time in the 3–0 win at Wembley Stadium. On 26 November, he scored his only competitive goal for Arsenal, opening a 2–0 home win over Borussia Dortmund in the second minute of the game. The result put Arsenal into the knockout stage with a game left to play.

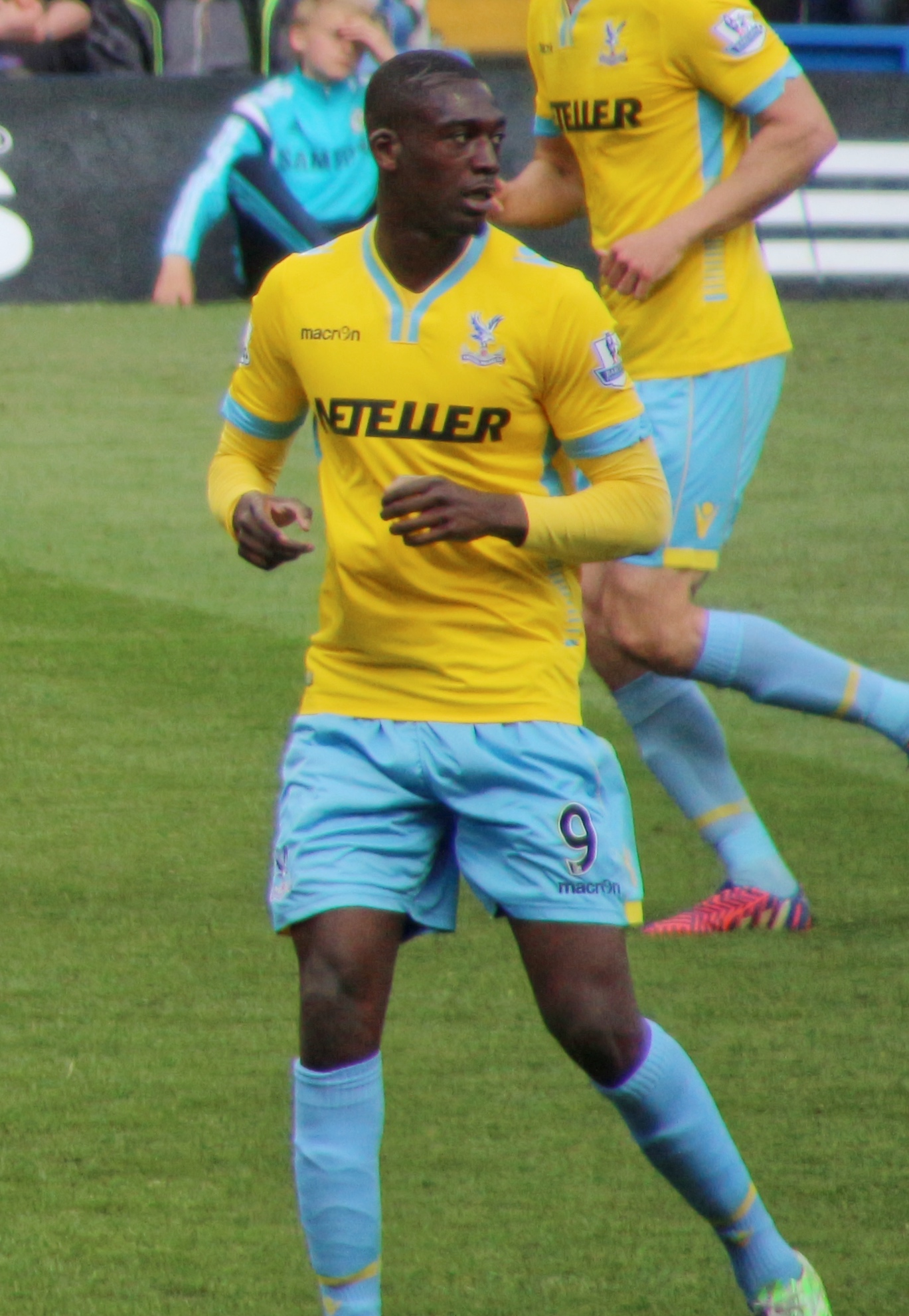
Sanogo playing for Crystal Palace in 2015

Sanogo was loaned to fellow Premier League club Crystal Palace on 13 January 2015, for the rest of the season. He was the first signing for them by Alan Pardew, who promised him more playing time. Four days later, he started in a 3–2 away win at Burnley. Sanogo scored his first goal for the club on 24 January as they beat Southampton by the same score away in the FA Cup fourth round.

On 17 July 2015, Sanogo completed a year-long loan switch to Eredivisie club Ajax. Sanogo made his professional debut for Ajax in the 2015–16 UEFA Champions League third qualifying round away match against SK Rapid Wien on 29 July 2015 which ended in a 2–2 draw. He made his regular season debut in the season opener on 9 August 2015 against AZ which ended in a 3–0 away win. He scored his first goals for Ajax in a friendly match on 10 August 2015 against Umm Salal SC from Qatar. The match ended in a 6–1 win for Ajax, with Sanogo scoring a hat-trick with goals in the 6th, 17th and 35th minutes of the match. Despite this hat trick in a pre-season friendly, he received the rather unflattering nickname Yaya Sanogoal from the Ajax fans.

On 1 February 2016, Sanago signed with Championship club Charlton Athletic on loan until the end of the season. He scored his only goals for Charlton in the form of a hat-trick in a 3–4 loss against Reading at The Valley on 27 February.

=== Toulouse ===
On 7 July 2017, following his release from Arsenal, Sanogo returned to France to join Ligue 1 side Toulouse on a three-year deal. In his first season, he scored six goals, including two late strikes in a 2–2 home draw with RC Strasbourg on 17 March. On 23 May, he netted in a 3–0 playoff final win at Ajaccio as his club stayed up.

On 7 July 2020, Sanogo was released by Toulouse. He achieved 16 goals in 70 competitive games, second to Max Gradel for the club over the three seasons.

=== Huddersfield Town ===
On 24 February 2021, Sanogo joined English Championship side Huddersfield Town on a deal until the end of the 2020–21 season. On 11 May 2021, it was confirmed that his contract would not be extended, and he departed the Terriers after nine appearances.

As of June 2022, he was still actively searching for a new club.

=== Urartu ===
On 27 January 2023, Armenian Premier League club Urartu announced the signing of Sanogo. He scored twice on his debut for the club on 27 May, a 3–2 defeat against Alashkert.

On 26 January 2024, Urartu announced that Sanogo had left the club by mutual agreement.

=== Qingdao Red Lions ===
On 5 March 2024, China League One club Qingdao Red Lions announced the signing of Sanogo. He left the club on 1 January 2025.

=== Amazonas FC ===
On 21 April 2025, Amazonas FC announced the signing of Sanogo. He left the club on 22 July 2025.

== International career ==
Born in France, Sanogo is of Ivorian descent. Sanogo has earned caps with the under-16 and under-17 teams of France. With the under-16s, Sanogo was installed as first-choice striker and scored a remarkable 18 goals in 18 games. Sanogo's notable goals during the season include a brace against Uruguay in the Tournoi du Val-de-Marne, a hat-trick against Australia and a brace against Mali in the Tournio de Montaigu, and a goal against Germany in a match that was played at the Olympic Stadium in Berlin. At the 2009 Aegean Cup, Sanogo scored a tournament-leading five goals. He scored a hat trick against Belgium in a group stage match and also scored the game-winning goal in the final against Norway, which France won 2–1.

Due to the six-month suspension of international teammate Paul Pogba, Sanogo was named captain of the under-17 team by coach Guy Ferrier and continued his spectacular form scoring a brace against Belgium in the Toto Cup in Austria. He later relinquished the captaincy in the new year giving it to Lille defender Jérémy Obin. In qualification for the 2010 UEFA European Under-17 Football Championship, Sanogo scored goals against Slovenia and Estonia, earning a brace against the latter to help the team qualify for the Elite Round portion of qualifying. Due to suffering a broken forearm while training with Auxerre, Sanogo missed the Elite Round portion, though France still qualified for the UEFA-sanction tournament without him. In the competition, Sanogo went scoreless in the first two group stage matches. In the final group stage match against Switzerland, he scored a brace in a span of four minutes in a 3–1 victory. The positive result inserted France into the semi-finals, where the team was defeated by England.

Sanogo bypassed the under-18 team and earned his first call up to the under-19 team in August 2010 to play in the Sendai Cup. In the tournament, Sanogo played in all three matches and, in the team's final group stage match against Brazil, scored a goal that was voted the goal of the tournament by the competition's organizing committee. Sanogo, himself, described the goal as "the best goal of my career". After suffering as fractured tibia domestically, he missed significant time with the team, but returned in May 2011 for Elite Round qualification for the 2011 UEFA European Under-19 Football Championship. Sanogo appeared in all three group stage matches as France failed to qualifying for the competition finishing second in its group. Due to being an underage player during the 2010–11 season, Sanogo remained eligible to represent the under-19 team for the 2011–12 season. In his first appearance of the new campaign, he scored a goal in a 2–2 draw with England at the Limoges Tournament.

Sanogo was a member of the team that won France's first ever FIFA U-20 World Cup. In that tournament held in Turkey, he was in the starting line-up for all of France's matches and he was his country's top scorer in the tournament with a total of four goals.

== Career statistics ==
As of match played 4 December 2023

Appearances and goals by club, season and competition
Season	Club	League			National cup		League cup		Continental		Other		Total	
Season	Club	Division	Apps	Goals	Apps	Goals	Apps	Goals	Apps	Goals	Apps	Goals	Apps	Goals
Auxerre B	2009–10	Championnat de France Amateur	17	9	—		—		—		—		17	9
Auxerre B	2010–11	Championnat de France Amateur	8	3	—		—		—		—		8	3
Auxerre B	2011–12	Championnat de France Amateur	3	3	—		—		—		—		3	3
Auxerre B	2012–13	Championnat de France Amateur	3	0	—		—		—		—		3	0
Auxerre B	Total		31	15	—		—		—		—		31	15
Auxerre	2009–10	Ligue 1	1	0	1	0	—		—		—		2	0
Auxerre	2010–11	Ligue 1	0	0	0	0	—		0	0	—		0	0
Auxerre	2011–12	Ligue 1	7	1	2	0	—		—		—		9	1
Auxerre	2012–13	Ligue 2	13	10	0	0	—		—		—		13	10
Auxerre	Total		21	11	3	0	—		0	0	—		24	11
Arsenal	2013–14	Premier League	8	0	4	0	0	0	2 (Note: Appearances in UEFA Champions League)	0	—		14	0
Arsenal	2014–15	Premier League	3	0	0	0	0	0	2	1	1 (Note: Appearance in FA Community Shield)	0	6	1
Arsenal	2015–16	Premier League	0	0	—		—		—		—		0	0
Arsenal	2016–17	Premier League	0	0	0	0	0	0	0	0	—		0	0
Arsenal	Total		11	0	4	0	0	0	4	1	1	0	20	1
Crystal Palace (loan)	2014–15	Premier League	10	0	1	1	—		—		—		11	1
Ajax (loan)	2015–16	Eredivisie	3	0	0	0	—		3 (Note: Two appearances in UEFA Champions League, one in UEFA Europa League)	0	—		6	0
Jong Ajax (loan)	2015–16	Eerste Divisie	3	0	—		—		—		—		3	0
Charlton Athletic (loan)	2015–16	Championship	8	3	—		—		—		—		8	3
Toulouse	2017–18	Ligue 1	27	6	1	0	3	2	—		2 (Note: Appearances in Ligue 1/Ligue 2 playoffs)	1	33	9
Toulouse	2018–19	Ligue 1	21	3	2	0	0	0	—		—		23	3
Toulouse	2019–20	Ligue 1	15	3	0	0	1	1	—		—		16	4
Toulouse	Total		63	12	3	0	4	3	0	0	2	1	72	16
Huddersfield Town	2020–21	Championship	9	0	—		—		—		—		9	0
Urartu	2022–23	Armenian Premier League	2	2	0	0	—		—		—		2	2
Urartu	2023–24	Armenian Premier League	13	4	0	0	—		1	0	1 (Note: Appearances in Armenian Supercup)	0	15	4
Urartu	Total		15	6	0	0	-	-	1	0	1	0	17	6
Career total			174	48	11	1	4	3	8	1	4	1	199	54

== Honours ==
Arsenal

- FA Cup: 2013–14
- FA Community Shield: 2014

France U20

- FIFA U-20 World Cup: 2013
