= Anthony Jeffrey =

English-born Guyanese footballer

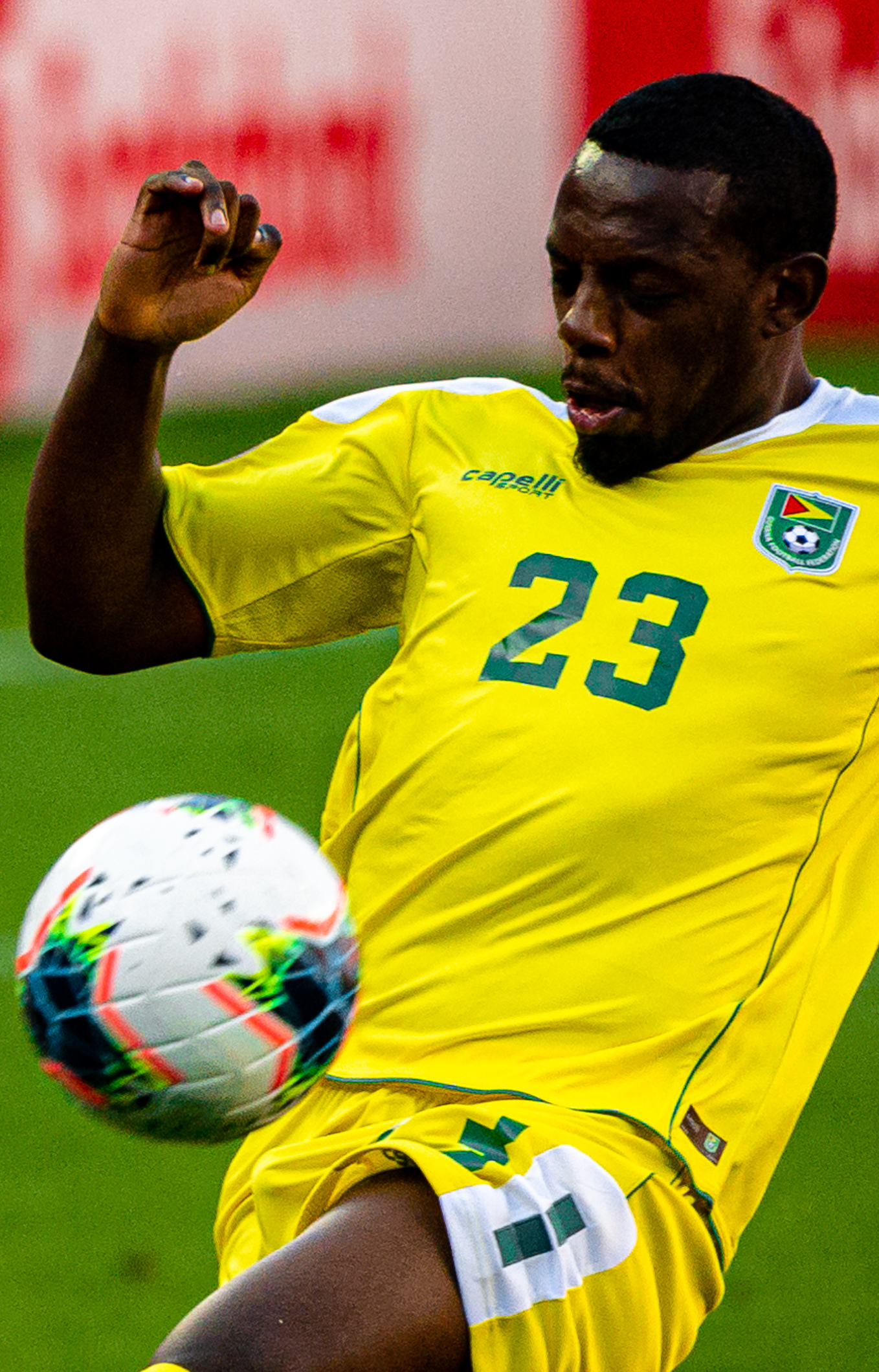
- Jeffrey with Guyana at the 2019 CONCACAF Gold Cup

Personal information
- Full name: Anthony Lamar Malcolm Jeffrey
- Date of birth: 3 October 1994 (age 32)
- Place of birth: Hendon, England
- Height: 1.76 m (5 ft 9 in)
- Position: Winger

Team information
- Current team: Dulwich Hamlet

Youth career
- 2003–2012: Arsenal

Senior career*
| Years | Team | Apps | (Gls) |
| 2012–2014 | Arsenal | 0 | (0) |
| 2013 | → Stevenage (loan) | 1 | (0) |
| 2013–2014 | → Boreham Wood (loan) | 7 | (5) |
| 2014 | Wycombe Wanderers | 11 | (0) |
| 2014 | Boreham Wood | 2 | (0) |
| 2015 | Welling United | 2 | (0) |
| 2015 | Concord Rangers | 1 | (0) |
| 2015 | → Boreham Wood (loan) | 11 | (1) |
| 2015–2016 | Boreham Wood | 2 | (0) |
| 2016–2017 | Forest Green Rovers | 5 | (0) |
| 2016 | → Boreham Wood (loan) | 7 | (0) |
| 2016–2017 | → Boreham Wood (loan) | 24 | (3) |
| 2017–2018 | Sutton United | 10 | (0) |
| 2017–2018 | → Dover Athletic (loan) | 21 | (1) |
| 2018–2019 | Dover Athletic | 33 | (3) |
| 2019–2020 | Dover Athletic | 14 | (0) |
| 2020–2021 | Wrexham | 8 | (0) |
| 2022–2023 | Billericay Town | 38 | (4) |
| 2023– | Dulwich Hamlet | 0 | (0) |

International career^{‡}
| 2019–2022 | Guyana | 7 | (0) |
- * Club domestic league appearances and goals as of 21:44, 20 January 2023 (UTC) ‡ National team caps and goals as of 23:11, 24 September 2021 (UTC)

Anthony Lamar Malcolm Jeffrey (born 3 October 1995) is a footballer who plays for Dulwich Hamlet. Born in England, he represents Guyana internationally.

== Career ==
=== Arsenal ===
Jeffrey began his career at Arsenal, joining the club's academy at the age of eight. He had attracted the interest of Chelsea and Liverpool, but opted to sign for the club he supported. He progressed through the various youth ranks, scoring 20 goals from midfield for the U16 side, before playing regularly at U18 level while still on schoolboy terms. Jeffrey continued to play for the U18 side as a first-year scholar during the 2011–12 campaign, scoring six times in 19 appearances. On his first full season of football at U18 level, Jeffrey stated—"I know what I put in on the training pitch will improve my game and help me get to my target of playing for the first-team. I have belief in my ability, but I know it will not just come to me". He remained a regular feature for the youth side during the following season, playing twelve times in the U18 league, as well as scoring two goals in three games in the FA Youth Cup. Jeffrey would also go on to make six further appearances in the NextGen Series, and also make his Arsenal U21 debut in a 0–0 draw against Blackburn Rovers in October 2012.

In March 2013, Jeffrey joined League One side Stevenage on loan for the remainder of the 2012–13 season. He made his professional debut in the club's 1–0 home defeat to Bournemouth on 12 March, coming on as an 81st-minute substitute.

On 3 December 2013, it was announced that he would join Boreham Wood on loan on a short-term deal until January 2014. He scored on his debut in a 3–2 win against Berkhamsted in the second round of the Herts Senior Cup. On 3 January 2014, it was announced that his loan spell was extended until 1 March 2014. On 22 January 2014, Jeffrey had his contract at Arsenal cancelled by mutual consent.

=== Later career ===
On 23 January 2014, Jeffrey signed for Wycombe Wanderers until the end of the 2013–14 season. He was released in May 2014.

He subsequently returned to Boreham Wood in December 2014. He then moved up a division to join Conference Premier outfit Welling United the following month in January 2015.

In the summer of 2015 he linked up with National League South side Concord Rangers. Only a few months later however, in October 2015, he returned to Boreham Wood, who had since been promoted into the National League, on loan. His loan move turned into a permanent move in December 2015 after he agreed a deal to stay at Boreham Wood until the end of the 2015–16 season. On 2 February 2016, it was announced that he had made a transfer deadline move to National League rivals Forest Green Rovers for an undisclosed fee. As part of the deal he was instantly loaned back to Boreham Wood. He made his Forest Green Rovers debut on 25 March 2016 in a 0–0 home draw against Aldershot Town. He would go on to appear in the 2016 National League play-off final for the club at Wembley Stadium, appearing as a substitute in a 3–1 defeat to Grimsby Town. On 15 July 2016, it was announced he had re-signed for Boreham Wood on a season long loan. He was released at the end of Forest Green Rovers' National League promotion winning season.

Sutton United announced the capture of his signature in July 2017, penning a one-year contract. On 16 November 2017 Jeffrey joined Dover Athletic on loan until the end of January 2018. He was released by Sutton United in June 2018, and brought back to Dover Athletic on a permanent 1-year deal in July 2018. The contract was not extended. However, after being a free agent for months, he returned to The Whites in their 2–0 defeat to Halifax Town on 2 October 2019.

On 10 September 2020, Jeffrey signed for National League side Wrexham following a successful trial. On 27 January 2021, it was confirmed that Jeffrey had left Wrexham following the expiry of his contract.

Jeffrey was without a club until February 2022, when he signed for National League South strugglers Billericay Town. However, he could not save the club from relegation to the Isthmian League Premier Division. Jeffrey returned for another season with the club in July 2022.

Following the expiry of his contract with Billericay Town, Jeffrey signed for Isthmian League Premier Division side Dulwich Hamlet ahead of the 2023–24 season.

== International career ==
Jeffrey was called up to the Guyana national football team in March 2019. He made his debut for Guyana on 23 March 2019 in a CONCACAF Nations League qualifier against Belize, as a starter. He was named to Guyana's squad for the 2019 CONCACAF Gold Cup on 30 May 2019.

== Style of play ==
Jeffrey can be deployed as either a winger or a striker. He is right-footed and has been described as a "pacy winger", as well as an "intelligent and quick" player. He was previously named as "one of the top three fastest boys in the country", and considers his pace to be one of his key attributes. During his time playing in Arsenal's youth team, he was used on the left wing—"testing opposition defenders with his searing pace".

== Career statistics ==
As of 27 April 2019.

Appearances and goals by club, season and competition
| Club | Season | League | | | FA Cup | | League Cup | | Other | | Total | |
| Club | Season | League | Apps | Goals | Apps | Goals | Apps | Goals | Apps | Goals | Apps | Goals |
|---|---|---|---|---|---|---|---|---|---|---|---|---|
| Arsenal | 2012–13 | Premier League | 0 | 0 | — | | — | | — | | 0 | 0 |
| Arsenal | 2013–14 | Premier League | 0 | 0 | — | | — | | — | | 0 | 0 |
| Total | | | 0 | 0 | — | | — | | — | | 0 | 0 |
| Stevenage (loan) | 2012–13 | League One | 1 | 0 | — | | — | | — | | 1 | 0 |
| Boreham Wood (loan) | 2013–14 | Conference South | 7 | 5 | — | | — | | — | | 7 | 5 |
| Wycombe Wanderers | 2013–14 | League Two | 11 | 0 | — | | — | | — | | 11 | 0 |
| Boreham Wood | 2014–15 | Conference South | 2 | 0 | — | | — | | — | | 2 | 0 |
| Welling United | 2014–15 | Conference Premier | 2 | 0 | — | | — | | — | | 2 | 0 |
| Concord Rangers | 2015–16 | National League South | 1 | 0 | — | | — | | — | | 1 | 0 |
| Boreham Wood (loan) | 2015–16 | National League | 11 | 1 | 2 | 0 | — | | 1 | 0 | 14 | 1 |
| Boreham Wood | 2015–16 | National League | 2 | 0 | — | | — | | — | | 2 | 0 |
| Forest Green Rovers | 2015–16 | National League | 5 | 0 | — | | — | | — | | 5 | 0 |
| Forest Green Rovers | 2016–17 | National League | 0 | 0 | — | | — | | — | | 0 | 0 |
| Total | | | 5 | 0 | — | | — | | — | | 5 | 0 |
| Boreham Wood (loan) | 2015–16 | National League | 7 | 0 | — | | — | | — | | 7 | 0 |
| Boreham Wood (loan) | 2016–17 | National League | 24 | 3 | 2 | 0 | — | | 6 | 3 | 32 | 6 |
| Sutton United | 2017–18 | National League | 10 | 0 | 1 | 0 | — | | — | | 11 | 0 |
| Dover Athletic (loan) | 2017–18 | National League | 21 | 1 | — | | — | | 3 | 0 | 24 | 1 |
| Dover Athletic | 2018–19 | National League | 33 | 3 | — | | — | | 3 | 1 | 36 | 4 |
| Career total | | | 127 | 8 | 5 | 0 | 0 | 0 | 13 | 4 | 145 | 12 |
