= 2015–16 Arsenal F.C. season =

English football club season

Arsenal
2015–16 season
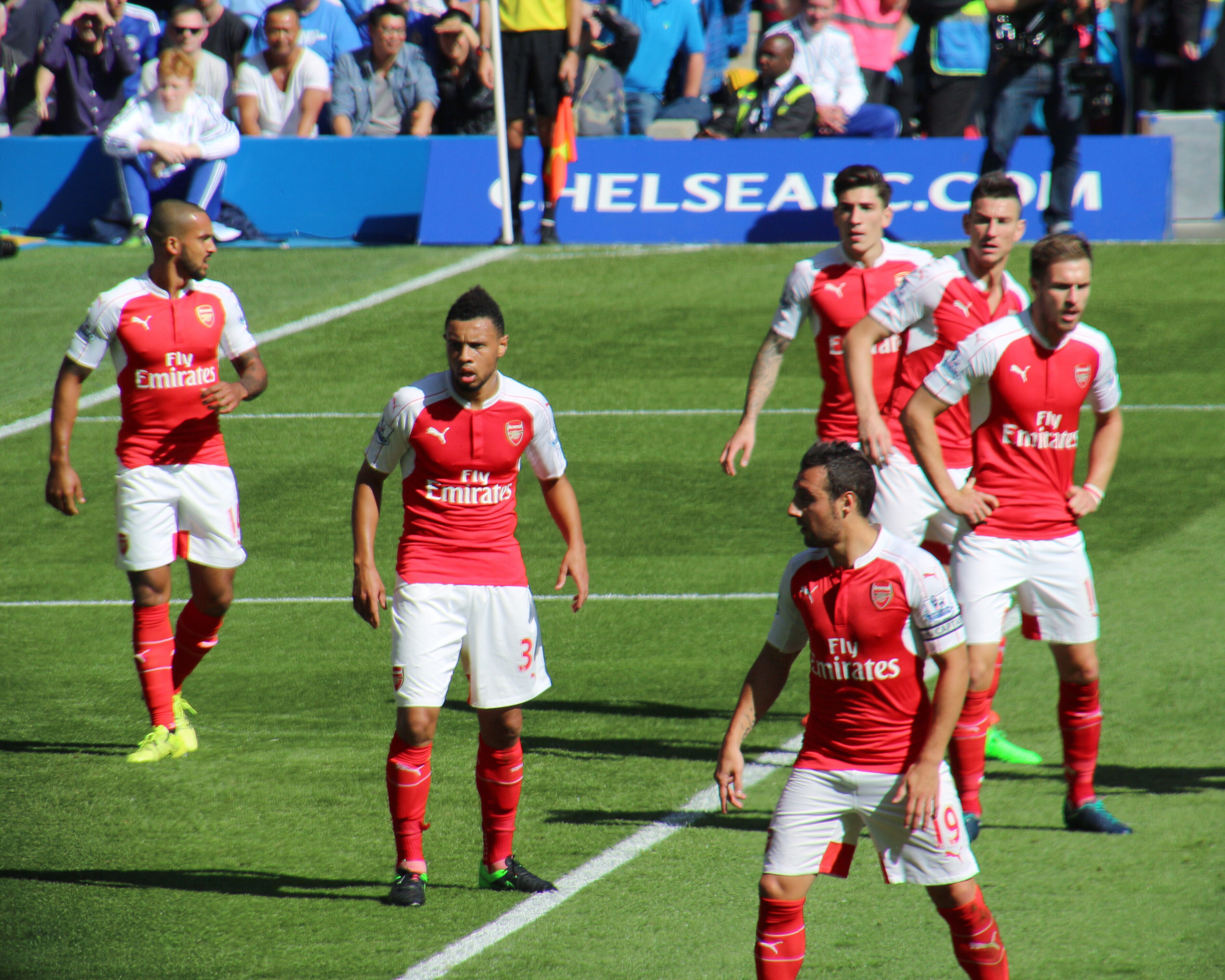
- Arsenal players during the derby match with Chelsea, September 2015
- Chairman: Sir Chips Keswick
- Manager: Arsène Wenger
- Stadium: Emirates Stadium
- Premier League: 2nd
- FA Cup: Sixth round
- League Cup: Fourth round
- FA Community Shield: Winners
- UEFA Champions League: Round of 16
- Top goalscorer: League: Olivier Giroud (16); All: Olivier Giroud (24)
Home colours	Away colours	Third colours

The 2015–16 season was Arsenal's 24th season in the Premier League and 90th consecutive season in the top flight of English football. The club entered the season as the FA Cup holders, and participated in the Premier League, FA Cup, League Cup, Community Shield and the UEFA Champions League. Arsenal were favourites to get their first league title since 2004, having been league-leaders towards the New Year, but a loss of form which included successive defeats to Manchester United and Swansea City saw them lose ground on eventual winners Leicester City, although they recovered to get 2nd, their highest finish in 11 years. Arsenal's attempt of winning a third consecutive FA Cup was unsuccessful, losing to Watford at the quarter-final stage, as well as exiting in the League Cup fourth round to Sheffield Wednesday. In Europe, Arsenal recovered from a poor start to qualify for the knockout-stages, but they were defeated in both legs against Barcelona. The season covers the period from 1 July 2015 to 30 June 2016.

== Review ==
=== August ===
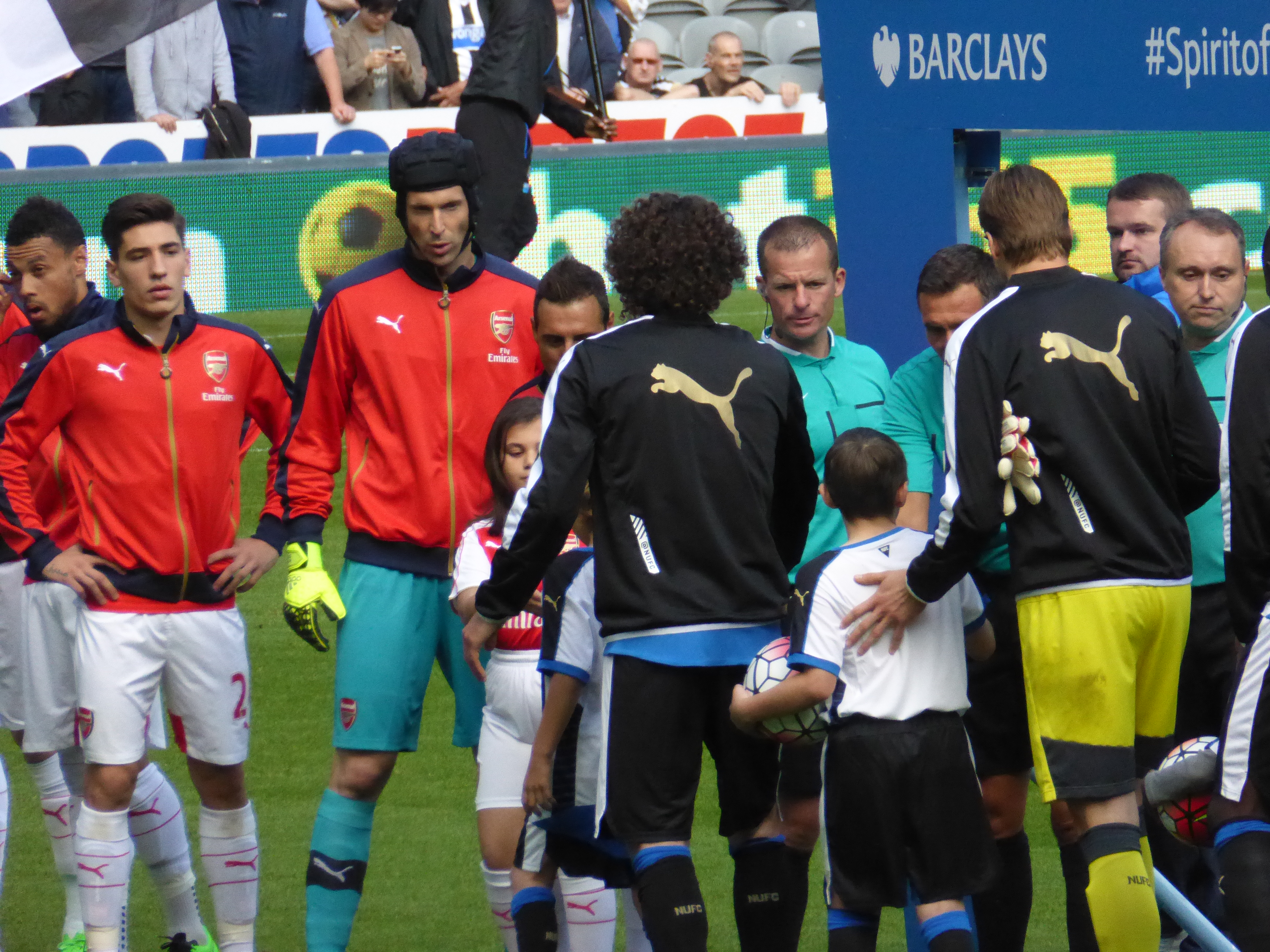
Pre-match handshakes before the victory at Newcastle United

Arsenal began their season with the Community Shield against local rival side Chelsea. The Gunners won the match 1–0, following a goal by Alex Oxlade-Chamberlain, who scored via a drive into the top corner. The trophy was Arsène Wenger's 15th in 18 years of being in charge of Arsenal, and presented Wenger with his first win against a side managed by José Mourinho after 13 attempts. Soon after, Arsenal began their 24th Premier League season at home to West Ham United, and inspired by the signing of goalkeeper Petr Čech, many believed Arsenal to be title contenders for the first time in 11 years. The club's solid pre-season form, however, fizzled out as they failed to win in their first two home games, with a 2–0 defeat to West Ham on the opening weekend, leaving them third-bottom, and a goalless draw with Liverpool, although Aaron Ramsey was falsely ruled offside for an early goal. With two tight wins at Crystal Palace and Newcastle United, Arsenal went into September with seven points. Arsenal did not make additional signings after Čech, leaving manager Wenger to come under fire from fans and critics.

=== September ===
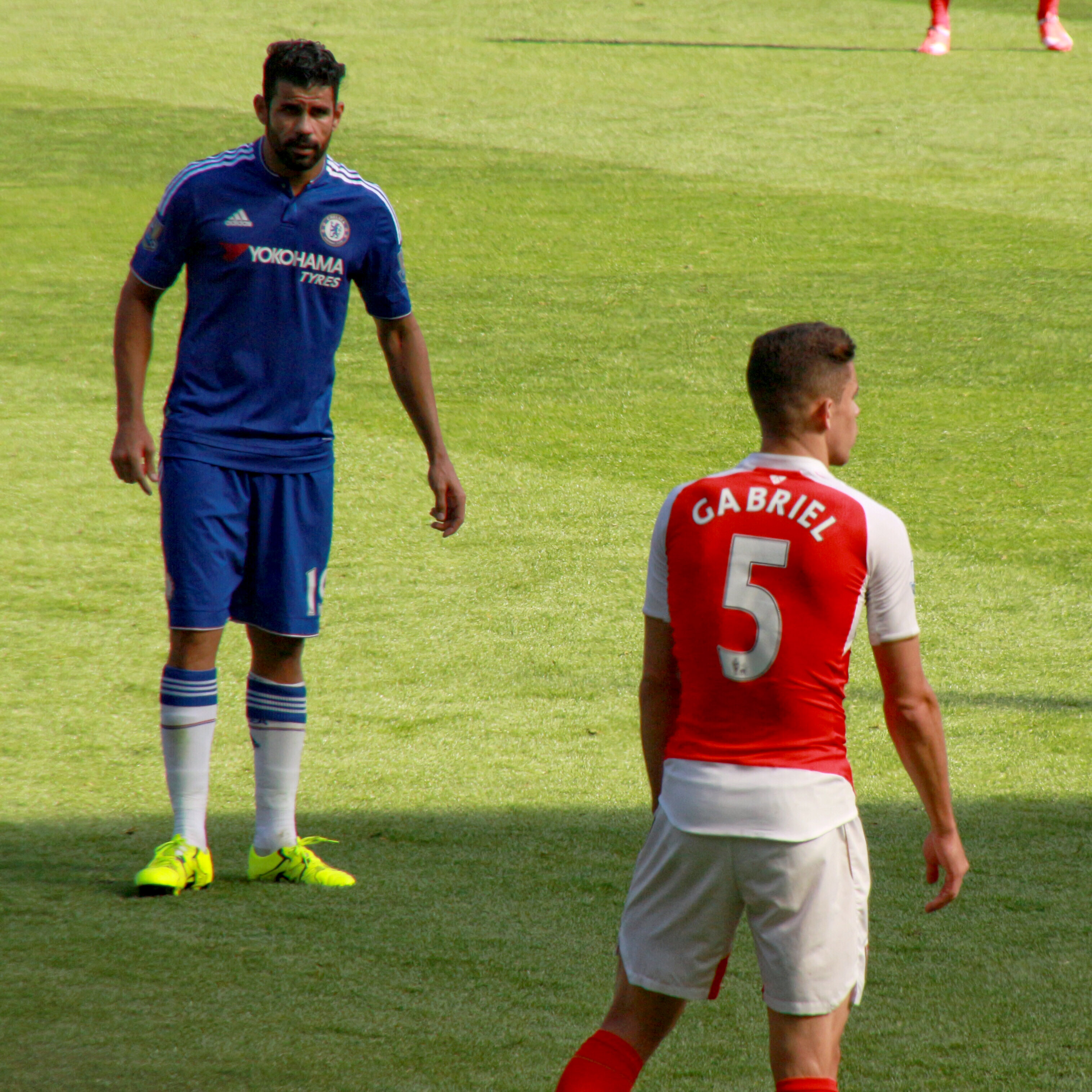
Chelsea's Diego Costa eyeballs Gabriel. The latter would be the recipient of a red card later rescinded, while the former was charged with violent conduct.

Arsenal started September with a nervy 2–0 win over Stoke City at the Emirates, with Theo Walcott and Olivier Giroud scoring. Between the Stoke clash and a trip to struggling champions Chelsea, Arsenal faced Dinamo Zagreb away in the Champions League. Despite appearing the stronger side, Arsenal slumped to a shock 2–1 defeat, with under-performing striker Giroud being sent off for two yellow cards. The week got worse as Arsenal lost 2–0 at Stamford Bridge, with Santi Cazorla (two yellows) and Gabriel being sent off, the latter incorrectly shown red by Mike Dean for a clash with Diego Costa in which the latter assaulted Laurent Koscielny. Gabriel's ban was reduced from three games to one, but Gabriel, Costa, Chelsea and Arsenal were all fined for player misconduct, with Costa suspended for three games. With the Chelsea incident resolved, Arsenal faced a tough League Cup tie with North London arch-rival club Tottenham Hotspur at White Hart Lane. Mathieu Flamini became an unsung hero with a brace, the second of which was a volley from 20 yards, both goals on the other side of a Calum Chambers own goal. Arsenal, full of confidence after eliminating their rivals, visited the only unbeaten team in the league at the time, Leicester City, who were one point and one place above Arsenal. Despite a brace from Jamie Vardy, Walcott and Giroud scored either side of three goals from Sánchez, who ended a run of seven games without a goal. Arsenal ended their month on a sour note, however, as errors from second-choice goalkeeper David Ospina saw Arsenal lose 3–2 to Olympiacos at home in the Champions League, meaning they were bottom of their group with successive games against in-form Bayern Munich coming up.

=== October ===
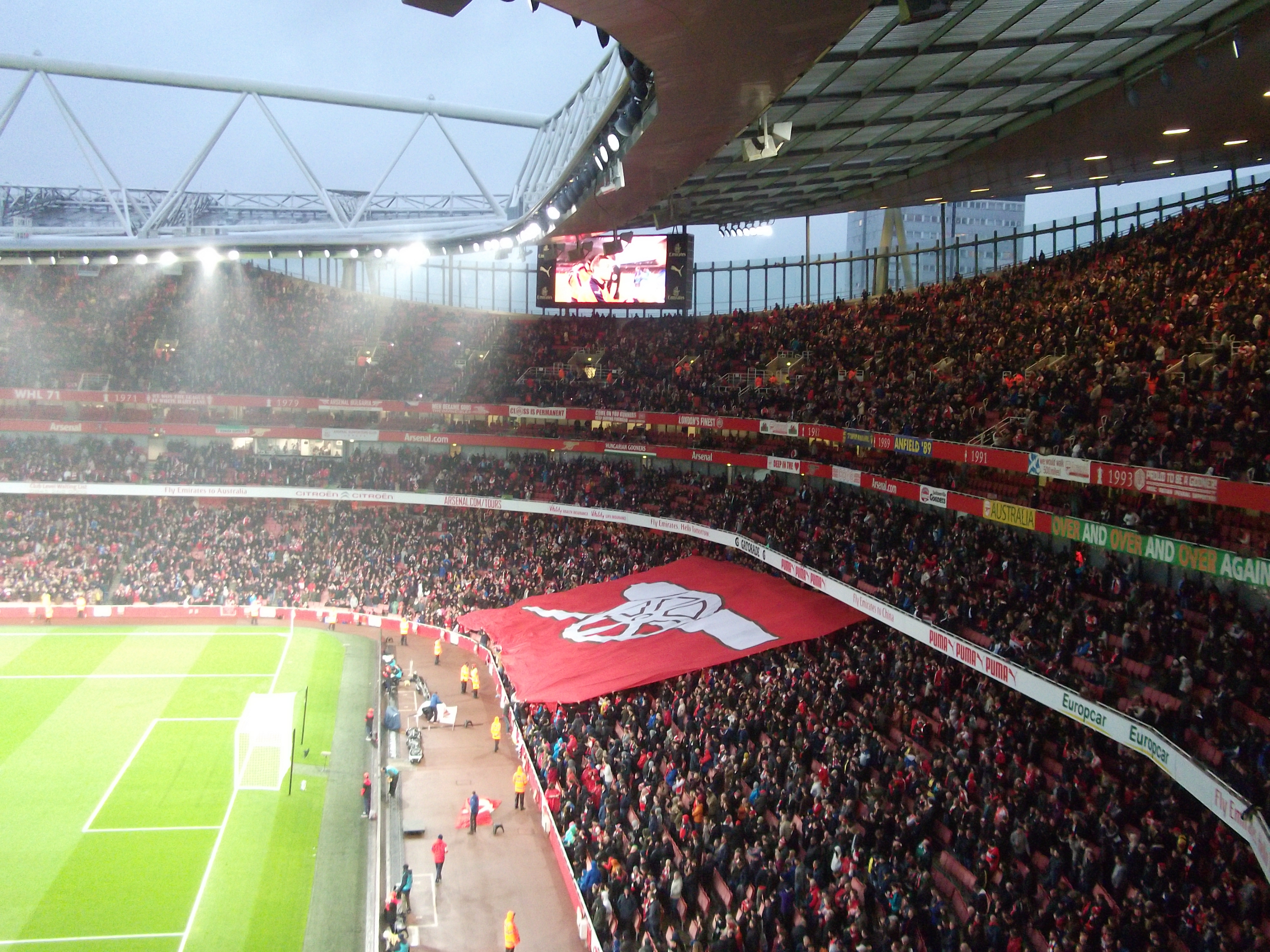
Arsenal fans inside the Emirates Stadium before the Everton match

Arsenal started October on a high, as three early goals—two from Alexis Sánchez and one from Mesut Özil—at the Emirates saw Arsenal breeze past Manchester United to leapfrog them into second place in the league table, behind Manchester City. Arsenal travelled to Vicarage Road two weeks later to play Watford, where goals from Sánchez, Aaron Ramsey and Olivier Giroud saw Arsenal claim another 3–0 win. Arsenal hosted German heavyweights Bayern Munich in an attempt to turn around their Champions League. Despite the German team losing only once all season, Arsenal claimed a shock 2–0 win, with Giroud and Özil scoring late in the second half. Giroud's return to form saw him return to the starting lineup ahead of Theo Walcott. Giroud thanked Wenger by inspiring the Gunners to a 2–1 win over Everton at the Emirates. Arsenal's only loss in October came between the Everton win and a 3–0 victory over Swansea City, courtesy of goals from Giroud, Laurent Koscielny and Joel Campbell, when they were stunned by Championship side Sheffield Wednesday, going out of the League Cup in a 3–0 defeat that saw Theo Walcott and Alex Oxlade-Chamberlain off injured, with goals from Ross Wallace, Lucas João and Sam Hutchinson.

=== November ===
Arsenal were humiliated at the Allianz Arena to start November, with Bayern Munich cruising to a 5–1 win, putting Arsenal's Champions League progression in doubt. Arsenal hosted rivals Tottenham on the Sunday that followed, but with stars Héctor Bellerín, Theo Walcott, Aaron Ramsey and Alex Oxlade-Chamberlain on a list of ten injured Arsenal players, the Gunners had to struggle for a 1–1 draw. November only got worse for Arsenal, with Francis Coquelin looking at three months out, Mikel Arteta facing several weeks out after both were injured in a 2–1 defeat at West Bromwich Albion, with Santi Cazorla missing a vital penalty late on. Arsenal's Champions League form bounced back, with an Alexis Sánchez brace giving Arsenal a 3–0 win over Dinamo Zagreb at the Emirates. With Olympiacos thrashed by Bayern, Arsenal would need a two-goal cushion or a 3–2 or higher victory in Athens to progress. Arsenal's horrid month ended with more misery, with Sánchez and Cazorla both suffering injuries in a 1–1 draw with Norwich City, with Cazorla's keeping him out for three months. Oxlade-Chamberlain, Ramsey and Walcott, however, all returned at the end of the month, with the crucial Olympiacos game and a match with Premier League title contenders Manchester City coming up.

=== December ===
Arsenal returned to form in December, starting with a 3–1 win over Sunderland, with Joel Campbell and Aaron Ramsey scoring either side of goals at either end from Olivier Giroud. Arsenal then traveled to Olympiacos, where they had failed to win in their last three games, with their last win in Greece coming in 1998. Fears were erased by a Giroud hat-trick, putting Arsenal through and demoting Olympiacos into the Europa League, only for Arsenal to draw holders Barcelona, who had knocked Arsenal out in the 2010 quarter finals and in 2011 at the same stage. The Spanish side also beat the Gunners in the 2006 final. Arsenal recorded successive victories before Christmas, winning 2–0 at Aston Villa, before a 2–1 home win over Manchester City. As things were looking up, a Boxing Day defeat at Liverpool saw surprise leaders Leicester loosen their grip on first, giving Arsenal a chance to go top with a win against Southampton, but a Shane Long brace saw Arsenal thrashed 4–0. Despite this, Arsenal still finished 2015 top of the Premier League, after a 2–0 win against AFC Bournemouth was enough to keep Arsenal ahead of Leicester on goal difference, who drew 0–0 with Manchester City in their final game of 2015.

=== January ===
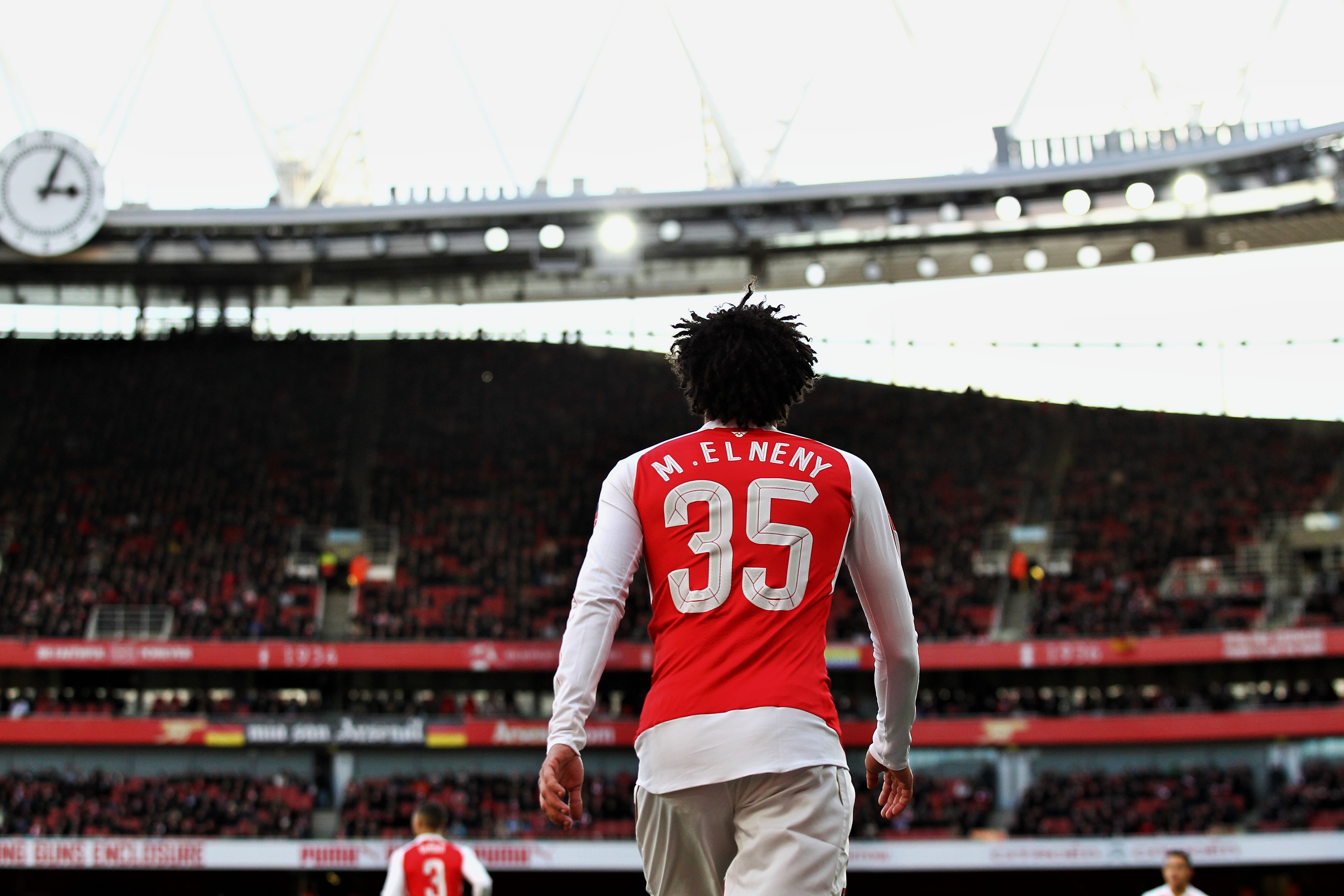
Mohamed Elneny looks up at the new Clock End during his AFC début: an FA Cup-tie at home to Burnley.

Arsenal started 2016 with an unconvincing 1–0 win over relegation scrappers Newcastle, courtesy of a late Laurent Koscielny goal. Arsenal kicked off their FA Cup defence against Sunderland at the Emirates. Their 3–1 win mirrored the clash in December, with Joel Campbell, Olivier Giroud and Aaron Ramsey scoring Arsenal's goals in identical fashion to the league tie, despite an early Jeremain Lens goal. This was followed by two away league fixtures at Liverpool and Stoke; the former was a 3–3 draw with Giroud scoring a brace and Ramsey finding the net for Arsenal, whereas the latter finished scoreless. On 24 January, Arsenal hosted local rivals Chelsea and were defeated 1–0 after Per Mertesacker was sent off. This meant they had failed to win a league game against Chelsea for the ninth league meeting in a row, and it was the sixth consecutive time they had failed to score in the fixture. Six days later, Arsenal advanced to the fifth round of the FA Cup, with Calum Chambers and Alexis Sánchez scoring in a 2–1 defeat of Championship side Burnley at home. Arsenal made one signing in January, Basel's Egyptian midfielder Mohamed Elneny completed a £5 million move.

=== February ===
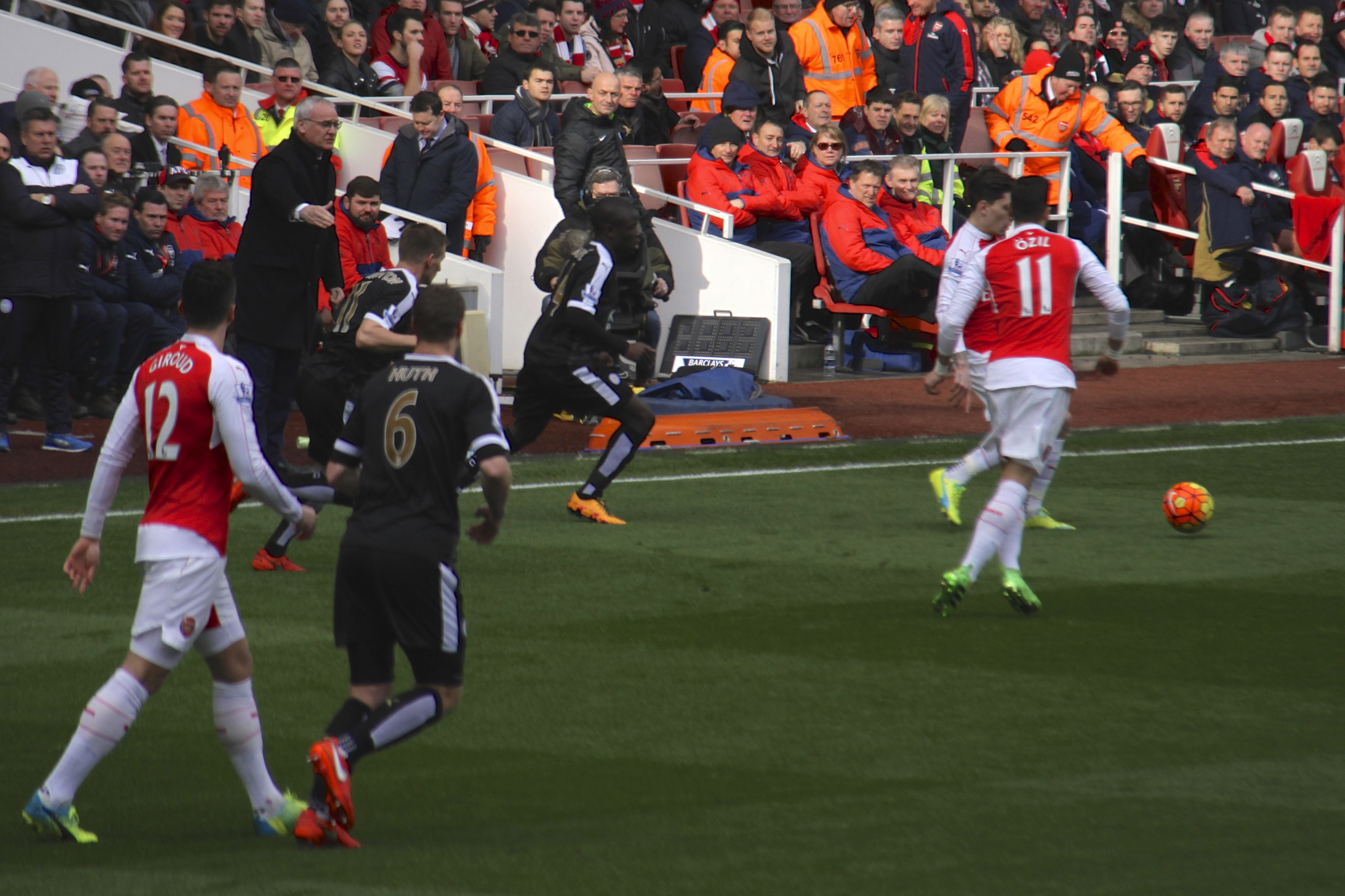
The Arsenal hug the touchline on St Valentine's Day, in front of Leicester City manager Claudio Ranieri.

In the beginning of February, Arsenal failed to score for the third consecutive league match, playing Southampton to a stalemate at the Emirates. Mesut Özil and Alex Oxlade-Chamberlain led Arsenal back to winning ways with a 2–0 away victory at AFC Bournemouth. Arsenal then won a dramatic top of the table clash with league leaders Leicester, coming back after a Jamie Vardy penalty to win 2–1 at home, with late goals from Theo Walcott and Danny Welbeck, reducing the gap between Arsenal and Leicester in second and first to two points. Despite a dominant performance at home, Arsenal were held to a 0–0 draw by Hull City in the fifth round of the FA Cup. Arsenal subsequently returned to Champions League action by hosting title holders Barcelona. A Lionel Messi brace condemned Arsenal to a 2–0 defeat. Arsenal ended February with an away game at Manchester United, with goals from Welbeck and Özil not enough to avoid a 3–2 defeat.

=== March ===
Arsenal started March suffering a third consecutive loss at the hands of Swansea at home; Joel Campbell's goal was cancelled out and the match finished 2–1 to Swansea. Arsenal then visited local rivals Tottenham in a make-or-break clash, as defeat would put Arsenal six points off their rivals, above Arsenal in second. Aaron Ramsey gave Arsenal a crucial lead, but a Francis Coquelin sending off for two yellow cards turned the game on its head. Toby Alderweireld and Harry Kane struck back to put Spurs ahead, but Alexis Sánchez helped the team rescue a point with a late goal, with the match finishing 2–2. Olivier Giroud and Theo Walcott scored two goals each against Hull City in the FA Cup fifth round replay to reach the quarter finals, but Arsenal went out after a 2–1 home defeat to Watford, with Danny Welbeck scoring the lone goal for the team as Arsenal's defence ended, after winning the previous two titles. Arsenal went out of their second cup competition just days later, being condemned to a sixth-straight last-16 elimination from the Champions League with a 3–1 away loss to Barcelona, Mohamed Elneny's first Arsenal goal proving a mere consolation. One promising note from the defeat was the performance of Nigerian youngster Alex Iwobi, and he was rewarded with his second Premier League start against Everton at the end of March. His first club goal, and a fourth goal in nine games since return for Danny Welbeck, saw Arsenal win 2–0.

=== April ===
Arsenal got off to a flying start in the penultimate month of the season; goals from Alexis Sánchez, Héctor Bellerín and Theo Walcott, as well as a second Premier League goal on a second start for Alex Iwobi, saw Arsenal crush Watford 4–0 at Emirates Stadium. The result kept Arsenal firmly in the title race ahead of a crucial clash at sixth-placed West Ham the following weekend, having lost the reverse tie on opening day. The result saw praise for Iwobi, who was referred to as "the next Ian Wright" by Garth Crooks. Arsenal visited West Ham the following matchday, where they blew away a 2–0 lead to draw 3–3. Sánchez, Özil and Koscielny scored. Arsenal's title hopes suffered a big blow when they were held 1–1 at home by Crystal Palace despite dominating the match, with Sánchez scoring for the team. Arsenal hosted and defeated West Brom 2–0, courtesy of a brace from Sánchez. Arsenal's chances of ending a 12-year Premier League title drought became mathematically impossible after a 0–0 away draw at Sunderland, which left them 12 points behind leaders Leicester with only three matches to play. Arsenal ended April with a 1–0 win over Norwich at Emirates Stadium, with Danny Welbeck scoring the solitary goal.

=== May ===
After Manchester City were defeated by Southampton, Arsenal stayed in third ahead of a clash with fourth placed City. Arsenal came from behind twice to recover a 2–2 draw. Olivier Giroud ended a 15-game goal drought dating back to January with the first, while Alexis Sánchez added his seventh goal in nine games for Arsenal's second. The draw failed to secure Champions League football for 2016–17, but after Manchester United lost 3–2 to West Ham two days later secured at least a place in the qualification round. Arsenal needed a point against Aston Villa to secure automatic qualification and third place. Arsenal would have to hope a win and a shock victory by already-relegated Newcastle against Tottenham for Arsenal to pip their rivals to second. Newcastle did the impossible with a 5–1 rout of Spurs, and an Olivier Giroud hat-trick powered Arsenal to a 4–0 win over Villa. Captain Mikel Arteta, who came on as a substitute in what was his final appearance before retirement, forced an own goal by shooting in off the bar and Villa goalkeeper Mark Bunn. Arteta was given a standing ovation, while second-longest-serving player Tomáš Rosický received a guard of honour, with the club confirming both would leave at the expiration of their contracts.

== Players ==
=== Squad information ===
N	Pos.	Nat.	Name	Age	EU	Since	App	Goals	Ends	Transfer fee	Notes
1	GK	(Poland)	Wojciech Szczęsny	26	EU	2009	181	0	undisclosed	Youth system	On loan to Roma
2	DF	(France)	Mathieu Debuchy	30	EU	2014	22	1	undisclosed	£12.0M	On loan to Bordeaux
3	DF	(England)	Kieran Gibbs	26	EU	2007	209	6	undisclosed	Youth system	
4	DF	(Germany)	Per Mertesacker	31	EU	2011	208	8	undisclosed	£8.0M	
5	DF	(Brazil)	Gabriel Paulista	25	Non-EU	2015 (Winter)	38	1	undisclosed	£11.3M	
6	DF	(France)	Laurent Koscielny	30	EU	2010	248	20	undisclosed	£8.5M	
7	MF	(Czech Republic)	Tomáš Rosický	35	EU	2006	246	28	undisclosed	£6.8M	
8	MF	(Spain)	Mikel Arteta	34	EU	2011	150	16	2016	£10.0M	
10	MF	(England)	Jack Wilshere	24	EU	2008	157	12	2018	Youth system	
11	MF	(Germany)	Mesut Özil	27	EU	2013	118	20	undisclosed	£42.5M	
12	FW	(France)	Olivier Giroud	29	EU	2012	188	82	undisclosed	£12.8M	
13	GK	(Colombia)	David Ospina	27	Non-EU	2014	36	0	undisclosed	£3.2M	
14	FW	(England)	Theo Walcott	27	EU	2006 (Winter)	344	85	2019	£9.0M	
15	MF	(England)	Alex Oxlade-Chamberlain	22	EU	2011	149	14	undisclosed	£12.0M	
16	MF	(Wales)	Aaron Ramsey	25	EU	2008	265	43	undisclosed	£4.8M	
17	FW	(Chile)	Alexis Sánchez	27	Non-EU	2014	94	42	undisclosed	£30.0M	
18	DF	(Spain)	Nacho Monreal	30	EU	2013 (Winter)	131	2	undisclosed	£8.5M	
19	MF	(Spain)	Santi Cazorla	31	EU	2012	169	27	undisclosed	£12.0M	
20	MF	(France)	Mathieu Flamini	32	EU	2013	246	13	undisclosed	Free	
21	DF	(England)	Calum Chambers	21	EU	2014	59	2	undisclosed	£16.0m	
22	FW	(France)	Yaya Sanogo	23	EU	2013	20	1	undisclosed	Free	On loan to Charlton Athletic
23	FW	(England)	Danny Welbeck	25	EU	2014	49	13	2019	£16.0M	
24	DF	(Spain)	Héctor Bellerín	21	EU	2013	73	3	undisclosed	Youth system	
25	DF	(England)	Carl Jenkinson	24	EU	2011	57	1	undisclosed	£1.0M	On loan to West Ham United
26	GK	(Argentina)	Emiliano Martínez	23	Non-EU	2012	8	0	undisclosed	Youth system	On loan to Wolverhampton Wanderers
27	FW	(Germany)	Serge Gnabry	20	EU	2012	19	1	undisclosed	Youth system	On loan to West Bromwich Albion
28	FW	(Costa Rica)	Joel Campbell	23	Non-EU	2011	41	4	undisclosed	£0.9M	
32	FW	(England)	Chuba Akpom	20	EU	2013	9	0	undisclosed	Youth system	On loan to Hull City
33	GK	(Czech Republic)	Petr Čech	33	EU	2015	42	0	2019	£10M	
34	MF	(France)	Francis Coquelin	25	EU	2008	109	0	undisclosed	Youth system	
35	MF	(Egypt)	Mohamed Elneny	23	Non-EU	2016 (Winter)	17	1	undisclosed	£7.4M	
37	MF	(Poland)	Krystian Bielik	18	EU	2015 (Winter)	1	0	undisclosed	£2.5M	
42	DF	(England)	Isaac Hayden	21	EU	2013	2	0	undisclosed	Youth system	On loan to Hull City
45	FW	(Nigeria)	Alex Iwobi	20	EU	2015	21	2	undisclosed	Youth system	
–	MF	(United States)	Gedion Zelalem	19	EU	2014	2	0	undisclosed	Youth system	On loan to Rangers

- Last updated: 15 May 2016
- Source: Arsenal F.C. and footballdatabase.com (for EU passport, country as international player, contract ending and transfer fee)
- Ordered by squad number.

=== Transfers ===
==== Transfers in ====
#	Position	Player	Transferred from	Fee	Date	Team	Source
54	MF	(France) Jeff Reine-Adélaïde	(France) Lens	Undisclosed (~ £3,000,000)	21 May 2015	Reserves	
68	FW	(France) Yassin Fortune	(France) Lens	Undisclosed (~ £3,000,000)	21 May 2015	Academy	
66	MF	(Romania) Vlad Dragomir	(Romania) Poli Timișoara	Undisclosed (~ £71,000)	24 June 2015	Academy	
72	DF	(Ghana) Jordi Osei-Tutu	(England) Reading	Undisclosed (~ £0)	26 June 2015	Academy	
33	GK	(Czech Republic) Petr Čech	(England) Chelsea	Undisclosed (~ £10,000,000)	29 June 2015	First team	
—	FW	(Netherlands) Donyell Malen	(Netherlands) Ajax	Free transfer	29 July 2015	Academy	
36	MF	(France) Ismaël Bennacer	(France) Arles-Avignon	Undisclosed (~ £150,000)	30 July 2015	Reserves	
35	MF	(Egypt) Mohamed Elneny	(Switzerland) Basel	Undisclosed (~ £7,400,000)	14 January 2016	First team	

Total spending: ▼ Undisclosed (~ £21,521,000)

==== Transfers out ====
#	Position	Player	Transferred to	Fee	Date	Team	Source
24	MF	(France) Abou Diaby	(France) Marseille (Note: Following Diaby's release on 10 June 2015, he later signed for Marseille on 29 July 2015.)	Free transfer (Released)	10 June 2015	First team	
31	MF	(Japan) Ryo Miyaichi	(Germany) FC St. Pauli (Note: Following Miyaichi's release on 10 June 2015, he later signed for St. Pauli on 18 June 2015.)	Free transfer (Released)	10 June 2015	Reserves	
37	DF	(Nigeria) Semi Ajayi	(Wales) Cardiff City (Note: Following Ajayi's release on 10 June 2015, he later signed for Cardiff City on 18 June 2015.)	Free transfer (Released)	10 June 2015	Reserves	
46	MF	(England) Jack Jebb	(England) Stevenage (Note: Following Jebb's release on 10 June 2015, he later signed for Stevenage on 1 September 2015.)	Free transfer (Released)	10 June 2015	Reserves	
48	FW	(England) Austin Lipman	(England) VCD Athletic (Note: Following Lipmans' release on 30 June 2015, he later signed for VCD Athletic on 31 July 2015.)	Free transfer (Released)	10 June 2015	Reserves	
54	DF	(England) Brandon Ormonde-Ottewill	(England) Swindon Town (Note: Following Ormonde-Ottewill's release on 10 June 2015, he later signed for Swindon Town on 2 July 2015.)	Free transfer (Released)	10 June 2015	Reserves	
57	GK	(England) Josh Vickers	(Wales) Swansea City (Note: Following Vickers' release on 10 June 2015, he later signed for Swansea City on 12 August 2015.)	Free transfer (Released)	10 June 2015	Reserves	
9	FW	(Germany) Lukas Podolski	(Turkey) Galatasaray (Note: The fee may eventually rise over £10 million subject to player performances and contract commitments.)	Undisclosed (~ £1,800,000)	4 July 2015	First team	
64	DF	(England) George Dobson	(England) West Ham United	Undisclosed	27 July 2015	Reserves	
—	MF	(Portugal) Jonatas Centeno	(England) Sheffield Wednesday	Free transfer (Released)	4 August 2015	Reserves	

Total incoming: ▲ Undisclosed (~ £1,800,000)

==== Loans out ====
#	Position	Player	Loaned to	Date	Loan expires	Team	Source
70	MF	(England) Ainsley Maitland-Niles	(England) Ipswich Town	2 July 2015	End of season	Reserves	
25	DF	(England) Carl Jenkinson	(England) West Ham United	14 July 2015	End of season	First team	
22	FW	(France) Yaya Sanogo	(Netherlands) Ajax	17 July 2015	1 February 2016 (Note: Loan initially until the end of the season)	First team	
1	GK	(Poland) Wojciech Szczęsny	(Italy) Roma	29 July 2015	End of season	First team	
57	MF	(Spain) Jon Toral	(England) Birmingham City	30 July 2015	End of season	Reserves	
38	MF	(England) Daniel Crowley	(England) Barnsley	31 July 2015	30 October 2015 (Note: Loan initially until 3 January 2016)	Reserves	
41	DF	(England) Isaac Hayden	(England) Hull City	31 July 2015	End of season	First team	
32	FW	(England) Chuba Akpom	(England) Hull City	4 August 2015	End of season	First team	
27	FW	(Germany) Serge Gnabry	(England) West Bromwich Albion	7 August 2015	5 January 2016 (Note: Loan initially until the end of the season)	First team	
26	GK	(Argentina) Emiliano Martínez	(England) Wolverhampton Wanderers	11 August 2015	End of season	First team	
58	FW	(Brazil) Wellington Silva	(England) Bolton Wanderers	20 August 2015	End of season	Reserves	
35	MF	(United States) Gedion Zelalem	(Scotland) Rangers	24 August 2015	End of Season	Reserves	
47	MF	(Finland) Glen Kamara	(England) Southend	22 January 2016	End of Season	Reserves	
2	DF	(France) Mathieu Debuchy	(France) Bordeaux	1 February 2016	End of Season	First team	
22	FW	(France) Yaya Sanogo	(England) Charlton Athletic	1 February 2016	End of Season	First team	

==== Overall transfer activity ====
Spending

Summer: ▼ Undisclosed (~ £14,121,000)

Winter: ▼ Undisclosed (~ £7,400,000)

Total: ▼ Undisclosed (~ £21,521,000)

Income

Summer: ▲ Undisclosed (~ £1,800,000)

Winter: ▲ Undisclosed (~ £0,000,000)

Total: ▲ Undisclosed (~ £1,800,000)

Net expenditure

Summer: ▼ Undisclosed (~ £13,321,000)

Winter: ▼ Undisclosed (~ £7,400,000)

Total: ▼ Undisclosed (~ £20,721,000)

== Club ==
=== Coaching staff ===
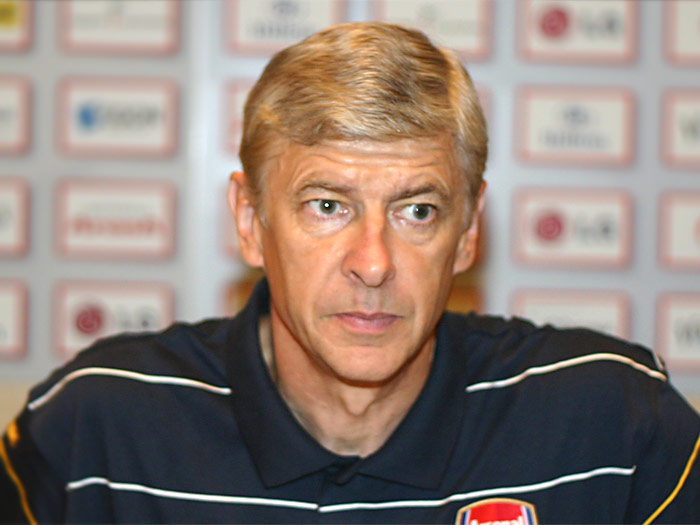
This is Arsène Wenger's 20th season with Arsenal.

Position	Staff
Manager	(France) Arsène Wenger
Assistant manager	(England) Steve Bould
First team coach	(Bosnia and Herzegovina) Boro Primorac (England) Neil Banfield
Goalkeeping coach	(Republic of Ireland) Gerry Peyton
Head of athletic performance enhancement	(United States) Shad Forsythe
Fitness coach	(England) Tony Colbert (England) Craig Gant
Physiotherapist	(England) Colin Lewin (England) Ben Ashworth (England) Andrew Rolls
Club doctor	(Republic of Ireland) Gary O'Driscoll
Head of academy	(Netherlands) Andries Jonker
Masseur	(England) Darren Page (England) Chris Harvey (England) Chris Senior
Kit manager	(England) Vic Akers
Assistant Kit manager	(England) Paul Akers
Equipment manager	(England) Paul Johnson
Performance nutritionist	(England) James Collins
Football analyst	(England) Ben Knapper

Last updated: 1 July 2015
Source: Arsenal F.C.

=== Kit ===
Supplier: Puma / Sponsor: Fly Emirates

Home	Home alt.	Away	Away alt.	Third	Third alt.	Goalkeeper 1	Goalkeeper 2	Goalkeeper 3

=== Kit information ===
This is Puma's second year supplying Arsenal kit, having taken over from Nike at the beginning of the 2014–15 season.

- Home: The home kit features Arsenal's traditional colours of red and white. The kit features red trim on the sleeves and a grandad collar. Additionally, golden trim features on the kit for the first time since 2006–07. The traditional white socks are returned to the kit after the club played in hooped socks last season.
- Away: The away kit features the colours gold and navy, and is similar to the away kit worn in the Double-winning 2001–02 season. The shirt has navy shoulders and a crew-neck, but the most striking feature of the kit is the subtle diamond graphic on the body of the shirt. The strip is combined with navy shorts and socks.
- Third: The third kit, which is set to be used in cup competitions, is mainly anthracite with white, gold and 'Capri Breeze' (turquoise) diagonal sashes. The kit features a monochromatic golden Arsenal badge and is combined with anthracite shorts and socks. Turquoise shorts and socks were worn in the match against Sheffield Wednesday.
- Keeper: The goalkeeper kits are based in Puma new goalkeeper template utilised by the supplier's top clubs, which feature contrasting hoops on the top half of the body. The first-choice strip is dark grey with golden hoops and a lighter grey stripe on the sleeves, while the second-choice strip is aqua with black hoops and golden detailing. The alternative strip is orange and also features black hoops.

=== Other information ===
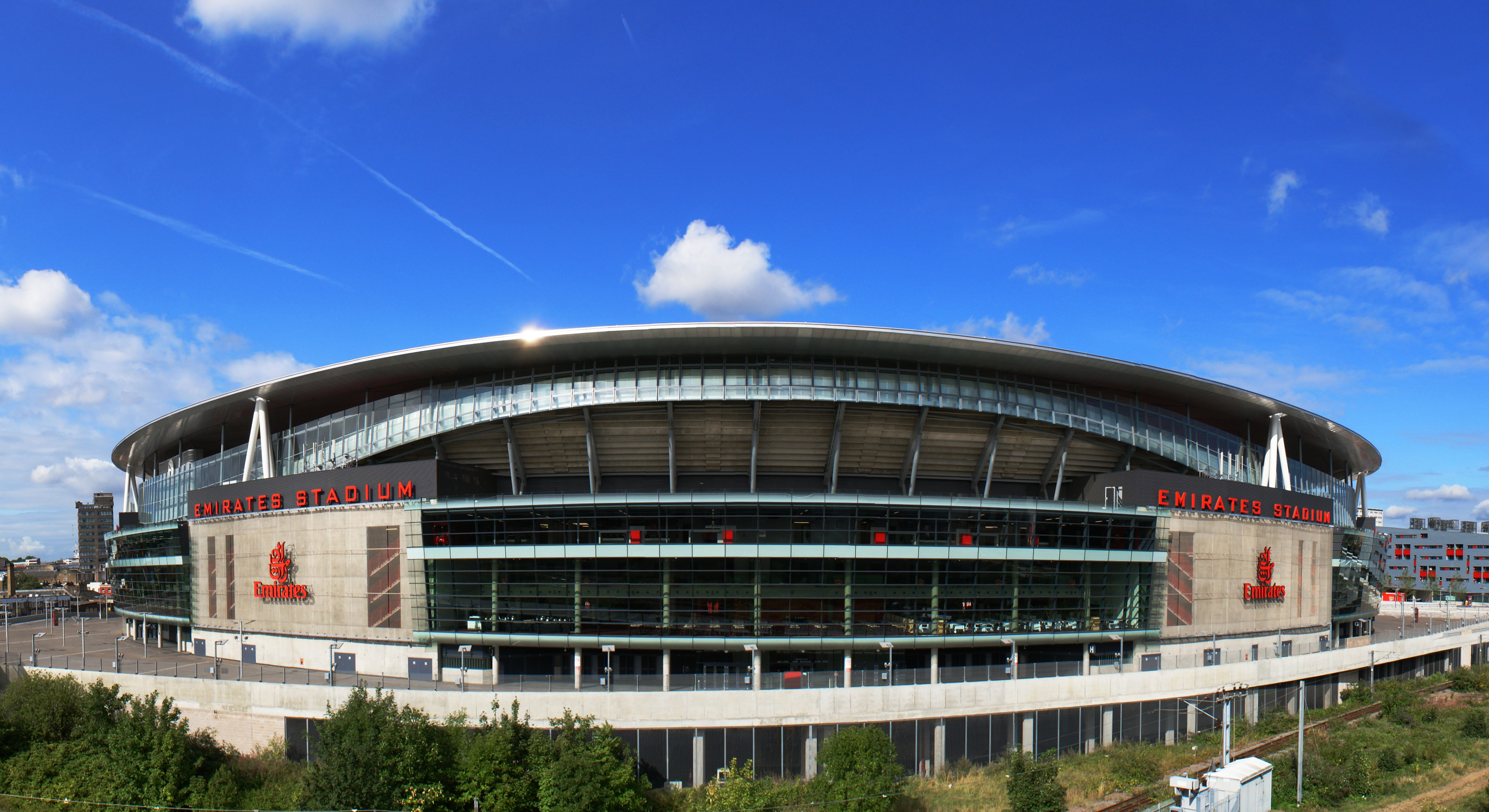
The Emirates Stadium is the second largest stadium in the Premier League.

Chairman	(England) Stan Kroenke
Ground (capacity and dimensions)	Emirates Stadium (60,355 / 113x76 metres)

Updated to match played 30 May 2014
Source: Arsenal F.C.

== Squad statistics ==
=== Appearances and goals ===
As of 15 May 2016

Numbers in parentheses denote appearances as substitute. Players with number struck through and marked † left the club during the playing season.

No.	Pos.	Nat.	Name	Premier League		FA Cup		League Cup		Champions League		Community Shield		Total	
No.	Pos.	Nat.	Name	Apps	Goals	Apps	Goals	Apps	Goals	Apps	Goals	Apps	Goals	Apps	Goals
2	DF	FRA	Mathieu Debuchy	2	0	0	0	2	0	2 (1)	0	0	0	6 (1)	0
3	DF	ENG	Kieran Gibbs	3 (12)	1	5	0	2	0	2 (3)	0	0 (1)	0	12 (16)	1
4	DF	GER	Per Mertesacker	24	0	3	0	2	0	5 (1)	0	1	0	35 (1)	0
5	DF	BRA	Gabriel Paulista	18 (3)	1	4	0	0	0	4	0	0	0	26 (3)	1
6	DF	FRA	Laurent Koscielny	33	4	3	0	0	0	7	0	1	0	44	4
7	MF	CZE	Tomáš Rosický	0	0	0 (1)	0	0	0	0	0	0	0	0 (1)	0
8	MF	ESP	Mikel Arteta	0 (9)	0	0 (2)	0	1	0	1	0	0 (1)	0	2 (12)	0
10	MF	ENG	Jack Wilshere	1 (2)	0	0	0	0	0	0	0	0	0	1 (2)	0
11	MF	GER	Mesut Özil	35	6	1	0	0	0	8	2	1	0	45	8
12	FW	FRA	Olivier Giroud	26 (12)	16	4 (1)	3	2	0	5 (2)	5	0 (1)	0	37 (16)	24
13	GK	COL	David Ospina	4	0	4	0	1	0	3	0	0	0	12	0
14	FW	ENG	Theo Walcott	15 (13)	5	3 (2)	2	0 (2)	0	3 (3)	2	1	0	22 (20)	9
15	MF	ENG	Alex Oxlade-Chamberlain	9 (13)	1	2 (1)	0	2	0	3 (2)	0	1	1	17 (16)	2
16	MF	WAL	Aaron Ramsey	29 (2)	5	0 (2)	1	1	0	3 (2)	0	1	0	34 (6)	6
17	FW	CHI	Alexis Sánchez	28 (2)	13	2 (1)	1	0 (1)	0	7	3	0	0	37 (4)	17
18	DF	ESP	Nacho Monreal	36 (1)	0	1	0	0	0	6	0	1	0	44 (1)	0
19	MF	ESP	Santi Cazorla	15	0	0	0	0	0	5	0	1	0	21	0
20	MF	FRA	Mathieu Flamini	12 (4)	0	2	0	2	2	3 (1)	0	0	0	19 (5)	2
21	DF	ENG	Calum Chambers	2 (10)	0	5	1	2	0	0 (3)	0	0	0	9 (13)	1
23	FW	ENG	Danny Welbeck	7 (4)	4	1 (1)	1	0	0	1 (1)	0	0	0	9 (6)	5
24	DF	ESP	Héctor Bellerín	36	1	1	0	0	0	6	0	1	0	44	1
28	FW	CRC	Joel Campbell	11 (8)	3	4	1	2	0	3 (2)	0	0	0	20 (10)	4
33	GK	CZE	Petr Čech	34	0	1	0	1	0	5	0	1	0	42	0
34	MF	FRA	Francis Coquelin	21 (5)	0	2	0	0	0	4 (2)	0	1	0	28 (7)	0
35	MF	EGY	Mohamed Elneny	9 (2)	0	4	0	0	0	1	1	0	0	14 (2)	1
36	MF	FRA	Ismaël Bennacer	0	0	0	0	0 (1)	0	0	0	0	0	0 (1)	0
37	MF	POL	Krystian Bielik	0	0	0	0	0 (1)	0	0	0	0	0	0 (1)	0
45	FW	NGA	Alex Iwobi	8 (5)	2	4 (1)	0	1	0	1 (1)	0	0	0	14 (7)	2
47	MF	FIN	Glen Kamara	0	0	0	0	1	0	0	0	0	0	1	0
54	MF	FRA	Jeff Reine-Adélaïde	0	0	0 (2)	0	0	0	0	0	0	0	0 (2)	0

Source: Arsenal F.C. and 11v11.com

=== Top scorers ===
As of 15 May 2016

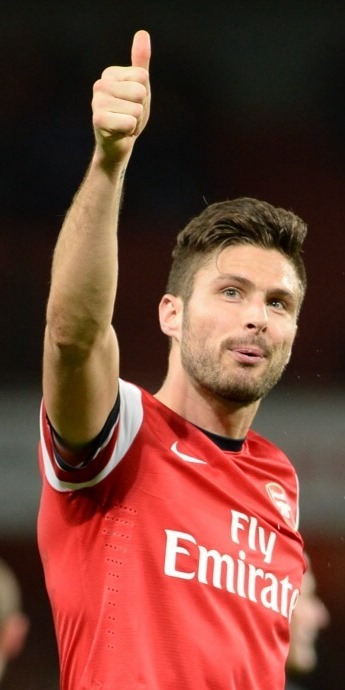
Olivier Giroud top-scored for Arsenal this season, with 24 goals in all competitions.

Rank	Position	Nationality	Number	Name	Premier League	FA Cup	League Cup	Champions League	Community Shield	Total
1	FW	(France)	12	Olivier Giroud	16	3	0	5	0	24
2	FW	(Chile)	17	Alexis Sánchez	13	1	0	3	0	17
3	FW	(England)	14	Theo Walcott	5	2	0	2	0	9
4	MF	(Germany)	11	Mesut Özil	6	0	0	2	0	8
5	MF	(Wales)	16	Aaron Ramsey	5	1	0	0	0	6
6	FW	(England)	23	Danny Welbeck	4	1	0	0	0	5
7	FW	(Costa Rica)	28	Joel Campbell	3	1	0	0	0	4
7	DF	(France)	6	Laurent Koscielny	4	0	0	0	0	4
9	Own goals				3	0	0	0	0	3
10	MF	(France)	20	Mathieu Flamini	0	0	2	0	0	2
10	FW	(Nigeria)	45	Alex Iwobi	2	0	0	0	0	2
10	MF	(England)	15	Alex Oxlade-Chamberlain	1	0	0	0	1	2
13	DF	(Spain)	24	Héctor Bellerín	1	0	0	0	0	1
13	DF	(England)	21	Calum Chambers	0	1	0	0	0	1
13	MF	(Egypt)	35	Mohamed Elneny	0	0	0	1	0	1
13	DF	(Brazil)	5	Gabriel Paulista	1	0	0	0	0	1
13	DF	(England)	3	Kieran Gibbs	1	0	0	0	0	1
TOTALS					65	10	2	13	1	91

Source: Arsenal F.C. and 11v11.com

=== Disciplinary record ===
As of 15 May 2016

Number	Nationality	Position	Name	Premier League		FA Cup		League Cup		Champions League		Community Shield		Total	
Number	Nationality	Position	Name	Yellow card	Red card	Yellow card	Red card	Yellow card	Red card	Yellow card	Red card	Yellow card	Red card	Yellow card	Red card
34	(France)	MF	Francis Coquelin	5	1	0	0	0	0	0	0	1	0	6	1
5	(Brazil)	DF	Gabriel Paulista	3	1	1	0	0	0	2	0	0	0	6	1
12	(France)	FW	Olivier Giroud	2	0	1	0	0	0	3	1	0	0	6	1
19	(Spain)	MF	Santi Cazorla	2	1	0	0	0	0	0	0	0	0	2	1
4	(Germany)	DF	Per Mertesacker	1	1	0	0	0	0	0	0	0	0	1	1
11	(Germany)	MF	Mesut Özil	4	0	1	0	0	0	2	0	0	0	7	0
20	(France)	MF	Mathieu Flamini	3	0	0	0	1	0	1	0	0	0	5	0
6	(France)	DF	Laurent Koscielny	3	0	2	0	0	0	0	0	0	0	5	0
16	(Wales)	MF	Aaron Ramsey	4	0	0	0	0	0	1	0	0	0	5	0
35	(Egypt)	MF	Mohamed Elneny	3	0	1	0	0	0	0	0	0	0	4	0
24	(Spain)	DF	Héctor Bellerín	3	0	0	0	0	0	0	0	0	0	3	0
28	(Costa Rica)	FW	Joel Campbell	0	0	0	0	1	0	2	0	0	0	3	0
18	(Spain)	DF	Nacho Monreal	1	0	0	0	0	0	2	0	0	0	3	0
21	(England)	DF	Calum Chambers	2	0	1	0	0	0	0	0	0	0	3	0
17	(Chile)	FW	Alexis Sánchez	1	0	0	0	0	0	2	0	0	0	3	0
8	(Spain)	MF	Mikel Arteta	1	0	0	0	1	0	0	0	0	0	2	0
2	(France)	DF	Mathieu Debuchy	0	0	0	0	2	0	0	0	0	0	2	0
23	(England)	FW	Danny Welbeck	1	0	0	0	0	0	0	0	0	0	1	0
Total				39	4	7	0	5	0	15	1	1	0	67	5

Source: 11v11.com

=== Clean sheets ===
As of 15 May 2016

Rank	Nationality	Number	Name	Premier League	FA Cup	League Cup	Champions League	Community Shield	Total
1	(Czech Republic)	33	Petr Čech	16	0	0	3	1	20
2	(Colombia)	13	David Ospina	2	2	0	0	0	4
Total				18	2	0	3	1	24

Source: 11v11.com (Petr Čech) and 11v11.com (David Ospina)

== Pre-season ==
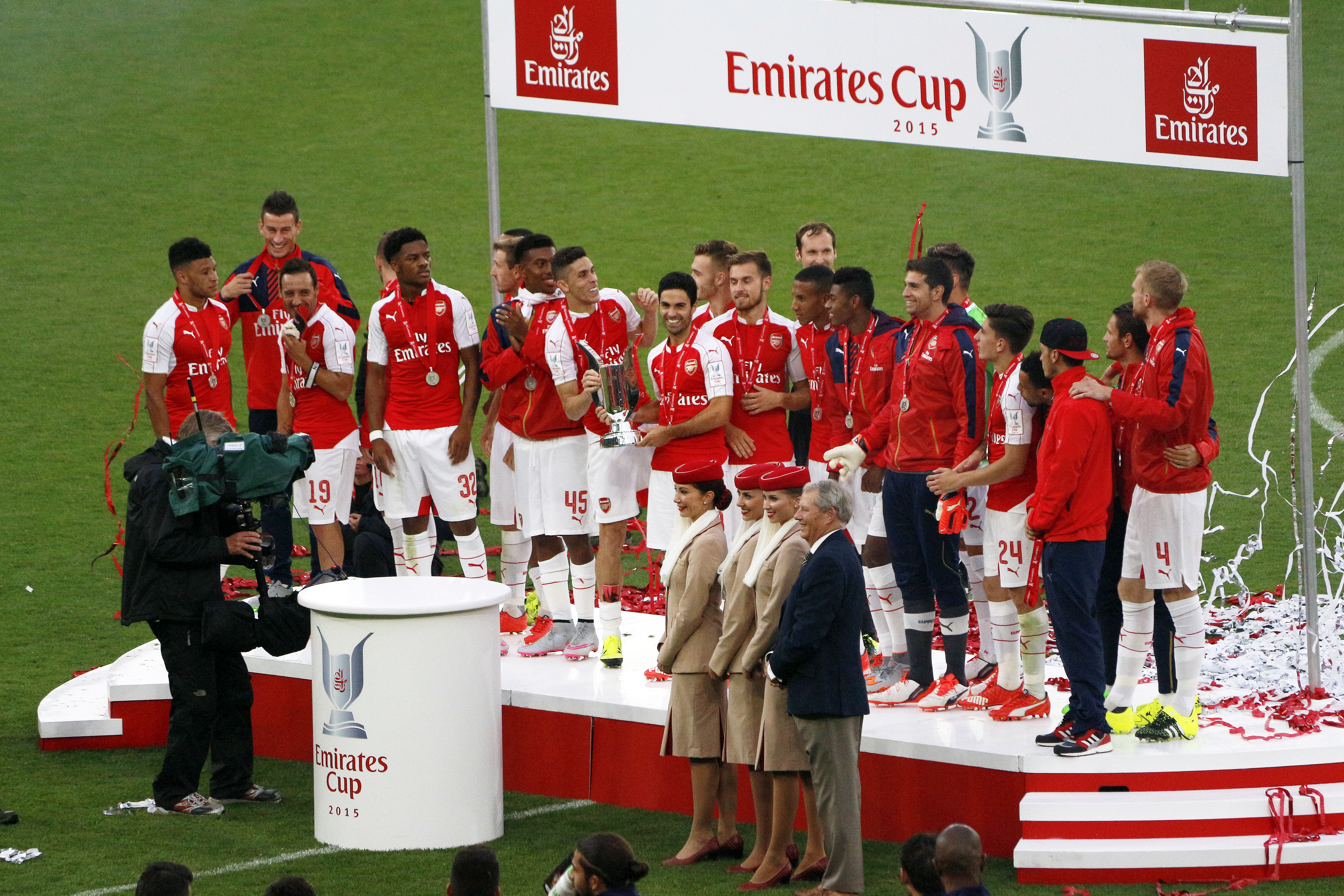
Arsenal celebrate winning the 2015 edition of the Emirates Cup.

Arsenal started the 2015–16 season retaining Puma as their kit supplier and Emirates as their shirt sponsor. In July, they went on a preseason tour to Asia. During this, they participated in the Premier League Asia Trophy in Singapore along with fellow Premier League sides Everton and Stoke City as well as a Singapore Selection XI. Following this tournament, Arsenal will then play in their traditional yearly Emirates Cup tournament at the Emirates Stadium, with Lyon, Villarreal and VfL Wolfsburg also participating. The match against Wolfsburg marked the return of former Arsenal striker Nicklas Bendtner, who made his first return to the Emirates Stadium with Wolfsburg.

=== Pre-season matches ===
Win Draw Loss

15 July 2015 Asia Trophy Semifinal	Singapore XI	0–4	Arsenal	Kallang, Singapore
13:30 BST		Report	Akpom 30', 76' (pen.), 79'; Wilshere 60' (pen.)	Stadium: National Stadium, Singapore; Referee: Jon Moss

18 July 2015 Asia Trophy Final	Everton	1–3	Arsenal	Kallang, Singapore
13:30 BST	Barkley 75'	Report	Walcott 22'; Cazorla 58'; Özil 62'	Stadium: National Stadium, Singapore; Referee: Craig Pawson

25 July 2015 Emirates Cup	Arsenal	6–0	Lyon	London
16:20 BST	Giroud 29'; Oxlade-Chamberlain 34'; Iwobi 35'; Ramsey 38'; Coquelin (yellow card) 45+1'; Özil 62'; Cazorla 84'	Report	Rose (yellow card) 17'; Jenssen (yellow card) 36'	Stadium: Emirates Stadium; Referee: Jon Moss

26 July 2015 Emirates Cup	Arsenal	1–0	VfL Wolfsburg	London
16:20 BST	Walcott 50'; Cazorla (yellow card) 85'; Monreal (yellow card) 89'	Report	Klose (yellow card) 35'; Naldo (yellow card) 73'; Arnold (yellow card) 85'	Stadium: Emirates Stadium; Referee: Craig Pawson

== Competitions ==
=== Overall ===
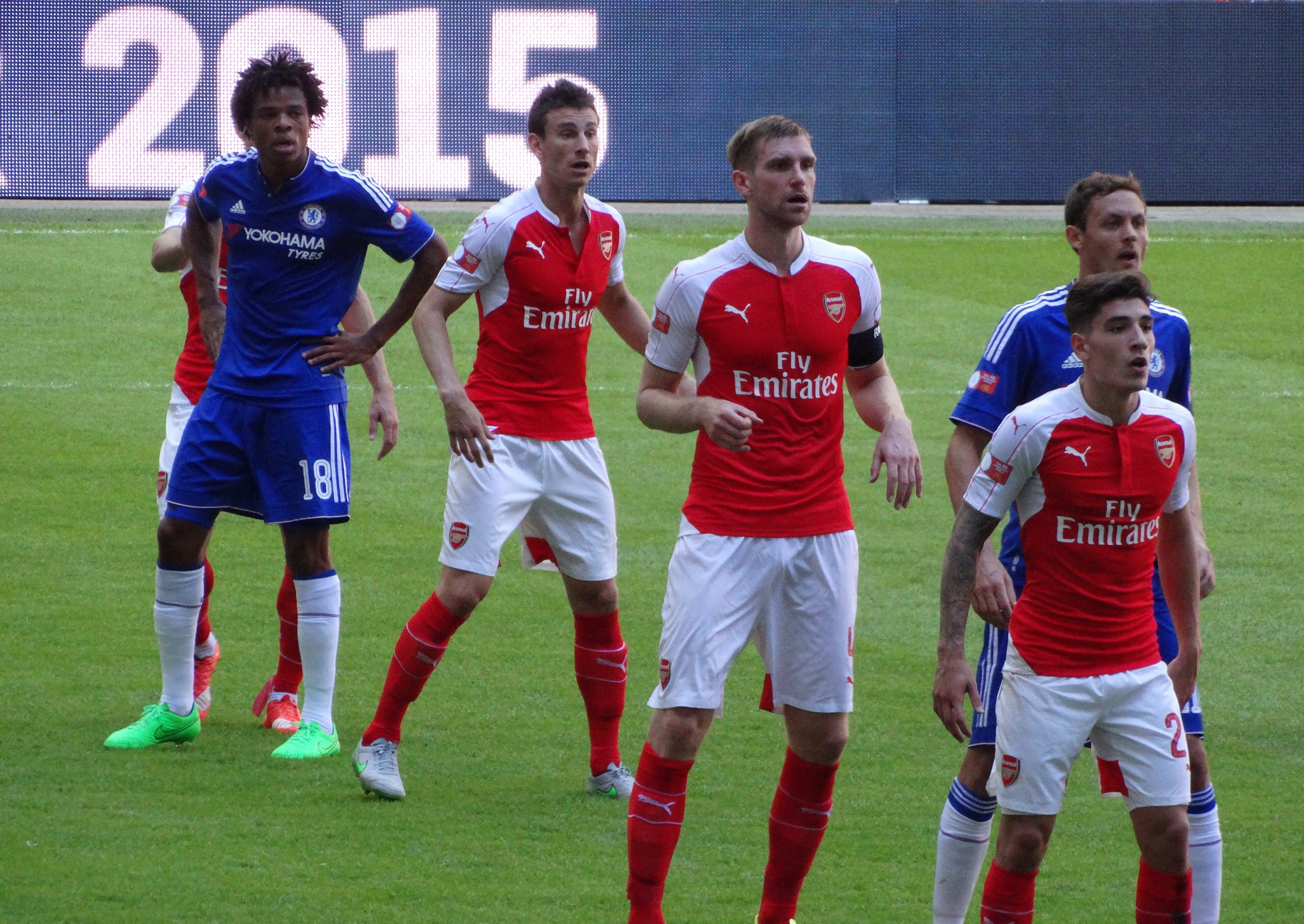
The Arsenal backline during the 2015 FA Community Shield

Competition	Started round	Final position / round	First match	Last match
Premier League	—	2nd	9 August 2015	15 May 2016
FA Community Shield	Final	Winners	2 August 2015	
FA Cup	Third round	Sixth round	9 January 2016	13 March 2016
League Cup	Third round	Fourth round	23 September 2015	27 October 2015
UEFA Champions League	Group stage	Round of 16	16 September 2015	16 March 2016

Updated to match played 15 May 2016
Source: Competitions

=== Overview ===
Competition	Record							
Competition	G	W	D	L	GF	GA	GD	Win %
Premier League	38	20	11	7	65	36	+29	52.63
FA Community Shield	1	1	0	0	1	0	+1	100.00
FA Cup	5	3	1	1	10	4	+6	60.00
League Cup	2	1	0	1	2	4	−2	50.00
Champions League	8	3	0	5	13	15	−2	37.50
Total	54	28	12	14	91	59	+32	51.85

Source: Competitions

=== FA Community Shield ===
Win Draw Loss

2 August 2015 Community Shield	Arsenal	1–0	Chelsea	London
15:00 BST	Oxlade-Chamberlain 24'; Coquelin (yellow card) 67'	Arsenal Report; BBC Report	Azpilicueta (yellow card) 65'	Stadium: Wembley Stadium; Attendance: 85,437; Referee: Anthony Taylor

=== Premier League ===
==== League table ====
Pos	Team	Pld	W	D	L	GF	GA	GD	Pts	Qualification or relegation
1	Leicester City (C)	38	23	12	3	68	36	+32	81	Qualification for the Champions League group stage
2	Arsenal	38	20	11	7	65	36	+29	71	Qualification for the Champions League group stage
3	Tottenham Hotspur	38	19	13	6	69	35	+34	70	Qualification for the Champions League group stage
4	Manchester City	38	19	9	10	71	41	+30	66	Qualification for the Champions League play-off round
5	Manchester United	38	19	9	10	49	35	+14	66	Qualification for the Europa League group stage (Note: Manchester United qualified for the Europa League group stage by winning the 2015–16 FA Cup. As they had also qualified by their virtue of their league position (5th), this spot was passed to the next-highest ranked team (6th), Southampton.)

Source: Barclays Premier League
Rules for classification: 1) Points; 2) Goal difference; 3) Goals scored; 4) Play-offs (only if needed to decide champion, teams for relegation or teams for UEFA competitions).
(C) Champions

==== Results summary ====
Overall								Home						Away					
Pld	W	D	L	GF	GA	GD	Pts	W	D	L	GF	GA	GD	W	D	L	GF	GA	GD
38	20	11	7	65	36	+29	71	12	4	3	31	11	+20	8	7	4	34	25	+9

Last updated: 15 May 2016.
Source: Premier League

==== Results by matchday ====
Matchday	1	2	3	4	5	6	7	8	9	10	11	12	13	14	15	16	17	18	19	20	21	22	23	24	25	26	27	28	29	30	31	32	33	34	35	36	37	38
Ground	H	A	H	A	H	A	A	H	A	H	A	H	A	A	H	A	H	A	H	H	A	A	H	H	A	H	A	H	A	A	H	A	H	H	A	H	A	H
Result	L	W	D	W	W	L	W	W	W	W	W	D	L	D	W	W	W	L	W	W	D	D	L	D	W	W	L	L	D	W	W	D	D	W	D	W	D	W
Position	20	11	9	5	3	5	4	2	2	1	2	2	4	4	2	1	2	2	1	1	1	1	3	4	3	3	3	3	3	3	3	3	4	3	4	3	3	2

Updated to match(es) played on 15 May 2016. Source: Statto.com
A = Away; H = Home; W = Win; D = Draw; L = Loss

==== Matches ====
On 17 June 2015, the fixtures for the forthcoming season were announced.

Win Draw Loss

9 August 2015 1	Arsenal	0–2	West Ham United	Holloway, London
13:30 BST	Monreal (yellow card) 69'	Arsenal report BBC report	Noble (yellow card) 5'; Ogbonna (yellow card) 7'; Tomkins (yellow card) 37'; Kouyaté 43'; Zárate 57'	Stadium: Emirates Stadium; Attendance: 59,996; Referee: Martin Atkinson

16 August 2015 2	Crystal Palace	1–2	Arsenal	Selhurst, London
13:30 BST	Ward 28'; McArthur (yellow card) 45+1'	Arsenal report BBC report	Giroud 16'; Coquelin (yellow card) 41'; Delaney 55' (o.g.)	Stadium: Selhurst Park; Attendance: 24,732; Referee: Lee Mason

24 August 2015 3	Arsenal	0–0	Liverpool	Holloway, London
20:00 BST	Gabriel (yellow card) 65'	Arsenal report BBC report	Škrtel (yellow card) 61'; Can (yellow card) 66'; Gomez (yellow card) 79'; Mignolet (yellow card) 85'	Stadium: Emirates Stadium; Attendance: 60,080; Referee: Michael Oliver

29 August 2015 4	Newcastle United	0–1	Arsenal	Newcastle upon Tyne
12:45 BST	Sissoko (yellow card) 3'; Mitrović (red card) 16'; Mbemba (yellow card) 19'; Thauvin (yellow card) 26'; Anita (yellow card) 48'; Wijnaldum (yellow card) 49'; Coloccini (yellow card) 90+2'	Arsenal report BBC report	Cazorla (yellow card) 49'; Coloccini 52' (o.g.)	Stadium: St James' Park; Attendance: 50,388; Referee: Andre Marriner

12 September 2015 5	Arsenal	2–0	Stoke City	Holloway, London
15:00 BST	Walcott 31'; Özil (yellow card) 38'; Giroud 85'	Arsenal report BBC report	Bardsley (yellow card) 81'	Stadium: Emirates Stadium; Attendance: 59,963; Referee: Jonathan Moss

19 September 2015 6	Chelsea	2–0	Arsenal	Fulham, London
12:45 BST	Costa (yellow card) 45'; Ivanović (yellow card) 49'; Zouma 53'; Oscar (yellow card) 64'; Chambers 90+1' (o.g.)	Arsenal report BBC report	Cazorla (yellow card) 31' (yellow-red card) 79'; Gabriel (yellow card) 45' (red card) 45+1'; Chambers (yellow card) 72'	Stadium: Stamford Bridge; Attendance: 41,584; Referee: Mike Dean

26 September 2015 7	Leicester City	2–5	Arsenal	Leicester
15:00 BST	Vardy 13', 89'; Drinkwater (yellow card) 72'	Arsenal report BBC report	Walcott 18'; Sánchez 33', 57', 81'; Arteta (yellow card) 69'; Giroud 90+3'	Stadium: King Power Stadium; Attendance: 32,047; Referee: Craig Pawson

4 October 2015 8	Arsenal	3–0	Manchester United	Holloway, London
16:00 BST	Sánchez 6', 19'; Özil 7'; Coquelin (yellow card) 51'	Arsenal report BBC report	Young (yellow card) 22'; Darmian (yellow card) 30'; Rooney (yellow card) 55'	Stadium: Emirates Stadium; Attendance: 60,084; Referee: Anthony Taylor

17 October 2015 9	Watford	0–3	Arsenal	Watford
17:30 BST	Nyom (yellow card) 47'; Gomes (yellow card) 63'	Arsenal report BBC report	Mertesacker (yellow card) 58'; Sánchez 62'; Giroud 68'; Ramsey 74'	Stadium: Vicarage Road; Attendance: 20,721; Referee: Mike Jones

24 October 2015 10	Arsenal	2–1	Everton	Holloway, London
17:30 BST	Coquelin (yellow card) 25'; Giroud 36', (yellow card) 69'; Koscielny 38'	Arsenal report BBC report	Barkley 44'; Barry (yellow card) 67' (yellow-red card) 90+4'	Stadium: Emirates Stadium; Attendance: 59,985; Referee: Lee Mason

31 October 2015 11	Swansea City	0–3	Arsenal	Swansea
15:00 GMT	Ki (yellow card) 57'; Williams (yellow card) 89'	Arsenal report BBC report	Giroud 49'; Koscielny 68'; Campbell 73'	Stadium: Liberty Stadium; Attendance: 20,937; Referee: Kevin Friend

8 November 2015 12	Arsenal	1–1	Tottenham Hotspur	Holloway, London
16:00 GMT	Gibbs 77'	Arsenal report BBC report	Kane 32'; Lamela (yellow card) 55'	Stadium: Emirates Stadium; Attendance: 60,060; Referee: Martin Atkinson

21 November 2015 13	West Bromwich Albion	2–1	Arsenal	West Bromwich
15:00 GMT	Morrison 35', (yellow card) 43'; Arteta 40' (o.g.); Brunt (yellow card) 83'; Myhill (yellow card) 90+1'	Arsenal report BBC report	Giroud 28', (yellow card) 42'; Bellerín (yellow card) 32'	Stadium: The Hawthorns; Attendance: 24,343; Referee: Mark Clattenburg

29 November 2015 14	Norwich City	1–1	Arsenal	Norwich
16:15 GMT	Grabban 43'; O'Neil (yellow card) 57'	Arsenal report BBC report	Özil 30'; Cazorla (yellow card) 54'	Stadium: Carrow Road; Attendance: 27,091; Referee: Jonathan Moss

5 December 2015 15	Arsenal	3–1	Sunderland	Holloway, London
15:00 GMT	Campbell 33'; Koscielny (yellow card) 44'; Giroud 63'; Ramsey 90+3'	Arsenal report BBC report	Giroud 45' (o.g.); Yedlin (yellow card) 80'	Stadium: Emirates Stadium; Attendance: 59,937; Referee: Robert Madley

13 December 2015 16	Aston Villa	0–2	Arsenal	Birmingham
13:30 GMT		Arsenal report BBC report	Giroud 8' (pen.); Ramsey 38'	Stadium: Villa Park; Attendance: 33,285; Referee: Kevin Friend

21 December 2015 17	Arsenal	2–1	Manchester City	Holloway, London
20:00 GMT	Walcott 33'; Giroud 45+1'	Arsenal report BBC report	Silva (yellow card) 31'; Otamendi (yellow card) 48'; Touré 82'	Stadium: Emirates Stadium; Attendance: 60,053; Referee: Andre Marriner

26 December 2015 18	Southampton	4–0	Arsenal	Southampton
19:45 GMT	Martina 19'; Long (yellow card) 34', (goal) 55', 90+2'; Fonte 69'	Arsenal report BBC report		Stadium: St Mary's Stadium; Attendance: 31,669; Referee: Jonathan Moss

28 December 2015 19	Arsenal	2–0	Bournemouth	Holloway, London
17:30 GMT	Gabriel 27'; Ramsey (yellow card) 30'; Chambers (yellow card) 61'; Özil 63'	Arsenal report BBC report		Stadium: Emirates Stadium; Attendance: 59,983; Referee: Roger East

2 January 2016 20	Arsenal	1–0	Newcastle United	Holloway, London
15:00 GMT	Koscielny 72'; Flamini (yellow card) 82'; Özil (yellow card) 90+2'	Arsenal report BBC report	Colback (yellow card) 35'; Janmaat (yellow card) 68'	Stadium: Emirates Stadium; Attendance: 59,257; Referee: Anthony Taylor

13 January 2016 21	Liverpool	3–3	Arsenal	Liverpool
20:00 GMT	Firmino 10', 19', (yellow card) 10'; Clyne (yellow card) 53'; Allen 90'	Arsenal report BBC report	Ramsey 14'; Giroud 25', 55'	Stadium: Anfield; Attendance: 44,109; Referee: Mike Jones

17 January 2016 22	Stoke City	0–0	Arsenal	Stoke-on-Trent
16:15 GMT		Arsenal report BBC report		Stadium: Britannia Stadium; Attendance: 27,683; Referee: Craig Pawson

24 January 2016 23	Arsenal	0–1	Chelsea	Holloway, London
16:00 GMT	Mertesacker (red card) 18'; Flamini (yellow card) 45'	Arsenal report BBC report	Oscar (yellow card) 11'; Costa 23'; Matić (yellow card) 60'; Mikel (yellow card) 72'	Stadium: Emirates Stadium; Attendance: 60,072; Referee: Mark Clattenburg

2 February 2016 24	Arsenal	0–0	Southampton	Holloway, London
19:45 GMT	Coquelin (yellow card) 87'; Gabriel (yellow card) 89'	Arsenal report BBC report	Soares (yellow card) 61'	Stadium: Emirates Stadium; Attendance: 60,044; Referee: Lee Mason

7 February 2016 25	Bournemouth	0–2	Arsenal	Bournemouth
13:30 GMT		Arsenal report BBC report	Flamini (yellow card) 9'; Özil 23'; Oxlade-Chamberlain 24'	Stadium: Dean Court; Attendance: 11,357; Referee: Kevin Friend

14 February 2016 26	Arsenal	2–1	Leicester City	Holloway, London
12:00 GMT	Coquelin (yellow card) 36'; Koscielny (yellow card) 44'; Ramsey (yellow card) 45+2'; Walcott 70'; Welbeck 90+5', (yellow card) 90+6'	Arsenal report BBC report	Vardy 45' (pen.); Simpson (yellow card) 49' (yellow-red card) 54'; Fuchs (yellow card) 52'; Kanté (yellow card) 57'; Wasilewski (yellow card) 90+4'	Stadium: Emirates Stadium; Attendance: 60,009; Referee: Martin Atkinson

28 February 2016 27	Manchester United	3–2	Arsenal	Manchester
14:05 GMT	Varela (yellow card) 9'; Carrick (yellow card) 22'; Rashford 29', 32'; Herrera 65', (yellow card) 72'; Januzaj (yellow card) 90+3'	Arsenal report BBC report	Welbeck 40'; Özil 69', (yellow card) 90+2'; Ramsey (yellow card) 72'; Elneny (yellow card) 73'	Stadium: Old Trafford; Attendance: 75,329; Referee: Craig Pawson

2 March 2016 28	Arsenal	1–2	Swansea City	Holloway, London
19:45 GMT	Campbell 15'	Arsenal report BBC report	Routledge 32', (yellow card) 77'; Ayew (yellow card) 40'; Williams 74'	Stadium: Emirates Stadium; Attendance: 59,905; Referee: Robert Madley

5 March 2016 29	Tottenham Hotspur	2–2	Arsenal	London
12:45 GMT	Lamela (yellow card) 28'; Alderweireld 60'; Kane 62'; Dier (yellow card) 73'	Arsenal report BBC report	Bellerín (yellow card) 26'; Coquelin (yellow card) 29' (yellow-red card) 55'; Ramsey 39'; Sánchez (yellow card) 66', (goal) 76'	Stadium: White Hart Lane; Attendance: 35,762; Referee: Michael Oliver

19 March 2016 30	Everton	0–2	Arsenal	Liverpool
12:45 GMT		Arsenal report BBC report	Welbeck 7'; Iwobi 42'	Stadium: Goodison Park; Attendance: 39,270; Referee: Mark Clattenburg

2 April 2016 31	Arsenal	4–0	Watford	Holloway, London
15:00 BST	Sánchez 4'; Iwobi 38'; Bellerín 48'; Elneny (yellow card) 84'; Walcott 90'	Arsenal report BBC report	Nyom (yellow card) 61'	Stadium: Emirates Stadium; Attendance: 59,981; Referee: Anthony Taylor

9 April 2016 32	West Ham United	3–3	Arsenal	London
12:45 BST	Carroll (yellow card) 4', (goal) 44', 45+2', 52'; Antonio (yellow card) 90+3'	Arsenal report BBC report	Özil 18'; Sánchez 35'; Koscielny 70'	Stadium: Boleyn Ground; Attendance: 34,977; Referee: Craig Pawson

17 April 2016 33	Arsenal	1–1	Crystal Palace	Holloway, London
16:00 BST	Sánchez 45+1'	Arsenal report BBC Report	Ledley (yellow card) 57'; Dann (yellow card) 73'; Bolasie 81'	Stadium: Emirates Stadium; Attendance: 59,961; Referee: Roger East

21 April 2016 34	Arsenal	2–0	West Bromwich Albion	Holloway, London
19:45 BST	Sánchez 6', 38'	Arsenal report BBC Report	McAuley (yellow card) 41'	Stadium: Emirates Stadium; Attendance: 59,568; Referee: Jonathan Moss

24 April 2016 35	Sunderland	0–0	Arsenal	Sunderland
14:05 BST	Borini (yellow card) 58'; Khazri (yellow card) 90+3'	Arsenal report BBC report	Ramsey (yellow card) 40'; Bellerín (yellow card) 49'; Elneny (yellow card) 76'; Koscielny (yellow card) 90+2'	Stadium: Stadium of Light; Attendance: 45,420; Referee: Mike Dean

30 April 2016 36	Arsenal	1–0	Norwich City	Holloway, London
17:30 BST	Welbeck 59'; Özil (yellow card) 85'	Arsenal report BBC report		Stadium: Emirates Stadium; Attendance: 59,989; Referee: Mike Jones

8 May 2016 37	Manchester City	2–2	Arsenal	Manchester
16:00 BST	Agüero 8'; De Bruyne 51'; Otamendi (yellow card) 90+1'; Fernandinho (yellow card) 90+2'	Arsenal report BBC Report	Giroud 10'; Sánchez 68'; Gabriel (yellow card) 71'	Stadium: Etihad Stadium; Attendance: 54,425; Referee: Anthony Taylor

15 May 2016 38	Arsenal	4–0	Aston Villa	Holloway, London
15:00 BST	Giroud 5', 78', 80'; Bunn 90+2' (o.g.)	BBC report	Sánchez (yellow card) 39'	Stadium: Emirates Stadium; Attendance: 60,007; Referee: Mark Clattenburg

=== FA Cup ===
Win Draw Loss

9 January 2016 Third round	Arsenal	3–1	Sunderland	Holloway, London
15:00 GMT	Campbell 25'; Ramsey 72'; Giroud 75'; Gabriel (yellow card) 90+3'	Arsenal report BBC report	Lens 17'	Stadium: Emirates Stadium; Attendance: 53,349; Referee: Martin Atkinson

30 January 2016 Fourth round	Arsenal	2–1	Burnley	Holloway, London
15:00 GMT	Chambers 19'; Sánchez 53'; Koscielny (yellow card) 73'	Arsenal report BBC report	Vokes 30'; Arfield (yellow card) 65'	Stadium: Emirates Stadium; Attendance: 59,932; Referee: Roger East

20 February 2016 Fifth round	Arsenal	0–0	Hull City	Holloway, London
12:45 GMT	Koscielny (yellow card) 41'; Chambers (yellow card) 56'	Arsenal report BBC report	Maguire (yellow card) 31'; Maloney (yellow card) 33'; Bruce (yellow card) 90'	Stadium: Emirates Stadium; Attendance: 59,830; Referee: Mike Dean

8 March 2016 Replay	Hull City	0–4	Arsenal	Kingston upon Hull
19:00 GMT	Diamé (yellow card) 47'; Maguire (yellow card) 51'	Arsenal report BBC report	Elneny (yellow card) 32'; Giroud (yellow card) 34', (goal) 41', 71'; Walcott 77', 88'	Stadium: KC Stadium; Attendance: 20,993; Referee: Mike Jones

13 March 2016 Sixth round	Arsenal	1–2	Watford	Holloway, London
13:30 GMT	Özil (yellow card) 74'; Welbeck 88'	Arsenal report BBC report	Pantilimon (yellow card) 43'; Ighalo 50'; Guedioura 63'	Stadium: Emirates Stadium; Referee: Andre Marriner

=== League Cup ===
Win Draw Loss

23 September 2015 Third round	Tottenham Hotspur	1–2	Arsenal	Tottenham, London
19:45 BST	Chambers 56' (o.g.); Alli (yellow card) 76'	Arsenal report BBC report	Flamini 26', 78', (yellow card) 37'; Arteta (yellow card) 33'; Debuchy (yellow card) 40'	Stadium: White Hart Lane; Attendance: 35,687; Referee: Andre Marriner

27 October 2015 Fourth round	Sheffield Wednesday	3–0	Arsenal	Sheffield
19:45 GMT	Wallace 27', (yellow card) 45+4'; Lucas João 40'; Hutchinson (yellow card) 30', (goal) 51'; Loovens (yellow card) 59'	Arsenal Report; BBC report	Debuchy (yellow card) 59'; Campbell (yellow card) 86'	Stadium: Hillsborough Stadium; Attendance: 35,065; Referee: Graham Scott

=== UEFA Champions League ===
Arsenal qualified for the group stage of the 2015–16 UEFA Champions League due to finishing third in the 2014–15 Premier League. This means that Arsenal have qualified for the UEFA Champions League for the 18th consecutive year. Following changes to UEFA qualification rules, pot 1 for group stage draws would now consist of the Champions League holders and the champions of the seven highest ranked associations. Arsenal having previously been seeded in pot 1 for the Champions League draw as one of the top 8 ranked teams in UEFA, dropped into pot 2 for the 2015–16 UEFA Champions League group stage draw with the remainder of the highest seeded non-champions according to UEFA coefficient.

==== Group stage ====
Pos	Team	Pld	W	D	L	GF	GA	GD	Pts	Qualification	BAY	ARS	OLY	DZG
1	(Germany) Bayern Munich	6	5	0	1	19	3	+16	15	Advance to knockout phase	—	5–1	4–0	5–0
2	(England) Arsenal	6	3	0	3	12	10	+2	9	Advance to knockout phase	2–0	—	2–3	3–0
3	(Greece) Olympiacos	6	3	0	3	6	13	−7	9	Transfer to Europa League	0–3	0–3	—	2–1
4	(Croatia) Dinamo Zagreb	6	1	0	5	3	14	−11	3		0–2	2–1	0–1	—

Source: UEFA
Rules for classification: Group stage tiebreakers

Win Draw Loss

16 September 2015 1	Dinamo Zagreb (Croatia)	2–1	(England) Arsenal	Zagreb, Croatia
19:45 BST	Pivarić 24'; Antolić (yellow card) 47'; Fernandes 58'; Pinto (yellow card) 65'; Rog (yellow card) 90'	Arsenal Report; UEFA Report	Giroud (yellow card) 23' (yellow-red card) 40'; Walcott 79'; Campbell (yellow card) 87'	Stadium: Maksimir Stadium; Attendance: 17,840; Referee: Ovidiu Hațegan (Romania)

29 September 2015 2	Arsenal (England)	2–3	(Greece) Olympiacos	London, England
19:45 BST	Walcott 35'; Sánchez (yellow card) 44', (goal) 65'; Gabriel (yellow card) 45'; Özil (yellow card) 78'	Arsenal Report; UEFA Report	Pardo 33'; Ospina 40' (o.g.); Roberto (yellow card) 64'; Finnbogason 66', (yellow card) 75'; Cambiasso (yellow card) 76'; Fortounis (yellow card) 77'	Stadium: Emirates Stadium; Referee: Bas Nijhuis (Netherlands)

20 October 2015 3	Arsenal (England)	2–0	(Germany) Bayern Munich	London, England
19:45 BST	Giroud 77', (yellow card) 84'; Özil 90+4'	Report		Stadium: Emirates Stadium; Referee: Cüneyt Çakır (Turkey)

4 November 2015 4	Bayern Munich (Germany)	5–1	(England) Arsenal	Munich, Germany
19:45 GMT	Lewandowski 10'; Müller 29', 89'; Alaba 44'; Robben 55'	UEFA Report; BBC Report	Özil (yellow card) 12'; Campbell (yellow card) 24'; Giroud 69'	Stadium: Allianz Arena; Referee: Gianluca Rocchi (Italy)

24 November 2015 5	Arsenal (England)	3–0	(Croatia) Dinamo Zagreb	London, England
19:45 GMT	Özil 29'; Sánchez 33', 69'; Monreal (yellow card) 65'	UEFA Report; BBC Report		Stadium: Emirates Stadium; Referee: Viktor Kassai (Hungary)

9 December 2015 6	Olympiacos (Greece)	0–3	(England) Arsenal	Piraeus, Greece
19:45 GMT	Fortounis (yellow card) 9'	Report	Ramsey (yellow card) 18'; Giroud 29', 49', 66' (pen.), (yellow card) 63'	Stadium: Karaiskakis Stadium; Referee: Nicola Rizzoli (Italy)

==== Knockout phase ====
The draw for the round of 16 was held on 14 December 2015. The first leg was played on 23 February, and the second leg was played on 16 March 2016.

===== Round of 16 =====
23 February 2016 First leg	Arsenal (England)	0–2	(Spain) Barcelona	London, England
19:45 GMT	Monreal (yellow card) 6'	Report	Messi 71', 83' (pen.); Piqué (yellow card) 85'	Stadium: Emirates Stadium; Referee: Cüneyt Çakır (Turkey)

16 March 2016 Second leg	Barcelona (Spain)	3–1 (5–1 agg.)	(England) Arsenal	Barcelona, Spain
19:45 GMT	Neymar 18'; Suárez 65'; Turan (yellow card) 79'; Messi 88'	UEFA Report; BBC Report	Flamini (yellow card) 32'; Gabriel (yellow card) 35'; Sánchez (yellow card) 50'; Elneny 51'; Giroud (yellow card) 85'	Stadium: Camp Nou; Referee: Sergei Karasev (Russia)

== Awards ==
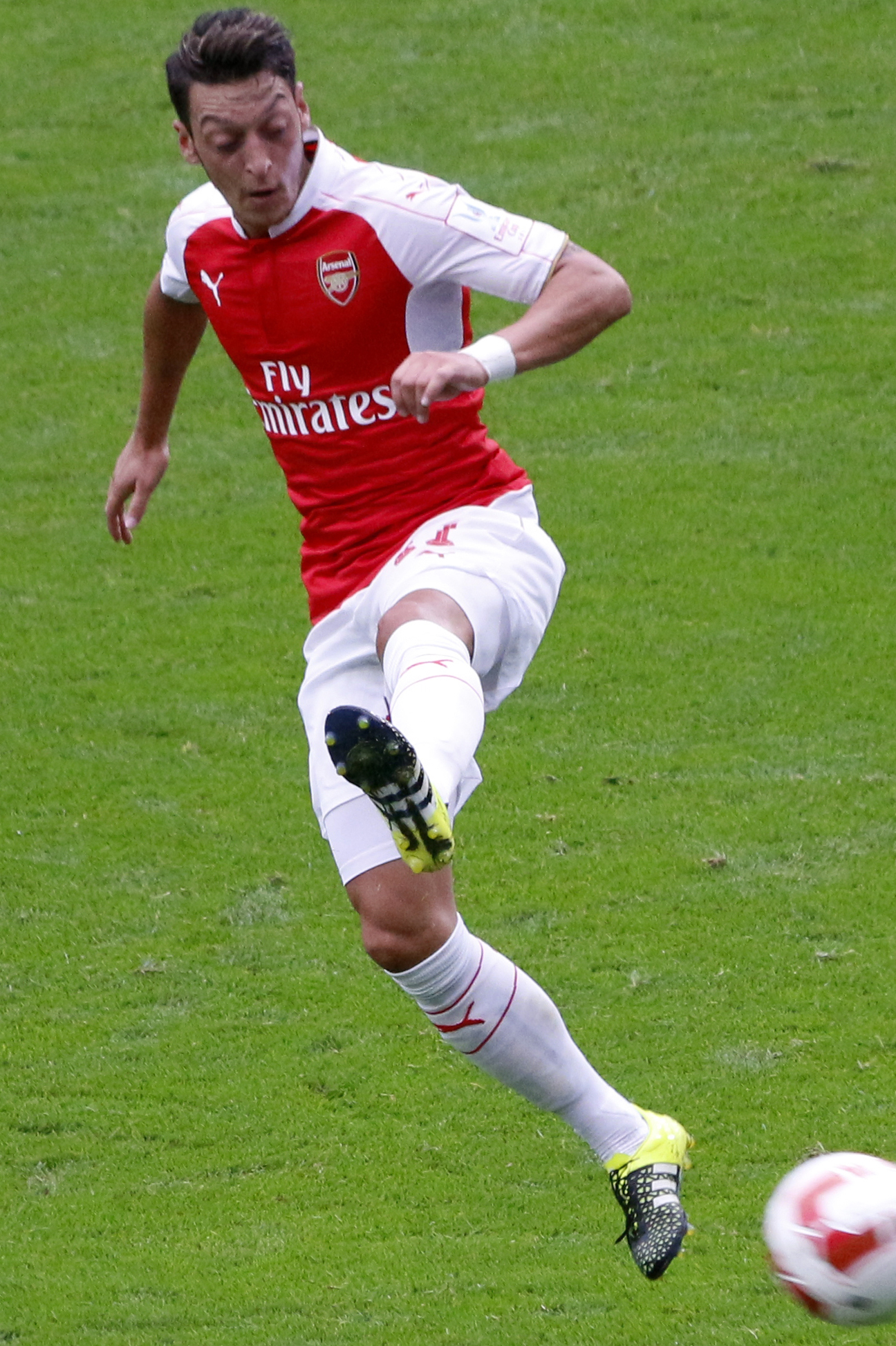
Mesut Özil won four Player of the Month awards in 2015–16.

=== Arsenal Player of the Month award ===
Awarded monthly to the player chosen by fan voting on Arsenal.com

Month	Player	Votes
August	(France) Francis Coquelin	23%
September	(England) Theo Walcott	22%
October	(Germany) Mesut Özil	60.1%
November	(Germany) Mesut Özil	87.2%
December	(Germany) Mesut Özil	81.2%
January	(Czech Republic) Petr Čech	47.4%
February	(Germany) Mesut Özil	36%
March	(Egypt) Mohamed Elneny	31.6%
April	(Egypt) Mohamed Elneny	40.2%
