= Nacho Monreal =

Spanish footballer (born 1986)

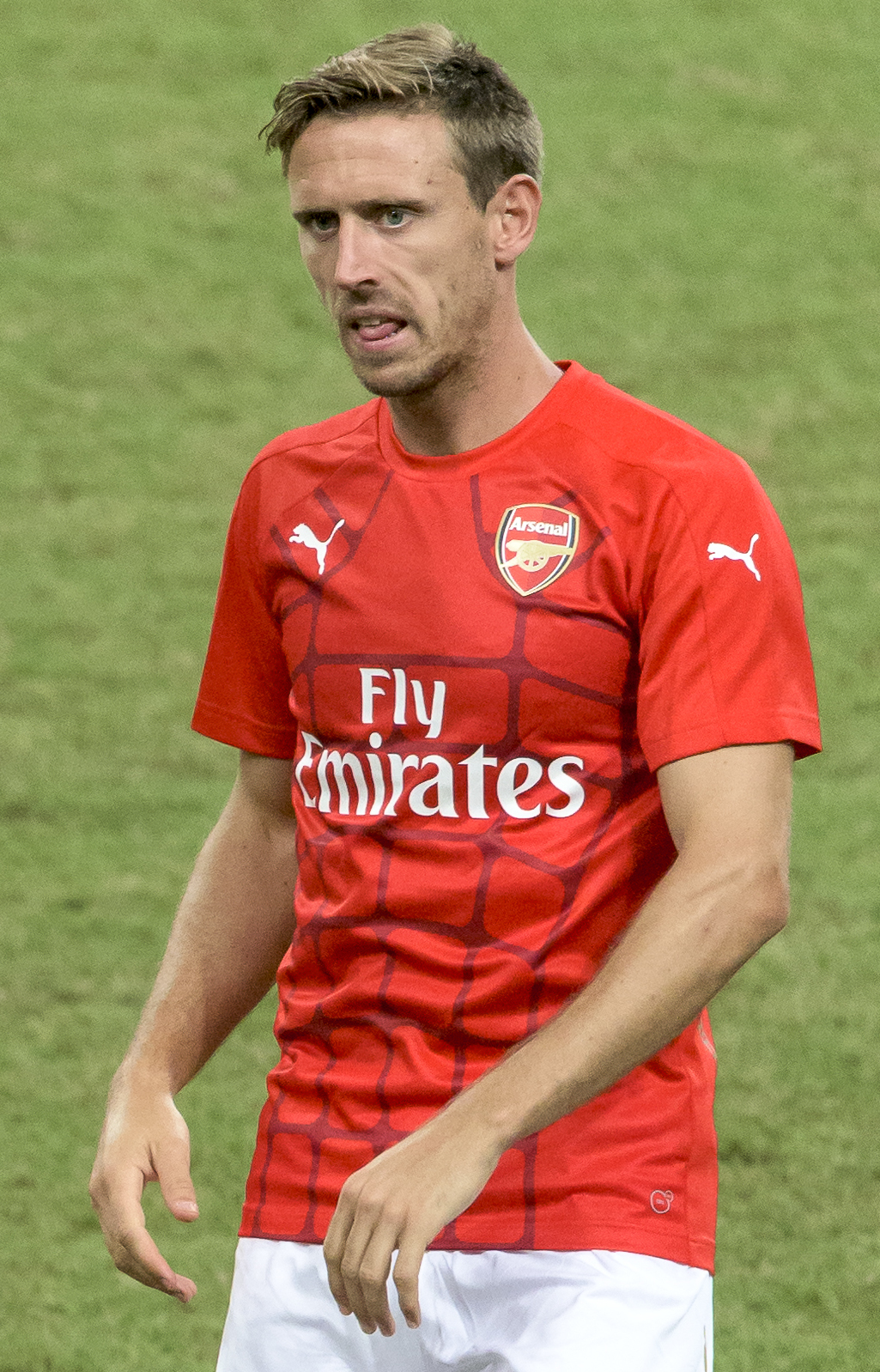
- Monreal warming up with Arsenal in 2015

Personal information
- Full name: Ignacio Monreal Eraso
- Date of birth: 26 February 1986 (age 40)
- Place of birth: Pamplona, Spain
- Height: 1.79 m (5 ft 10 in)
- Position: Defender

Youth career
- Pamplona

Senior career*
Years	Team	Apps	(Gls)
2005–2006	Osasuna B	36	(3)
2006–2011	Osasuna	127	(3)
2011–2013	Málaga	45	(1)
2013–2019	Arsenal	187	(7)
2019–2022	Real Sociedad	55	(3)
Total		450	(17)

International career
2004–2005	Spain U19	4	(0)
2007–2009	Spain U21	9	(0)
2009–2018	Spain	22	(1)
Medal record
Representing Spain
FIFA Confederations Cup
Runner-up	2013 Brazil
- * Club domestic league appearances and goals

Ignacio "Nacho" Monreal Eraso (Spanish pronunciation: [iɣˈnaθjo monreˈal eˈɾaso] or pronounced [ˈnatʃo monreˈal]; born 26 February 1986) is a Spanish former professional footballer who played as a left-back or centre-back.

He started playing with Osasuna in 2005, going on to appear in 144 official games over the course of five La Liga seasons. In 2011 he signed with Málaga and, two years later, joined Arsenal where he won three FA Cup trophies while taking part in 251 matches in all competitions. He ended his career in 2022 with Real Sociedad, winning the 2019–20 Copa del Rey.

A full international from 2009 to 2018, Monreal represented Spain at the 2013 Confederations Cup and the 2018 World Cup.

== Club career ==
=== Osasuna ===
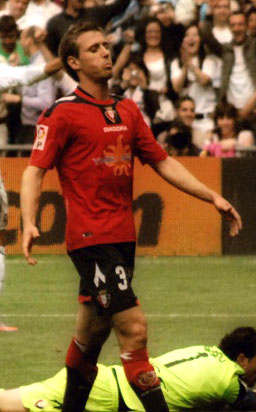
Monreal in action for Osasuna in 2010

Born in Pamplona, Monreal was a product of Osasuna's youth system and made his official debut for his hometown club in an away game against Valencia on 22 October 2006, a 1–0 La Liga loss. He finished his first season with ten league appearances, adding two in that campaign's UEFA Champions League; after the Navarrese's relegation to the UEFA Cup, he appeared in four matches as the team reached the last four, being eliminated by fellow Spaniards Sevilla.

Monreal became first-choice in 2007–08, retaining that status in the subsequent seasons, with another youth product, César Azpilicueta, being the undisputed starter in the other defensive wing.

=== Málaga ===
On 10 June 2011, Monreal signed a five-year contract with Málaga on a €6 million transfer fee. In his first season, he initially battled for first-choice status with Eliseu, but ended up only missing seven games as the club finished fourth and qualified for the Champions League for the first time.

Monreal scored his only goal for the Andalusians on 27 January 2013, in a 3–2 away win over Mallorca.

=== Arsenal ===
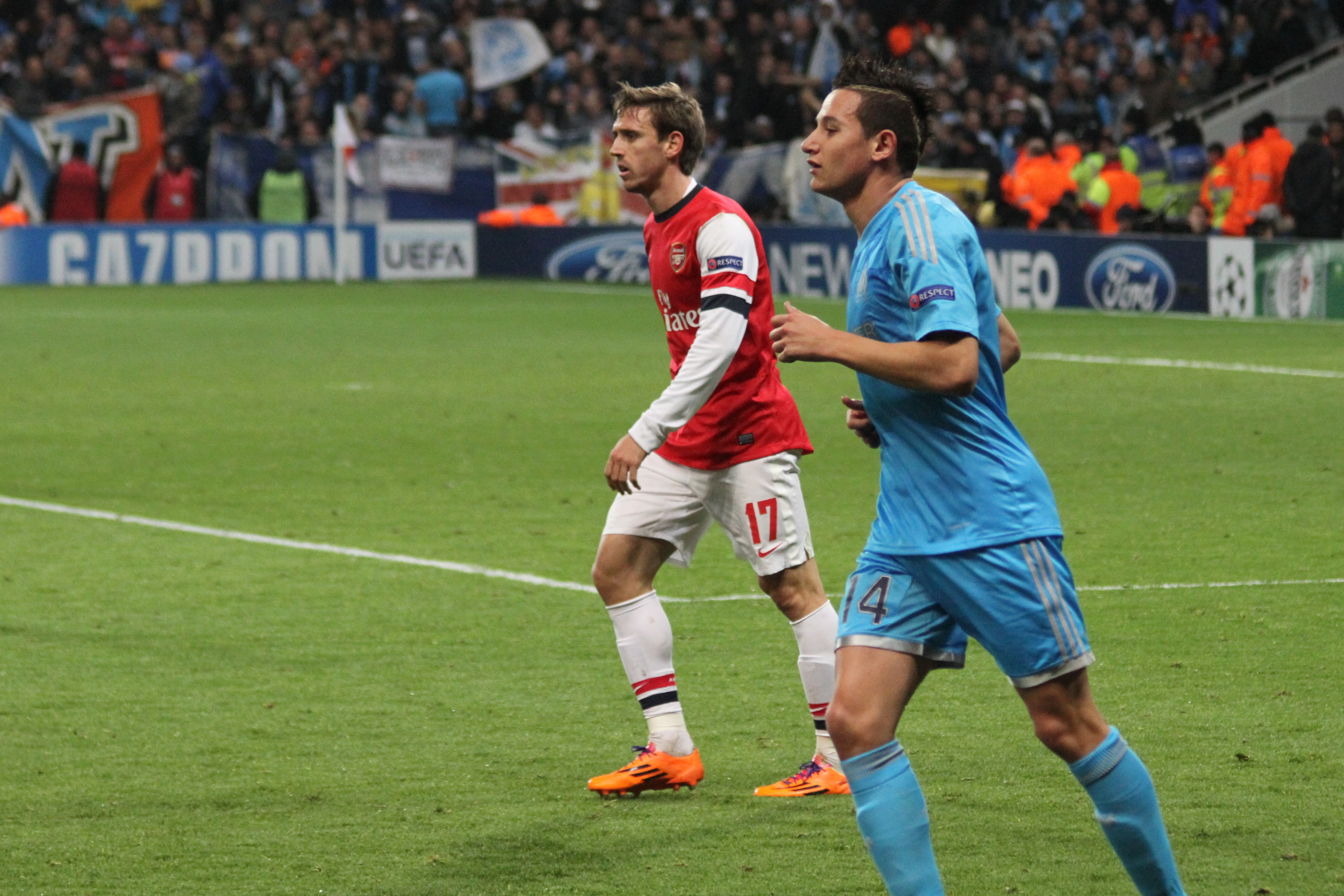
Monreal marking Florian Thauvin during a Champions League match against Marseille in November 2013

On 31 January 2013, Monreal joined English side Arsenal on a long-term contract for an undisclosed fee, believed by Sky Sports to be around £8.5 million. He was given the number 17 shirt, and made his Premier League debut against Stoke City two days later in a 1–0 home win.

On 23 February 2013, Monreal provided the assist for countryman Santi Cazorla to score the winner in a 2–1 victory over Aston Villa. He scored his first goal for the Gunners on 16 March, opening a 2–0 win at Swansea City.

Monreal returned from injury on 21 August 2013 to feature in Arsenal's 3–0 win at Fenerbahçe in the Champions League group stage play-off, playing the last three minutes in the place of Theo Walcott. On 26 September, he scored the deciding penalty in a shootout against West Bromwich Albion to send his team into the fourth round of the League Cup.

Upon the arrival of Alexis Sánchez in the 2014 off-season, Monreal took the vacant number 18 previously worn by Sébastien Squillaci. On 23 August, he assisted Olivier Giroud's late equaliser in a 2–2 draw against Everton. Additionally, an injury crisis in the squad saw him being deployed in an unfamiliar central defender role in a string of games, after Laurent Koscielny was put out of action due to an Achilles tendon injury.

On 9 March 2015, Monreal scored the opening goal in a 2–1 win over Manchester United at Old Trafford that put Arsenal through to the semi-finals of the FA Cup. He played the full 90 minutes in the decisive match, a 4–0 defeat of Aston Villa at Wembley Stadium.

On 19 January 2016, Monreal signed a new long-term contract. On 23 April 2017, he scored the vital equaliser as his team came from behind to defeat Manchester City in the FA Cup semi-final at Wembley.

On 6 November 2017, after good performances on the left side of a three-man defence, Monreal won the Professional Footballers' Association Player of the Month award for October of that year. The following 20 January, he netted once and made two assists before retiring injured 30 minutes into an eventual 4–1 home win against Crystal Palace.

=== Real Sociedad ===
Monreal returned to Spain on 31 August 2019, with the 33-year-old joining Real Sociedad on a two-year contract. He scored on his competitive debut two weeks later, converting an easy tap-in at the hour mark of an eventual 2–0 victory over Atlético Madrid at the Anoeta Stadium.

Monreal missed the entire 2021–22 season, due to a knee injury. On 23 May 2022, the club announced his departure.

On 16 August 2022, Monreal announced his retirement at 36.

== International career ==
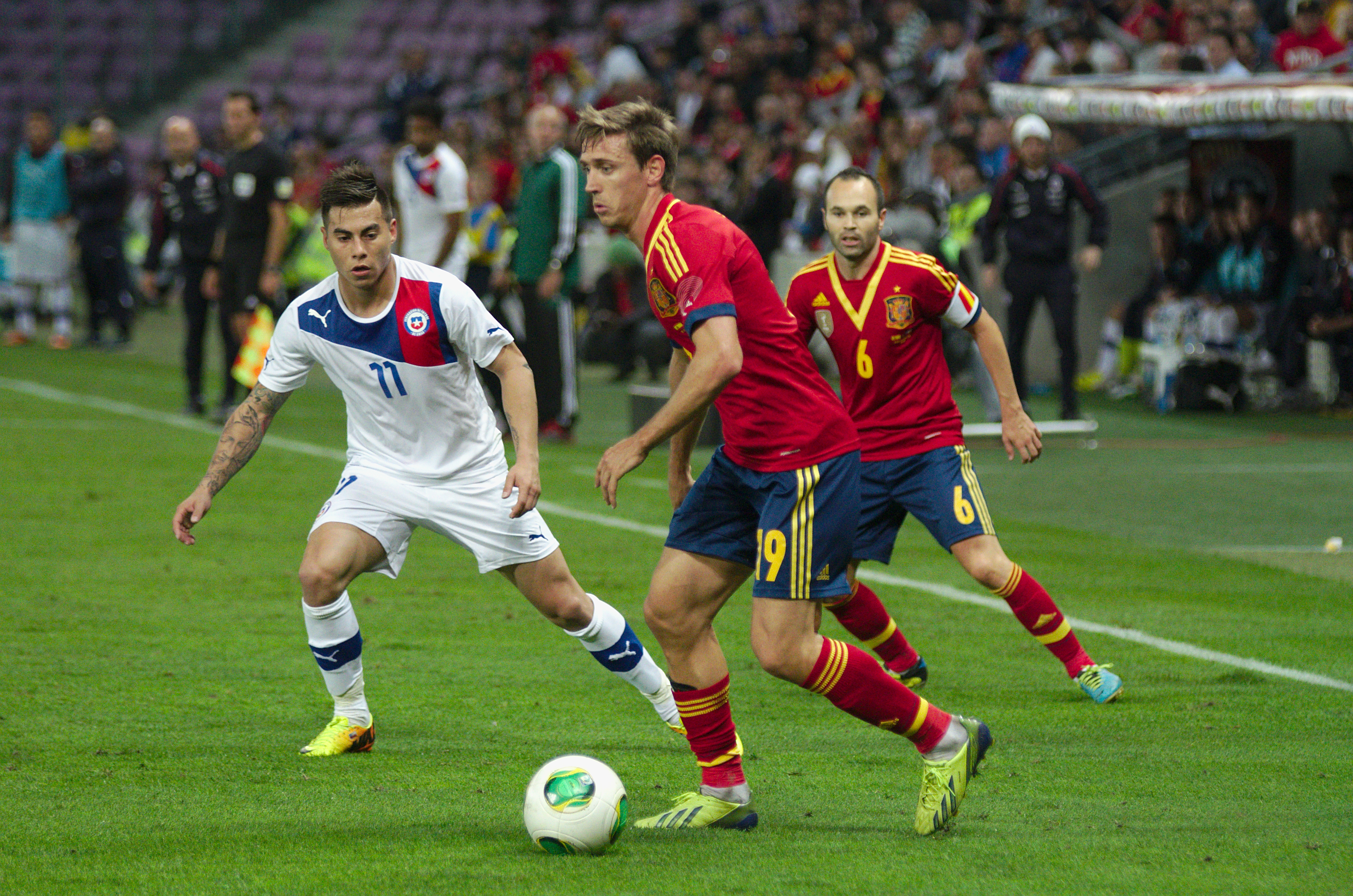
Monreal taking on Chile's Eduardo Vargas in a 2013 friendly

In 2007, Monreal earned his first call for the Spain under-21 team. He started all their matches in the 2009 UEFA European Championship, in an eventual group-stage exit.

On 6 August 2009, Monreal was called up to the senior side for the first time, for an exhibition game with Macedonia. He played the last 15 minutes for Joan Capdevila in a 3–2 away win; on 7 September 2010, in the nation's second game after they won the 2010 FIFA World Cup in South Africa, he featured the entire 4–1 friendly loss to Argentina.

Monreal was a member of Spain's squad which reached the final of the 2013 FIFA Confederations Cup in Brazil, although he was second-choice left-back behind FC Barcelona's Jordi Alba. He started in the last two group games, beginning with a 10–0 thrashing of Tahiti at the Maracanã where he set up a David Villa goal.

Monreal scored his only goal for Spain on 12 November 2016, contributing to a 4–0 defeat of Macedonia for the 2018 World Cup qualifiers in Granada. He was then selected by manager Julen Lopetegui for the finals in Russia.

== Style of play ==
Upon signing with Arsenal in 2013, the club's manager Arsène Wenger described Monreal as "a strong left-sided defender with good experience at both club and international level. He is a technically gifted player, a good crosser in the final third and strong in the air." Although he usually played as a defensive–minded left-back in a four-man back-line, he was also capable of playing as a centre-back or even as a left-sided defender in a back three.

== Career statistics ==
=== Club ===
Appearances and goals by club, season and competition
Club	Season	League			National cup (Note: Includes Copa del Rey, FA Cup)		League cup (Note: Includes Football League/EFL Cup)		Europe		Other		Total	
Club	Season	Division	Apps	Goals	Apps	Goals	Apps	Goals	Apps	Goals	Apps	Goals	Apps	Goals
Osasuna B	2004–05	Segunda División B	1	0	0	0	—		—		—		1	0
Osasuna B	2005–06	Segunda División B	35	3	0	0	—		—		—		35	3
Osasuna B	Total		36	3	0	0	—		0	0	—		36	3
Osasuna	2006–07	La Liga	10	0	3	0	—		6 (Note: Appearances in UEFA Champions League)	0	—		19	0
Osasuna	2007–08	La Liga	27	1	0	0	—		—		—		27	1
Osasuna	2008–09	La Liga	28	0	1	0	—		—		—		29	0
Osasuna	2009–10	La Liga	31	1	6	0	—		—		—		37	1
Osasuna	2010–11	La Liga	31	1	1	0	—		—		—		32	1
Osasuna	Total		127	3	11	0	—		6	0	—		144	3
Málaga	2011–12	La Liga	31	0	2	0	—		—		—		33	0
Málaga	2012–13	La Liga	14	1	3	0	—		4	0	—		21	1
Málaga	Total		45	1	5	0	—		4	0	—		54	1
Arsenal	2012–13	Premier League	10	1	1	0	—		—		—		11	1
Arsenal	2013–14	Premier League	23	0	3	0	2	0	8	0	—		36	0
Arsenal	2014–15	Premier League	28	0	4	1	0	0	6	0	1 (Note: Appearance in FA Community Shield)	0	39	1
Arsenal	2015–16	Premier League	37	0	1	0	0	0	6	0	1	0	45	0
Arsenal	2016–17	Premier League	36	0	4	1	0	0	3	0	—		43	1
Arsenal	2017–18	Premier League	28	5	0	0	2	0	7 (Note: Appearances in UEFA Europa League)	1	1	0	38	6
Arsenal	2018–19	Premier League	22	1	0	0	2	0	12	0	—		36	1
Arsenal	2019–20	Premier League	3	0	0	0	0	0	0	0	—		3	0
Arsenal	Total		187	7	13	2	6	0	42	1	3	0	251	10
Real Sociedad	2019–20	La Liga	29	2	5 (Note: Includes appearance in 2020 Copa del Rey final (played in 2021))	0	—		—		—		34	2
Real Sociedad	2020–21	La Liga	26	1	1	0	—		7	1	1 (Note: Appearance in Supercopa de España)	0	35	2
Real Sociedad	2021–22	La Liga	0	0	0	0	—		0	0	—		0	0
Real Sociedad	Total		55	3	6	0	—		7	1	1	0	69	4
Career total			450	17	35	2	6	0	59	2	4	0	554	21

=== International ===
National team	Year	Apps	Goals
Spain	2009	2	0
Spain	2010	2	0
Spain	2011	1	0
Spain	2012	4	0
Spain	2013	7	0
Spain	2014	0	0
Spain	2015	0	0
Spain	2016	2	1
Spain	2017	3	0
Spain	2018	1	0
Total		22	1

Spain score listed first, score column indicates score after each Monreal goal.

List of international goals scored by Nacho Monreal
No.	Date	Venue	Opponent	Score	Result	Competition
1	12 November 2016	Nuevo Los Cármenes, Granada, Spain	Macedonia	3–0	4–0	2018 FIFA World Cup qualification

== Honours ==
Arsenal

- FA Cup: 2013–14, 2014–15, 2016–17
- FA Community Shield: 2014, 2015, 2017
- EFL Cup runner-up: 2017–18
- UEFA Europa League runner-up: 2018–19

Real Sociedad

- Copa del Rey: 2019–20

Spain

- FIFA Confederations Cup runner-up: 2013

Individual

- Professional Footballers' Association Fans' Player of the Month: October 2017
