= 2015 FA Community Shield =

- The match programme cover
Arsenal	Chelsea
1	0
- Date: 2 August 2015
- Venue: Wembley Stadium, London
- Man of the Match: Alex Oxlade-Chamberlain (Arsenal)
- Referee: Anthony Taylor (Cheshire)
- Attendance: 85,437
- Weather: Clear; 25 °C (77 °F)

The 2015 FA Community Shield (also known as The FA Community Shield supported by McDonald's for sponsorship reasons) was the 93rd FA Community Shield, an annual English football match played between the winners of the previous season's Premier League and FA Cup. The match was contested by Arsenal, the 2014–15 FA Cup winners, and Chelsea, champions of the 2014–15 Premier League. It was held at Wembley Stadium on 2 August 2015. Watched by a crowd of 85,437 and a television audience of over a million, Arsenal won the match 1–0 to retain the Shield, having also won it in 2014.

This was Arsenal's 21st Shield appearance and Chelsea's 11th. Petr Čech made his competitive debut for Arsenal against his former team, while captain Mikel Arteta and striker Olivier Giroud were named as substitutes. Gary Cahill was passed fit to start for Chelsea alongside captain John Terry, and Loïc Rémy started up-front as Diego Costa was absent.

The only goal of the match came near the midway point of the first half; Alex Oxlade-Chamberlain collected a pass from Theo Walcott from the right and scored past Thibaut Courtois. Both managers did not shake hands after the game, which drew media attention. Arsenal's victory was their first against Chelsea in over three years and manager Arsène Wenger's first over José Mourinho in 14 attempts.

== Background and pre-match ==
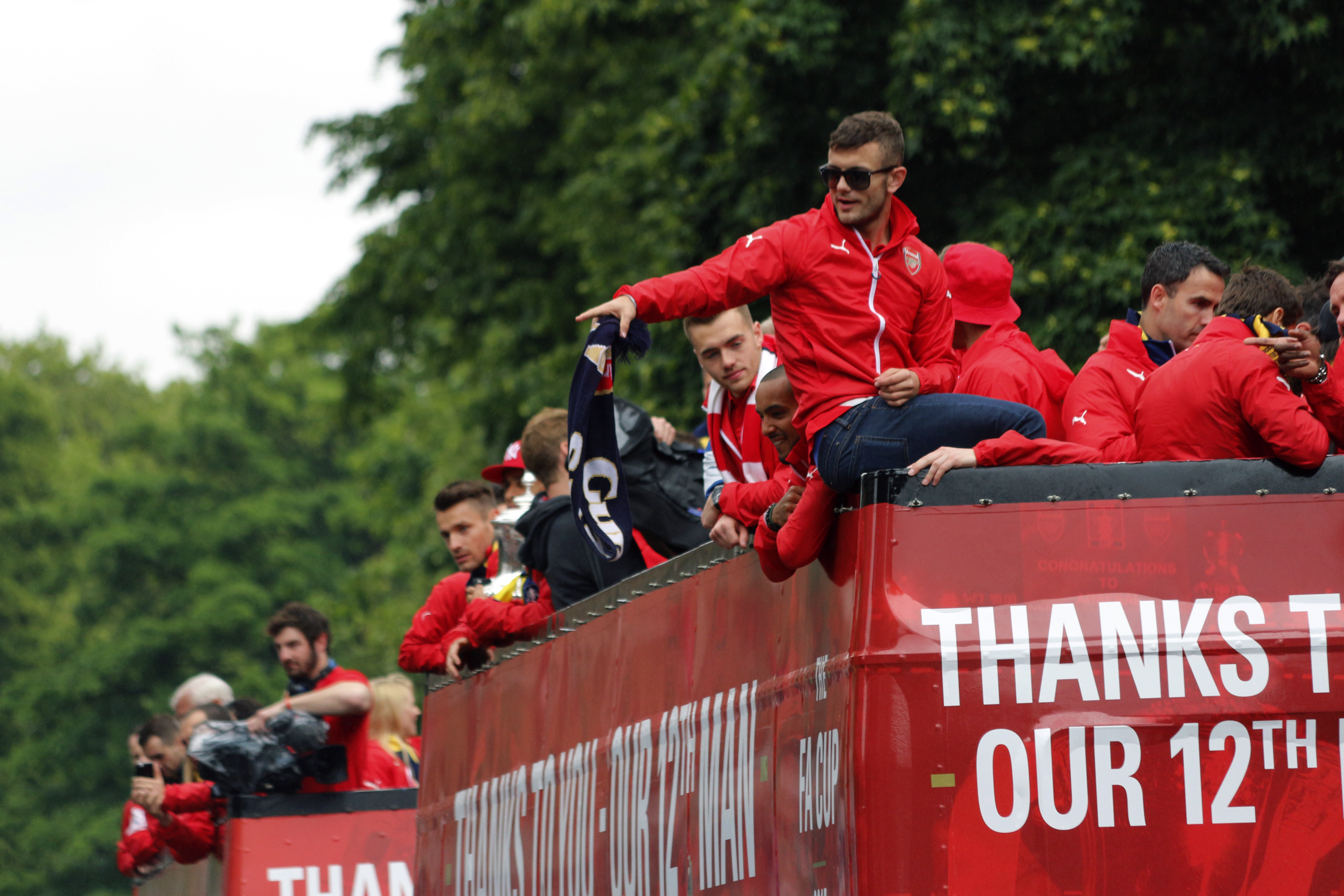
Arsenal's victory parade after winning the 2015 FA Cup final, which qualified them for the Community Shield.

The FA Community Shield was founded in 1908 as a successor to the Sheriff of London Charity Shield, and began as a contest between the respective champions of the Football League and Southern League, although in 1913 it was played between an Amateurs XI and a Professionals XI. In 1921, it was played by the league champions of the top division (Note: The Premier League replaced the Football League First Division at the top of the English football pyramid after its inception in 1992.) and FA Cup winners for the first time.

Chelsea qualified for the 2015 FA Community Shield as winners of the 2014–15 Premier League. It was the club's fourth league title in ten years and third under the management of José Mourinho. The other Community Shield place went to Arsenal, who defeated Aston Villa by four goals to win the 2015 FA Cup final and retain the trophy. In doing so, Arsenal had overtaken Manchester United to become the most successful club in the competition's history, with 12 titles.

Chelsea made their eleventh appearance in the Community Shield; prior to this they won four (1970, 2000, 2005, 2009) and lost six, most recently in 2012 against Manchester City. By contrast, Arsenal made their 21st Community Shield appearance, and won 13, including one shared in 1991. They went into the match as holders of the Shield, having defeated Manchester City a year earlier. Both clubs had only once met before in the Shield, when Chelsea won by two goals to one in 2005. Arsenal had failed to beat Chelsea in all competitions since 2011, and Mourinho was undefeated against his opponent Arsène Wenger in 13 matches. Mourinho told reporters a winless run was something he would not tolerate: “I would try to answer, not because of a mental block but because I would want to try to find solutions to help my team to do it – try to find a different way, try to find the reasons why it goes all the time against my team." He also attempted to play down the significance of the match, given Arsenal had won the previous year's contest but finished third in the league.

The match was televised live in the United Kingdom on BT Sport 2; the network obtained rights to the Community Shield in July 2013 and were into their second year of a deal with the BBC and the FA. The game was also the inaugural broadcast of BT Sport's 4K ultra HD feed.

== Match ==
=== Team selection ===
Chelsea were predicted to line up in a 4–2–3–1 formation, with Willian and Eden Hazard as wide men. Mourinho doubted the fitness of Diego Costa and Gary Cahill going into the match – the former aggravated his hamstring during a pre-season game against Barcelona. Arsenal were expected to line up similarly to Chelsea, with Walcott furthest forward and Mesut Özil in his preferred position as playmaker. Midfielder Jack Wilshere was ruled out of selection, having sustained an ankle injury during training. Arsenal's top scorer of the previous season, Alexis Sánchez, was rested, having won the 2015 Copa América with Chile earlier in the summer. The teamsheets showed Loïc Rémy starting the match for Chelsea up front and Cesc Fàbregas partnering Matic in midfield. As expected Petr Čech started in goal for Arsenal; the goalkeeper moved from Chelsea in search of first-team football.

=== Summary ===
==== First half ====
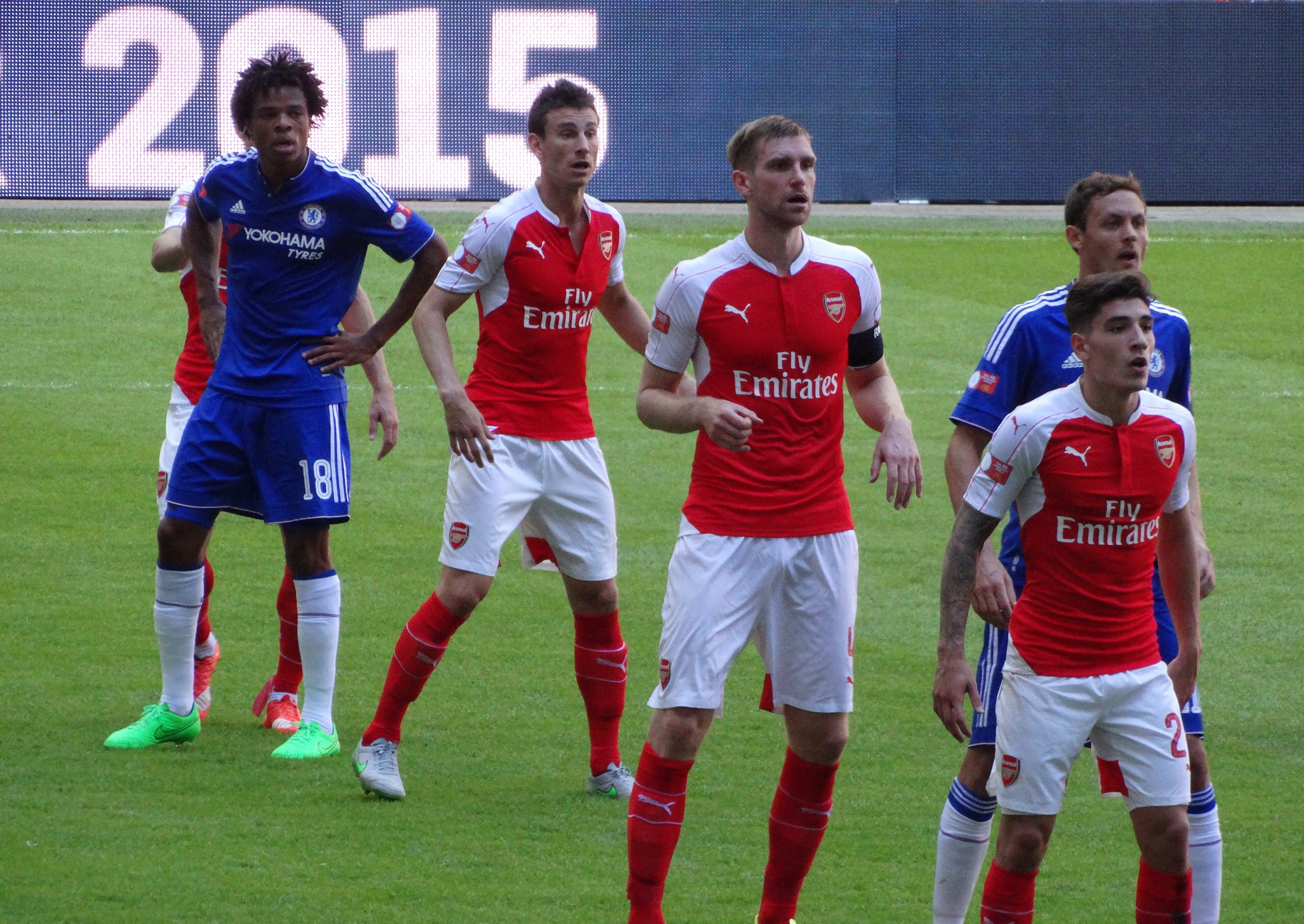
Chelsea's Loïc Rémy and Nemanja Matić and the Arsenal defence

Chelsea, in their usual home strip of blue, kicked off the match and immediately lost possession when Walcott dispossessed Matic. Walcott sent the ball to Alex Oxlade-Chamberlain, whose cross on the right forced a punch from Thibaut Courtois. Francis Coquelin conceded a free kick in the sixth minute having fouled Willian inside Chelsea's half, though nothing came of the set piece. Fàbregas went down under the challenge of Per Mertesacker in Arsenal's penalty area soon afterwards, but his appeal for a penalty kick was turned down by referee Anthony Taylor and play resumed. Chelsea, having settled the slower of the two teams, began to dominate ball possession and won two early corners, both of which were easily dealt with. In the 17th minute, Nacho Monreal's charge forward was stopped by Cahill; the Chelsea defender in the process of making that challenge had suffered a nose bleed. A free kick for Arsenal presented a chance for Walcott to score, but his header goalwards was saved.

Arsenal scored the game's only goal in the 24th minute; set-up by Walcott, Oxlade-Chamberlain managed to cut inside César Azpilicueta on the right and shoot the ball into the top-left corner of Courtois's net. It was the first goal Chelsea had conceded against Arsenal in 506 minutes. Most of the action in the first half was conducted in a congested midfield, with Fàbregas attempting to sedate the rhythm and the Arsenal midfielders forcing their opponents to play narrow. This favoured Arsenal, who had space to counter-attack had Chelsea lost the ball. Ramires nearly levelled the scoreline in the 33rd minute, but his curling effort failed to creep into the bottom right-hand corner. Ramires then missed another chance, heading the ball high and over the Arsenal goal after good work by Rémy. Arsenal created another chance to score four minutes before the break, when Oxlade-Chamberlain's cross found Monreal, who under pressure from Ivanovic headed over. Rémy, often a lone figure upfront, was ruled offside late on.

==== Second half ====
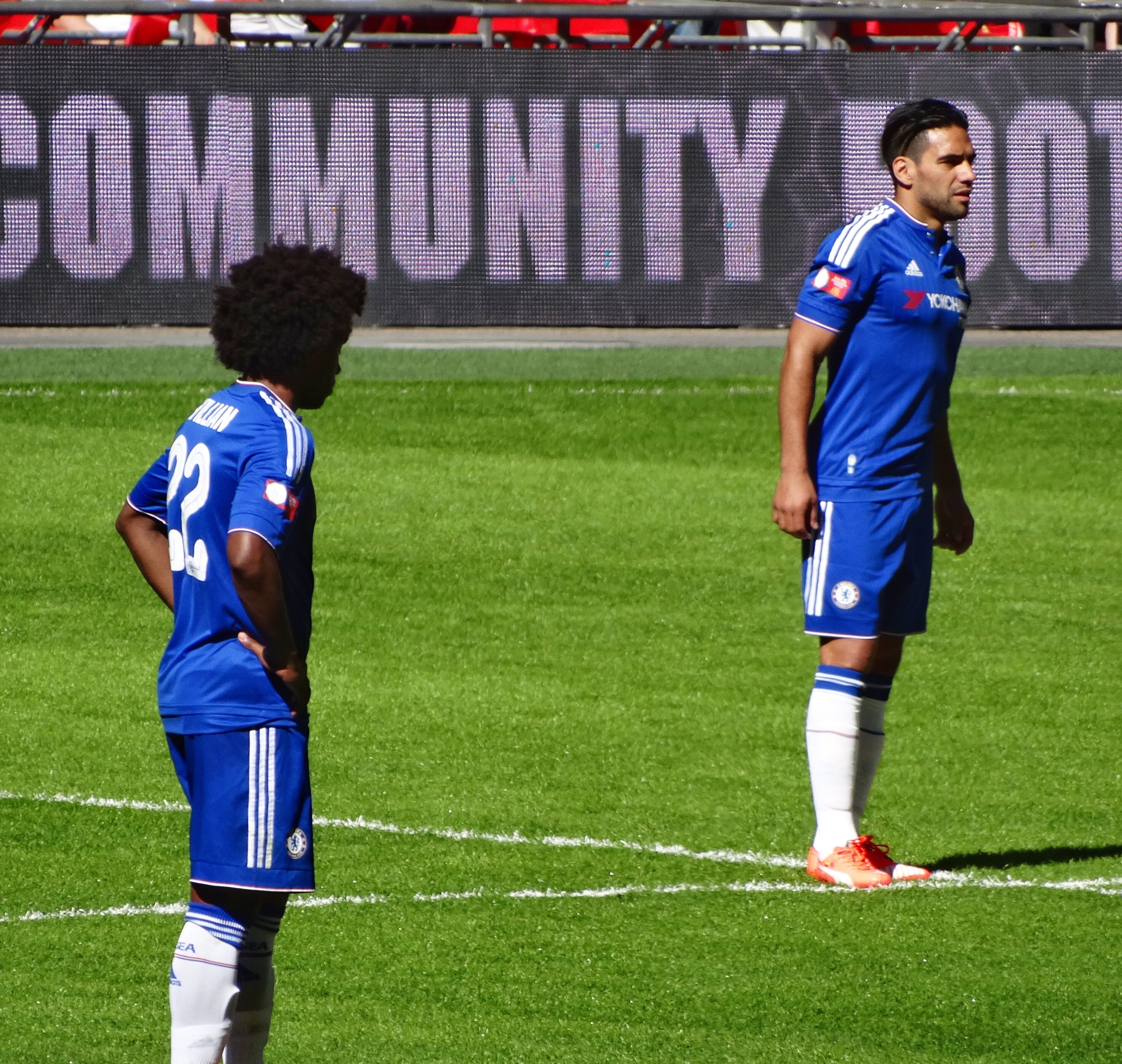
Chelsea's Willian (left) and Radamel Falcao, who made his professional debut for the club.

Radamel Falcao replaced Rémy after the break and his long-range shot in the 48th minute was blocked. Although Chelsea started the half well, it was Arsenal who fashioned the notable chances before the hour mark. In the 50th minute Santi Cazorla attempted to thread the ball through Chelsea's defence for Walcott to reach but his pass was cleared. Two minutes later Coquelin over-hit his pass which was directed to Özil, who roamed freely. Chelsea made another change, this time Oscar in place of Ramires in the 53rd minute. Seven minutes later Chelsea came close to scoring when Eden Hazard managed to evade his markers, but through on goal failed to get his shot on target, hitting over. Azpilicueta was shown the game's first yellow card for pulling Oxlade-Chamberlain back; Mourinho made the decision to substitute him with Kurt Zouma in the 69th minute. Giroud came on for Walcott moments before, and immediately was involved in the action, shooting high and then from long range.

Coquelin then was booked for his foul on Oscar, which earned Chelsea a free kick. Oscar's attempt was saved by Čech, who fisted the ball round the post. Chelsea continued to attack, though Arsenal withstood their pressure. John Terry rose highest from a corner in the 74th minute and headed the ball in Zouma's direction, which eventually was caught by Čech. Hazard's shot was blocked in the 79th minute and Oscar then spurned a chance, with Falcao unable to create something from it. In an effort to find an equaliser with ten minutes of normal time remaining, Mourinho brought on Moses in place of Terry and deployed a three-man defence. It nearly presented Arsenal the chance to score their second of the match, but for Cazorla to have his effort blocked and Aaron Ramsey on the rebound shooting wide.

=== Details ===
2 August 2015
15:00 BST

Arsenal	1–0	Chelsea
Oxlade-Chamberlain 24'	Report

Wembley Stadium, London
Attendance: 85,437
Referee: Anthony Taylor (Cheshire)

Arsenal	Chelsea

GK	33	(Czech Republic) Petr Čech
RB	24	(Spain) Héctor Bellerín
CB	4	(Germany) Per Mertesacker (c)
CB	6	(France) Laurent Koscielny
LB	18	(Spain) Nacho Monreal
CM	34	(France) Francis Coquelin	(yellow card) 67'
CM	19	(Spain) Santi Cazorla
RW	16	(Wales) Aaron Ramsey
AM	11	(Germany) Mesut Özil		(substituted off) 82'
LW	15	(England) Alex Oxlade-Chamberlain		(substituted off) 77'
CF	14	(England) Theo Walcott		(substituted off) 66'
Substitutes:
GK	26	(Argentina) Emiliano Martínez
DF	2	(France) Mathieu Debuchy
DF	3	(England) Kieran Gibbs		(substituted on) 82'
DF	5	(Brazil) Gabriel
MF	8	(Spain) Mikel Arteta		(substituted on) 77'
FW	12	(France) Olivier Giroud		(substituted on) 66'
FW	45	(Nigeria) Alex Iwobi
Manager:
(France) Arsène Wenger

GK	13	(Belgium) Thibaut Courtois
RB	2	(Serbia) Branislav Ivanović
CB	24	(England) Gary Cahill
CB	26	(England) John Terry (c)		(substituted off) 82'
LB	28	(Spain) César Azpilicueta	(yellow card) 65'	(substituted off) 69'
CM	21	(Serbia) Nemanja Matić
CM	4	(Spain) Cesc Fàbregas
RW	7	(Brazil) Ramires		(substituted off) 54'
AM	22	(Brazil) Willian
LW	10	(Belgium) Eden Hazard
CF	18	(France) Loïc Rémy		(substituted off) 46'
Substitutes:
GK	1	(Bosnia and Herzegovina) Asmir Begović
DF	5	(France) Kurt Zouma		(substituted on) 69'
MF	8	(Brazil) Oscar		(substituted on) 54'
MF	11	(Colombia) Juan Cuadrado
MF	12	(Nigeria) John Obi Mikel
MF	20	(Nigeria) Victor Moses		(substituted on) 82'
FW	9	(Colombia) Radamel Falcao		(substituted on) 46'
Manager:
(Portugal) José Mourinho

Match officials:

- Assistant referees:
  - Gary Beswick
  - John Brooks
- Fourth official: Roger East (Wiltshire)

Match rules

- 90 minutes
- Penalty shoot-out if scores still level
- Seven named substitutes, of which six may be used

=== Statistics ===
Statistic	Arsenal	Chelsea
Goals scored	1	0
Possession	43.4%	56.6%
Shots on target	5	2
Shots off target	6	12
Corner kicks	4	4
Fouls	12	11
Interceptions	21	13
Offsides	0	6
Yellow cards	1	1
Red cards	0	0

== Post-match ==
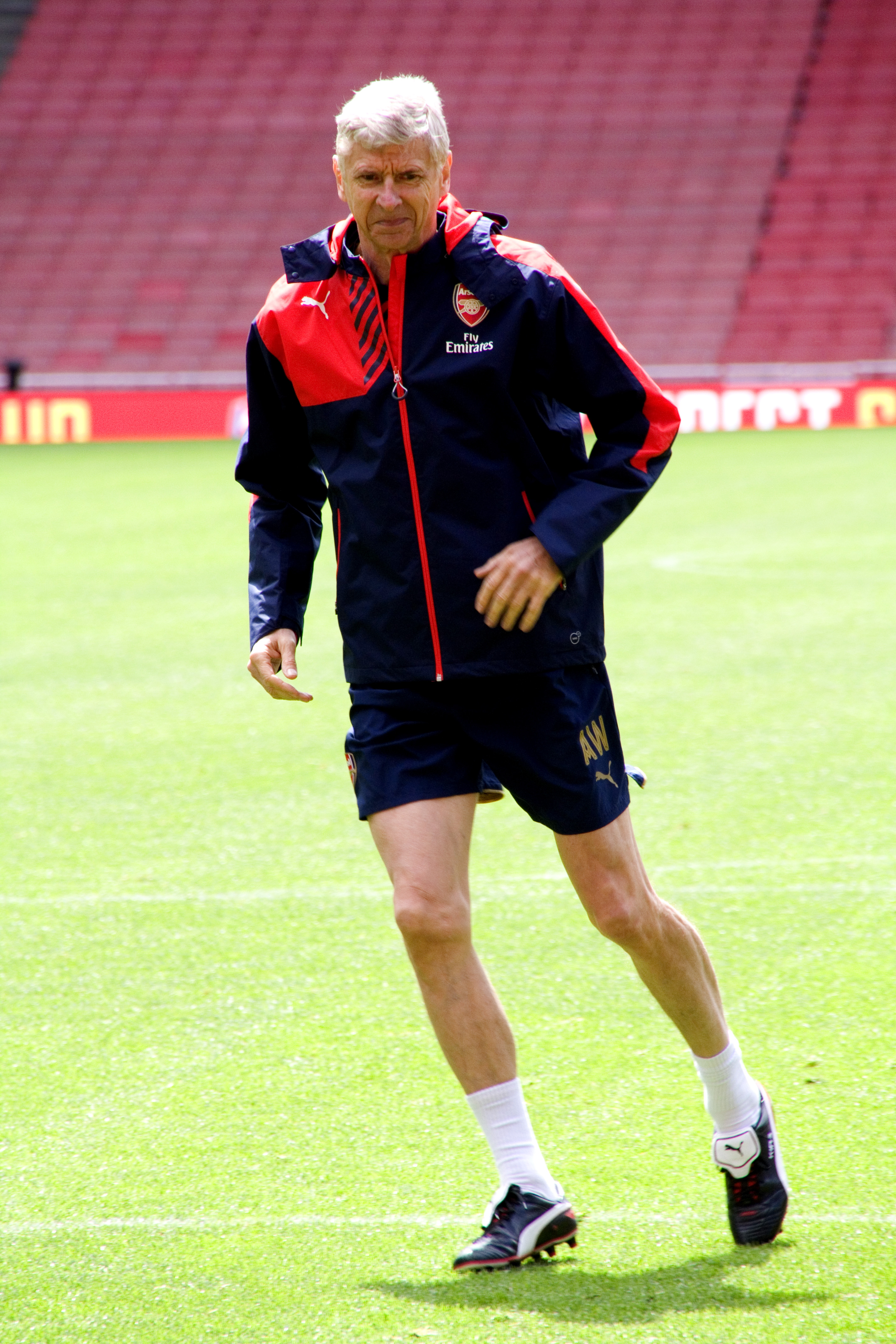
Wenger won his sixth Community Shield as Arsenal manager

Wenger and Mourinho did not shake hands after the final whistle; Mourinho congratulated Arsenal's players as they descended the Wembley steps upon lifting the Shield, but the Arsenal manager appeared to avoid his Chelsea counterpart after he had collected his winner's medal.

In a post-match interview, Mourinho credited Arsenal's defensive approach and organisation, but felt "the best team lost", arguing that Chelsea created more chances and showed more initiative. He went on to suggest that Arsenal betrayed their attacking philosophy, choosing to adopt a counterattacking approach. Although Wenger agreed his team were set-up cautiously, he denied they abandoned their playing style: "...we defend our game on togetherness and solidarity and on defending well and attacking well." The Arsenal manager felt victory against Chelsea acted as a physiological boost for his players going into the new season, but was indifferent to his own record of beating Mourinho for the first time.

Terry was disappointed with the result, observing "No matter if it’s a friendly or a Community Shield, it’s a trophy at the end of the day," but sought positives – focusing on how the players' fitness levels were rising in time for the new season. Mertesacker was delighted with his team's performance, describing it as the peak of their pre-season preparations.

Both managers criticised the quality of the pitch; Mourinho remarked that it "was a disaster... so bad and so slow." An FA spokesperson said: "We will continue to improve the quality of the pitch, which we have every confidence in. In this instance it is simply that the pitch is less mature than we would ordinarily wish given the summer concert season and the early start to the football calendar."

An average of 821,000 viewers watched the match live on BT Sport 2; the channel's coverage peaked at 1.2 million (11.5% of the audience share) from 16:40. Highlights on BBC One later that evening attracted 2.1 million viewers (17%).

== See also ==
- 2015–16 Premier League
- 2015–16 FA Cup
- Arsenal F.C.–Chelsea F.C. rivalry
