= Laurent Koscielny =

French footballer (born 1985)

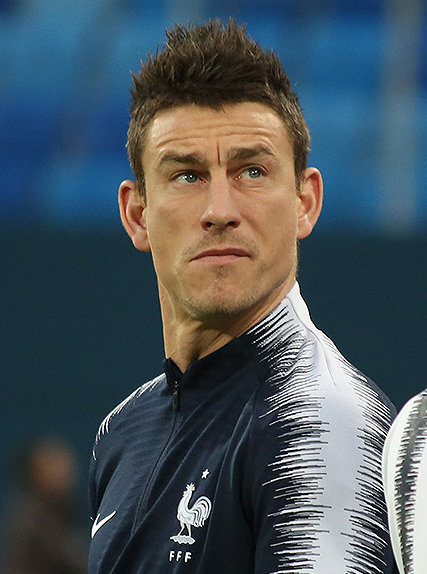
- Koscielny with France in 2018

Personal information
- Full name: Laurent Koscielny
- Date of birth: 10 September 1985 (age 41)
- Place of birth: Tulle, Corrèze, France
- Height: 1.86 m (6 ft 1 in)
- Position: Centre-back

Team information
- Current team: Lorient (sporting director)

Youth career
- 1993–1995: Tulle Corrèze
- 1995–1997: Brive
- 1997–1998: Tulle Corrèze
- 1998–2002: Brive
- 2002–2003: Limoges
- 2003–2004: Guingamp

Senior career*
Years	Team	Apps	(Gls)
2004–2007	Guingamp	41	(0)
2007–2009	Tours	67	(6)
2009–2010	Lorient	35	(3)
2010–2019	Arsenal	255	(22)
2019–2022	Bordeaux	62	(0)
Total		460	(31)

International career
2011–2018	France	51	(1)

Managerial career
- 2023–2024: Lorient (youth coach)
Medal record
Men's football
Representing France
UEFA European Championship
Runner-up	2016 France
- * Club domestic league appearances and goals

Laurent Koscielny (born 10 September 1985) is a French former professional footballer who played as a centre back. He is currently the sporting director of Ligue 1 club Lorient.

Born in Tulle, Koscielny began his football career playing for a host of youth clubs before moving to Guingamp in 2003, where he quickly progressed through the youth ranks, making his professional debut the following season. After becoming frustrated at being played out of position as a right back, he joined Tours for an undisclosed fee, quickly establishing himself as the team's star player in his desired position, ultimately aiding in the club's promotion into Ligue 1, while also being named in the Ligue 2 Team of the Season. Koscielny continued his impressive performances following a €1.7 million transfer to fellow French outfit Lorient in 2009, receiving multiple plaudits for his performances, largely cultivating a reputation as a clever, agile, ball-playing defender. His achievements and footballing potential attracted Arsenal, ultimately moving to the Premier League side for a fee of £8.45 million the following season.

Following his arrival in England, Koscielny was regarded as one of the best players in his position in the Premier League. He had established himself as a core component in the Arsenal first team, as well as contributing with a host of individual performances, including aiding in ending the club's nine-year trophy drought, scoring a crucial equalizer en route to winning the FA Cup in 2014. He was also crucial in further club successes that followed, winning another FA Cup and the FA Community Shield twice.

Despite qualifying to represent Poland, Koscielny instead decided to represent France, and first appeared up for the national team against Brazil in February 2011. He became a regular starter for the nation in every major tournament that they have appeared in, including UEFA Euro 2012 and the 2014 FIFA World Cup, while also leading France to the final of UEFA Euro 2016, which they lost to Portugal. He scored his first international goal in a friendly match against Scotland in 2016, and amassed fifty-one appearances for the national side. He retired from international football in 2018.

== Club career ==
=== Early career ===
Koscielny was born in Tulle, Corrèze. He began his career at Guingamp in 2004, a team that had produced such talents as Didier Drogba and Florent Malouda. Three years later, Koscielny was forced to drop down to the French third tier. He made 47 appearances for Guingamp, between 2004 and 2007, mostly as a right fullback.

In 2007, Koscielny joined Tours FC, deciding that he wanted a chance at centre back. He showed remarkable improvement in aerial ability and positional awareness that limited him to just three yellow cards. During the 2008–09 season, Koscielny made 34 Ligue 2 appearances, scoring 5 goals from defence, and was named in the division's best XI at the end of the season.

=== Lorient ===
On 16 June 2009, newly promoted Ligue 1 side FC Lorient signed Koscielny on a four-year contract for around €1.7 million. He established himself as a starter and played in his preferred centre-back position. Over one season at the club, he scored 3 goals in 35 appearances. On 7 March 2010 Koscielny tapped in his first Ligue 1 goal against Olympique Marseille at Stade Vélodrome in the 65th minute in a 1–1 draw. Koscielny became a fan favourite when he scored his second goal with a header deep in injury time against Montpellier in a 2–2 draw after a cross from Olivier Monterrubio.

He scored another against Bordeaux after 11 minutes. However, he received a red card 15 minutes later for a foul in the penalty area against his future Arsenal teammate Marouane Chamakh. Koscielny helped Lorient to finish the campaign in 7th place; its best finish in Ligue 1. An impressive season culminated in reports from French daily Ouest-France that the defender was training with the Arsenal reserves ahead of an official announcement. On 6 July 2010, Koscielny agreed personal terms with Arsenal. Arsenal's initial offer for Koscielny was believed to be in the region of £4 million, while they were then prepared to do a deal that would also involve youngster Francis Coquelin moving on loan in the opposite direction, which Lorient rejected. During the summer transfer window of 2010 reports began to emerge in late June that a deal had been reached to bring Koscielny to Arsenal for a reported sum of £8.45 million.

=== Arsenal ===
==== 2010–11 season ====
"I don't believe any French player would have refused to come and play for Arsenal. It took me four years to go from the bench of Ligue 2 to Arsenal so it is a great achievement. I have been on the crest of a wave for the last few years. But it is just the beginning; I haven't proved anything yet. Arsenal is a reference for football."

— Laurent Koscielny

Arsenal confirmed the signing on 7 July 2010 and Koscielny was handed the club's number 6 shirt, previously worn by Philippe Senderos, who had moved to Fulham earlier in the summer. Wenger explained he bought Koscielny due to the fact he added height to the team and Arsenal were low on centre backs. Koscielny made his debut against Barnet in a pre-season friendly in July 2010. One month later in his competitive debut against Liverpool at Anfield, he was sent off in the 94th minute for a second bookable offence. Both of his yellow cards were shown beyond 90 minutes. The game ended in a 1–1 draw with both teams having debut players sent off. He scored his first goal for Arsenal on 11 September 2010, in a 4–1 win against Bolton Wanderers.

Koscielny made his debut in European competition on 15 September 2010, when he partnered Sébastien Squillaci in a 6–0 win over Braga at the Emirates Stadium. Koscielny was praised for performances against Sunderland and made a brilliant tackle against Tottenham Hotspur to stop Aaron Lennon from scoring during their Football League Cup tie. On 27 October, he blocked a shot off the line and provided an assist to Theo Walcott against Newcastle United in the fourth round of the League Cup, where Arsenal went on to win the match 4–0 at St James' Park. Koscielny was given a straight red card in Arsenal's 0–1 loss at home against Newcastle United on 7 November 2010. This was his second sending off of the season.

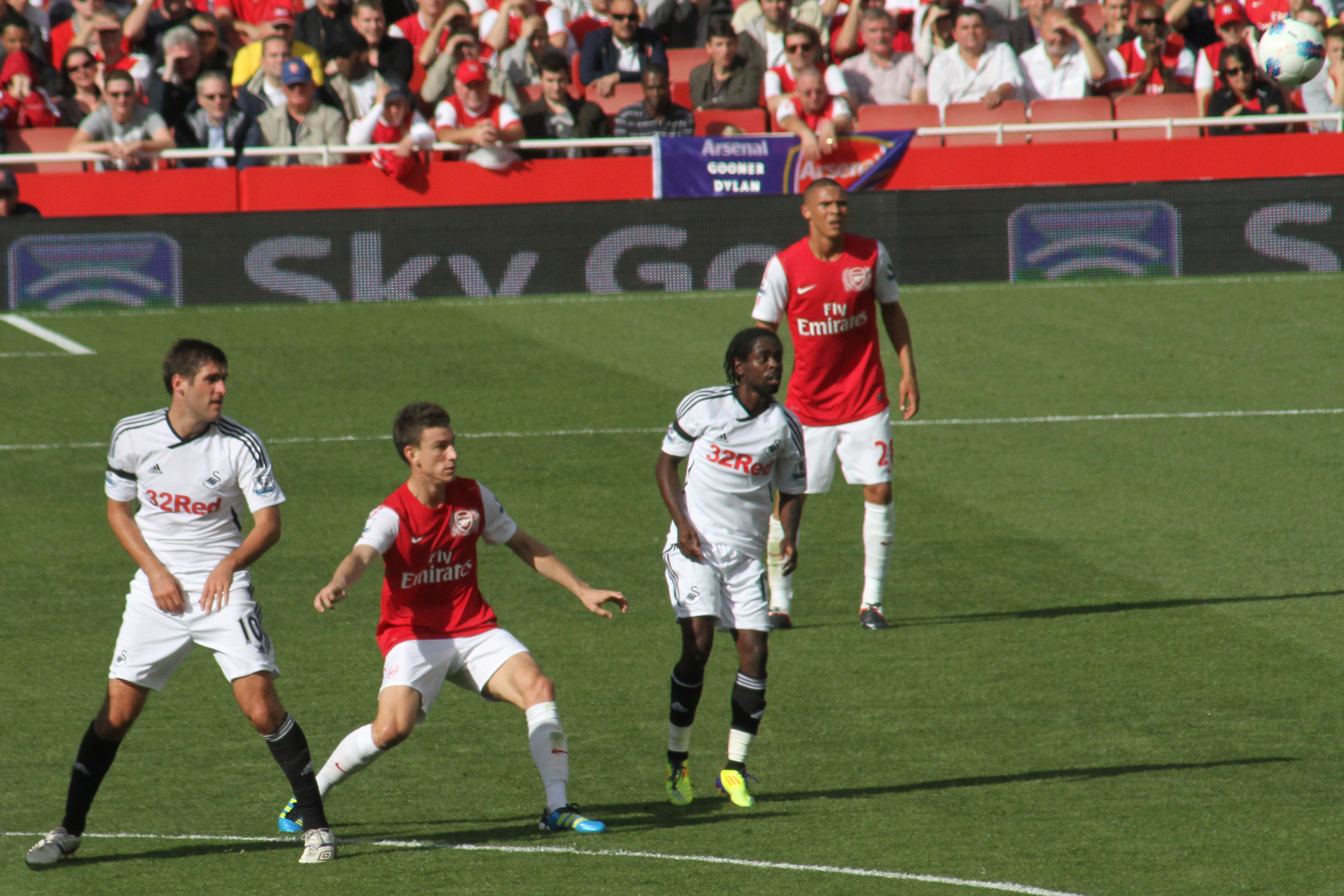
Koscielny playing for Arsenal on 10 September 2011 against Swansea City

On 25 January 2011, Koscielny scored the second goal in the 3–0 win over Ipswich Town in the League Cup semi-final second leg win at the Emirates Stadium. Throughout January 2011, Koscielny and Johan Djourou were a part of a defence that did not concede a goal in the Premier League. On 1 February, he scored his third goal of the season, which proved to be the winner in a 2–1 turn around victory over Everton. Koscielny had arguably his best performance to date for Arsenal in the first leg of the Champions League round of 16 match against Barcelona. The match ended in a 2–1 home win for Arsenal. Koscielny's performances were applauded and praised in many media reports of the game. Former Arsenal defender, Martin Keown, said his performance was "impressive" and "magnificent throughout". On 27 February, in the last minute of the 2011 Football League Cup Final, Koscielny was involved in a mix-up with his goalkeeper Wojciech Szczęsny, which resulted in Birmingham City striker Obafemi Martins scoring the winning goal.

==== 2011–12 season ====
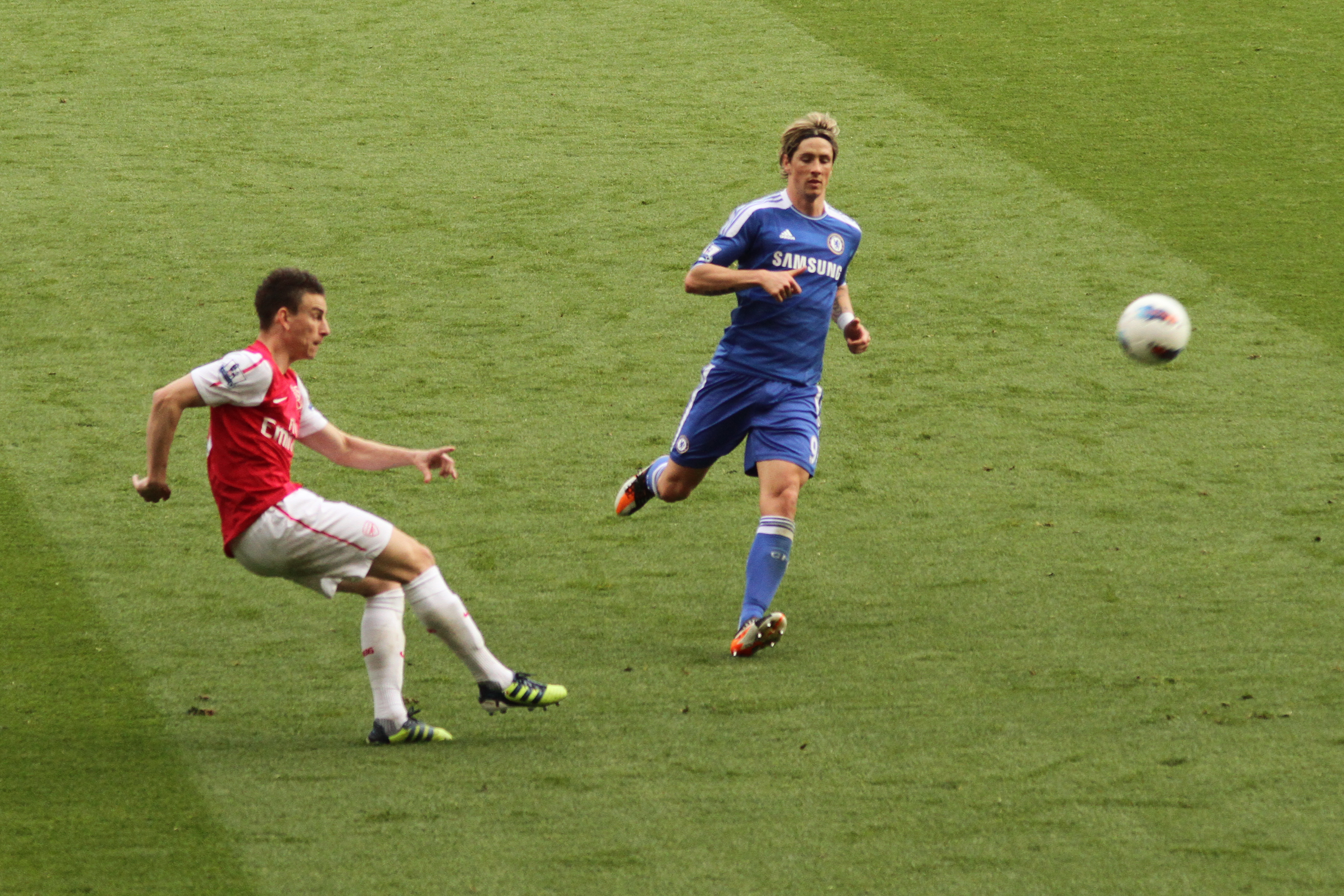
Koscielny and Fernando Torres in a Premier League match on 21 April 2012

Koscielny started the 2011–12 season alongside Thomas Vermaelen in central defence. Koscielny was injured and taken off the pitch 10 minutes into a 2–0 home loss to Liverpool on 20 August 2011. However, he returned to the starting line-up Arsenal's biggest ever Premier League defeat, losing 8–2 to Manchester United at Old Trafford. On 17 September, Koscielny scored an own goal as Arsenal lost 4–3 to Blackburn Rovers in the Premier League. He went on to be named man of the match away at Olympique Marseille in the Champions League, where Arsenal won 1–0 at the Stade Vélodrome, keeping their first clean sheet in a Champions League away game since 18 August 2009 against Celtic, where the Gunners had won 2–0.

On 29 October, Koscielny received praise for his solid performance in Arsenal's 5–3 away win against Chelsea. He scored his first goal of the season on 2 January 2012 in a 2–1 away defeat against Fulham. He scored his first Champions League goal against A.C. Milan in a 3–0 victory in the round of 16 second leg. On 13 May 2012, he scored the winning goal in a 3–2 victory against West Bromwich Albion to ensure that Arsenal finished third in the Premier League. He was voted as the team's fourth most important player by the fans in Arsenal's Player of the Season poll for his performances throughout the 2011–12 season.

==== 2012–13 season ====
On 24 July 2012, Koscielny signed a new long term contract with Arsenal. His first goal of the season was a late equaliser against champions Manchester City on 23 September 2012 in a match which ended 1–1. On 30 October, he scored a header from a corner in the 88th minute against Reading in the Football League Cup, helping Arsenal come back from 4–0 down to eventually win the game 7–5.

On 13 March 2013, Koscielny scored against Bayern Munich at the Allianz Arena in the UEFA Champions League Last 16. His goal put Arsenal 2–0 ahead on the night and level at 3–3 on aggregate, but they still exited the competition on the away goals rule.

On 19 May, Koscielny scored the winning goal as Arsenal beat Newcastle United 1–0 at St James' Park in their final Premier League fixture of the season to secure a fourth-placed finish and qualification to the 2013–14 UEFA Champions League play-off round.

Koscielny was voted as Arsenal's second best player of the season.

==== 2013–14 season ====
Koscielny started the 2013–14 season by conceding a penalty and getting sent off in Arsenal's 3–1 Premier League opening day defeat at home to Aston Villa. However, his partnership with Per Mertesacker saw the Gunners achieve the joint-best defensive record in the Premier League at the halfway point of the season, as the team topped the table.

On 22 February 2014, Koscielny scored his first goal of the season in a 4–1 defeat of Sunderland. In the team's penultimate home match, Koscielny scored his second goal of the season in a 3–0 win against Newcastle United.

On 9 May 2014, Koscielny signed a new long-term contract with Arsenal.

On 17 May, Koscielny scored Arsenal's equalising goal as the team came from 2–0 down to defeat Hull City 3–2 in the 2014 FA Cup Final, winning his first piece of silverware with the club.

==== 2014–15 season ====
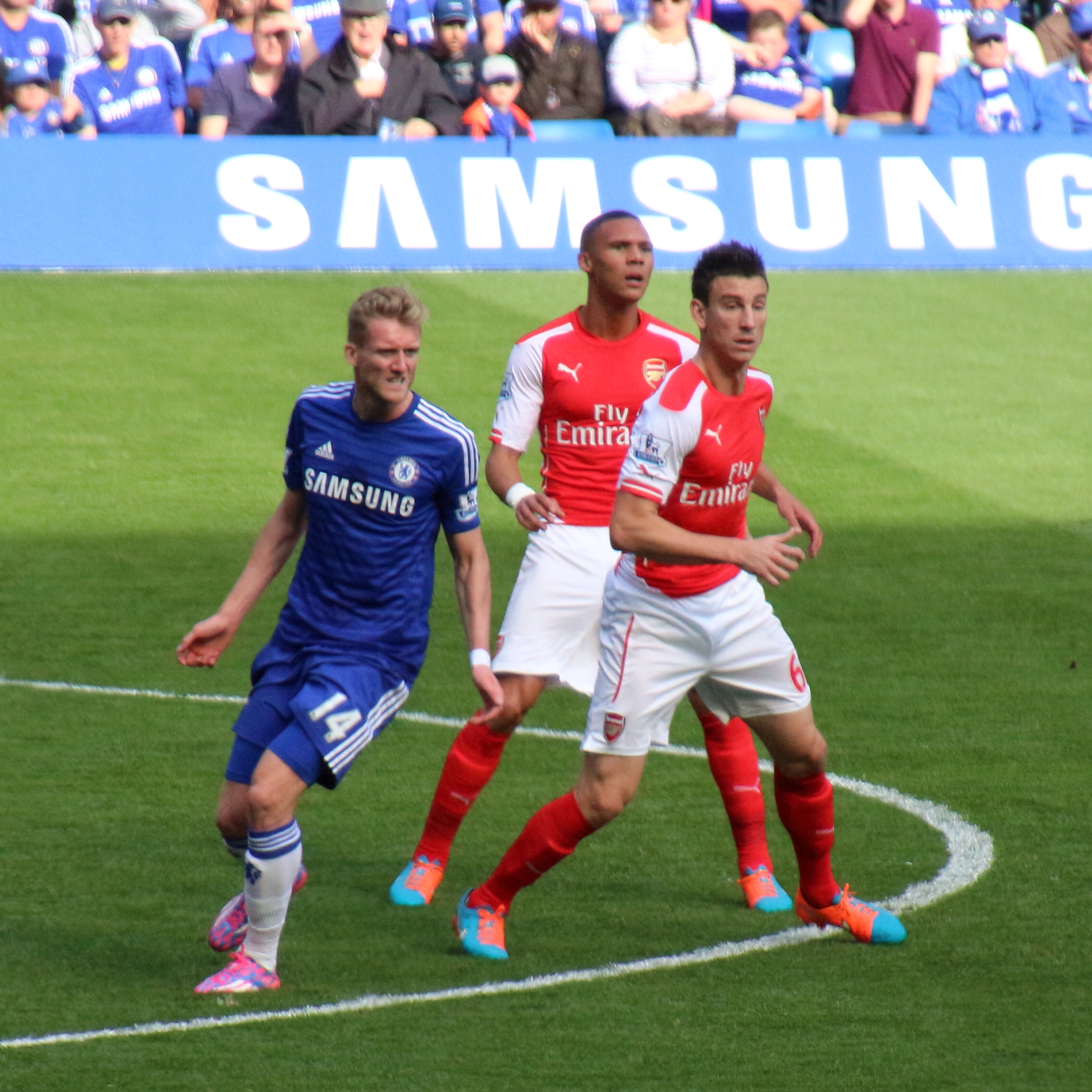
Koscielny and Kieran Gibbs playing for Arsenal in a match against Chelsea on 5 October 2014

On 16 August 2014, Koscielny opened his goal-scoring account for the season, scoring Arsenal's first goal in the 2014–15 Premier League. The goal was header from a free-kick in first half stoppage time against Crystal Palace at the Emirates Stadium. After sustaining an achilles tendon injury during the October international break, Koscielny was absent from the Arsenal team for seven weeks. On 29 November, he returned to Arsenal's starting line-up alongside Per Mertesacker in central defence, as the Gunners kept a clean sheet in a 1–0 victory against West Bromwich Albion at The Hawthorns. In the team's following fixture at home to Southampton, Koscielny helped Arsenal to record a second consecutive clean sheet and 1–0 win.

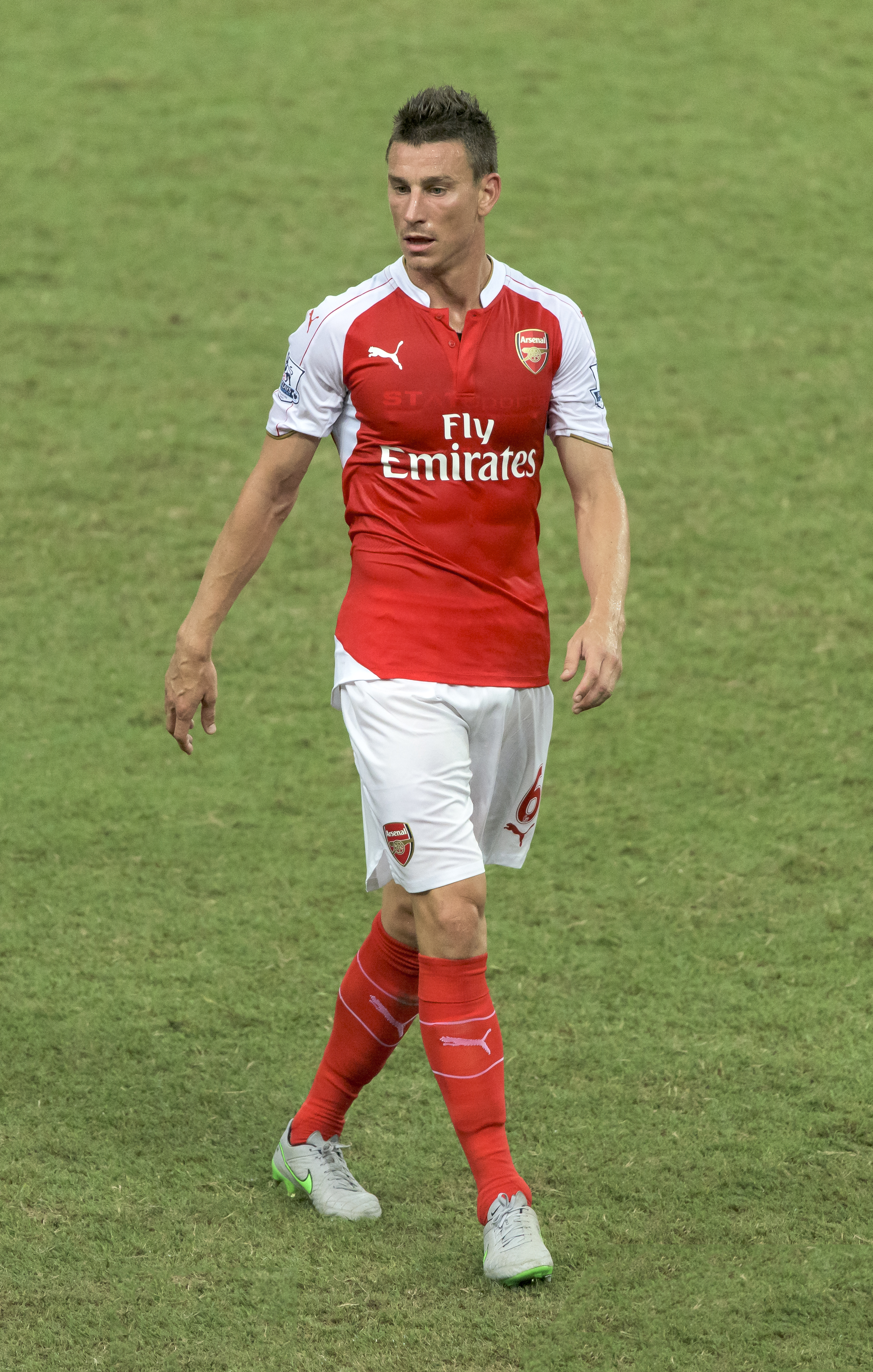
Koscielny in 2015

On 11 January 2015, Koscielny scored the first goal in a 3–0 win over Stoke City. On 18 January, he started in central defence as Arsenal shut out defending champions Manchester City to win 2–0 at the City of Manchester Stadium. On 10 February, he scored the opening goal as Arsenal defeated Leicester City 2–1. On 30 May 2015, Koscielny was selected to start in the 2015 FA Cup Final, playing the full 90 minutes in a 4–0 defeat of Aston Villa at Wembley Stadium.

==== 2015–16 season ====
Koscielny started every game in the first month of the season, excluding a 0–0 draw with rivals Liverpool at Emirates Stadium, due to an injury. Koscielny played a vital part as Arsenal won 5 games out of six in October to go second in the Premier League, with Koscielny scoring in successive Premier League wins against Everton and Swansea. With manager Arsène Wenger opting to play Gabriel Paulista ahead of vice-captain Per Mertesacker, Koscielny began appearing as captain in February, due to injuries to other captains Santi Cazorla and Mikel Arteta. This ended after a 3–2 defeat to Manchester United, when Koscielny missed four games through injury, including a North London derby at White Hart Lane. He returned in a 3–1 away defeat to Barcelona in the Champions League, as Arsenal exited the competition at the round of 16 for the sixth season running. Koscielny scored his fourth of the season in a 3–3 draw with West Ham.

==== 2016–17 season ====
Koscielny started his first game of the season in a goalless draw against Leicester City. On 10 September, he was given the role of captain and scored a fine overhead kick to equalize for the Gunners in a game which they then won 2–1 against Southampton making him Arsenal's highest goal scoring defender in EPL history, with the landmark achieved on his 31st birthday. Koscielny was involved in a controversial incident at the end of Arsenal's 1–0 win over Burnley, in which Koscielny and Alex Oxlade-Chamberlain were involved in a goal which appeared to be scored from an offside position after hitting Koscielny's arm. Neither the perceived deliberate handball or offside offenses were deemed to be infringements and the goal was later correctly credited to Koscielny. On 12 January 2017, Koscielny, alongside teammates Francis Coquelin and Olivier Giroud signed a new long-term contract with Arsenal. Two days later, he made his 200th appearance for Arsenal in the Premier League on a 4–0 away victory against Swansea City.

On the last day of the 2016–17 season he received red card for a tackle on Enner Valencia of Everton. Arsenal lost an appeal and Koscielny was banned for three games, meaning he would miss the FA Cup final.

Although he was absent from the FA Cup final, Koscielny lifted the trophy alongside Per Mertesacker.

==== Later years ====
On 3 May 2018, Koscielny suffered an Achilles injury during the UEFA Europa League semi-final second leg match against Atlético Madrid, and was ruled out for at least six months.

Following the retirement of Per Mertesacker, Koscielny was made the captain of Arsenal. He made his first appearance of the season against Southampton in a 3–2 defeat. Koscielny played what proved to be his last game for Arsenal, as captain, in a 4–1 defeat to Chelsea, in the 2019 UEFA Europa League Final.

On 11 July 2019 it was reported that, with a year left on his contract, he refused to take part in the Arsenal pre-season tour of the United States and decided to stay in the UK in order to force a move to Bordeaux.

=== Bordeaux ===
On 6 August 2019, Koscielny signed for French Ligue 1 club Bordeaux, in a deal rumored to be worth £4,600,000, after nine years with Arsenal.

In January 2022, Koscielny was removed from Bordeaux's first team after he was told his €3 million salary was too high. On 31 January 2022, Bordeaux officially moved him into a non-playing role for Koscielny to "contribute to the development of the club's international partnerships". On 26 March 2022, Koscielny announced his retirement from football.

== International career ==
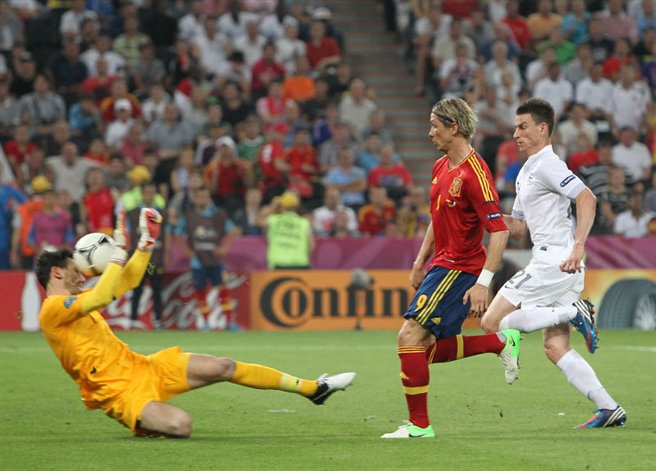
Koscielny (right) and Hugo Lloris (left) playing for France at Euro 2012 against Fernando Torres and Spain

Koscielny was called up to the France national team on 3 February 2011. Before his call up for France, Koscielny was also eligible to play for Poland and initially considered applying for Polish citizenship. In August 2010, it was reported that he had not submitted an application and cancelled a meeting with Poland national team coach Franciszek Smuda in Warsaw on 7 August. Koscielny later declared that his priority was to play for France.

Koscielny was called up to the French team for the first time on 3 February 2011, for the team's friendly versus Brazil on 9 February. Koscielny, along with future Arsenal teammate Olivier Giroud, made their first appearances for les Bleus in a friendly match against the United States on 11 November, with Koscielny playing the entire match in a 1–0 win and Giroud coming on as a substitute.

He made his first appearance in a major tournament during UEFA Euro 2012, when he played the entire match in a 2–0 defeat to Spain in the quarter-finals but was voted Man of the Match by the French media. On 15 November 2013, he was sent off in a 2014 World Cup qualifying play-off against Ukraine.

On 13 May 2014, Koscielny was named in Didier Deschamps' squad for the 2014 FIFA World Cup. He made his FIFA World Cup debut as a substitute for the injured Mamadou Sakho in a 5–2 defeat of Switzerland in the team's second group match. He was then named in the starting line-up for the next match against Ecuador, helping the team to a clean sheet in a 0–0 draw.

Koscielny was named in the squad for the UEFA Euro 2016 and started in all the matches of France's runners-up campaign. On 4 June 2016, he scored his first international goal in a friendly match against Scotland.

Prior to the 2018 FIFA World Cup, Koscielny announced that he would retire from international football after the competition. However, he was not included in the squad after an Achilles tendon injury ruled him out of contention.

== Managerial career ==
In June 2023, Koscielny became the head coach of the Lorient U17 team. On 11 June 2024, he was appointed as sporting director of the club.

== Personal life ==
His grandfather and his great-grandfather were Polish miners who worked in northern France. He has a brother who is 10 years older than him and played in the amateur leagues and now trains at FC Argentat. His father also played in the fourth division of French football for many clubs before becoming a manager. He is married to his long time girlfriend Claire Beaudouin.

== Career statistics ==
=== Club ===
Appearances and goals by club, season and competition
Club	Season	League			National cup (Note: Includes Coupe de France, FA Cup)		League cup (Note: Includes Coupe de la Ligue, Football League/EFL Cup)		Europe		Other		Total	
Club	Season	Division	Apps	Goals	Apps	Goals	Apps	Goals	Apps	Goals	Apps	Goals	Apps	Goals
Guingamp	2004–05	Ligue 2	11	0	3	0	0	0	—		—		14	0
Guingamp	2005–06	Ligue 2	9	0	1	0	0	0	—		—		10	0
Guingamp	2006–07	Ligue 2	21	0	2	0	0	0	—		—		23	0
Guingamp	Total		41	0	6	0	0	0	—		—		47	0
Tours	2007–08	Championnat National	33	1	6	1	—		—		—		39	2
Tours	2008–09	Ligue 2	34	5	5	1	0	0	—		—		39	6
Tours	Total		67	6	11	2	0	0	—		—		78	8
Lorient	2009–10	Ligue 1	35	3	1	0	4	1	—		—		40	4
Arsenal	2010–11	Premier League	30	2	3	0	6	1	4 (Note: Appearances in UEFA Champions League)	0	—		43	3
Arsenal	2011–12	Premier League	33	2	2	0	1	0	6	1	—		42	3
Arsenal	2012–13	Premier League	25	2	3	0	1	1	5	1	—		34	4
Arsenal	2013–14	Premier League	32	2	4	1	1	0	9	0	—		46	3
Arsenal	2014–15	Premier League	27	3	5	0	0	0	6	0	1 (Note: Appearance in FA Community Shield)	0	39	3
Arsenal	2015–16	Premier League	33	4	3	0	0	0	7	0	1	0	44	4
Arsenal	2016–17	Premier League	33	2	2	0	0	0	8	0	—		42	2
Arsenal	2017–18	Premier League	25	2	0	0	2	0	6 (Note: Appearances in UEFA Europa League)	0	0	0	33	2
Arsenal	2018–19	Premier League	17	3	1	0	1	0	10	0	—		29	3
Arsenal	Total		255	22	23	2	12	2	61	2	2	0	353	27
Bordeaux	2019–20	Ligue 1	25	0	1	0	2	0	—		—		28	0
Bordeaux	2020–21	Ligue 1	26	0	0	0	—		—		—		26	0
Bordeaux	2021–22	Ligue 1	11	0	0	0	—		—		—		11	0
Bordeaux	Total		62	0	1	0	2	0	—		—		65	0
Career total			460	31	42	3	18	3	61	2	2	0	583	39

=== International ===
Appearances and goals by national team and year
National team	Year	Apps	Goals
France	2011	1	0
France	2012	6	0
France	2013	8	0
France	2014	6	0
France	2015	5	0
France	2016	16	1
France	2017	8	0
France	2018	1	0
Total		51	1

Scores and results list France's goal tally first, score column indicates score after each Koscielny goal.

List of international goals scored by Laurent Koscielny
No.	Date	Venue	Cap	Opponent	Score	Result	Competition
1	4 June 2016	Stade Saint-Symphorien, Metz, France	29	Scotland	3–0	3–0	Friendly

== Honours ==
Arsenal

- FA Cup: 2013–14, 2014–15
- FA Community Shield: 2014, 2015
- Football League/EFL Cup runner-up: 2010–11, 2017–18
- UEFA Europa League runner-up: 2018–19

Individual

- Ligue 2 Team of the Year: 2008–09
- UEFA Europa League Squad of the Season: 2018–19
