= 2011–12 Arsenal F.C. season =

English football club season

Arsenal
2011–12 season
- 125th Arsenal anniversary crest
- Chairman: Peter Hill-Wood
- Manager: Arsène Wenger
- Stadium: Emirates Stadium
- Premier League: 3rd
- FA Cup: Fifth round
- League Cup: Quarter-finals
- UEFA Champions League: Round of 16
- Top goalscorer: League: Robin van Persie (30); All: Robin van Persie (37)
- Highest home attendance: 60,111 (vs. Chelsea, 21 April 2012, Premier League)
- Lowest home attendance: 46,539 (vs. Shrewsbury Town, 20 September 2011, League Cup)
- Average home league attendance: 60,000
Home colours	Away colours	Third colours

The 2011–12 season was Arsenal's 20th season in the Premier League, their 86th consecutive season in the top flight of English football. and also marked the club's 125th anniversary. In the Premier League, Arsenal struggled to recover from a poor start to the season. Though they did finish the season in the final qualification berth for the next season's UEFA Champions League. Arsenal's UEFA Champions League campaign once again proved unsuccessful, falling at the first hurdle in the knockout stage, with a 4–0 defeat at Milan ultimately proving fatal. Exiting the FA Cup at the fifth round stage at the hands of Sunderland, and the League Cup in the quarter-finals against Manchester City, the two domestic cups were also out of Arsenal's reach.

Arsenal finished the season in third place after winning their last league match 3–2 against West Bromwich Albion on 13 May 2012. It was the first season since the invincibles in 2003–04 which Arsenal finished the top London club in the league, or in which Arsenal finished ahead of Chelsea.

== Review ==
=== Pre-season ===
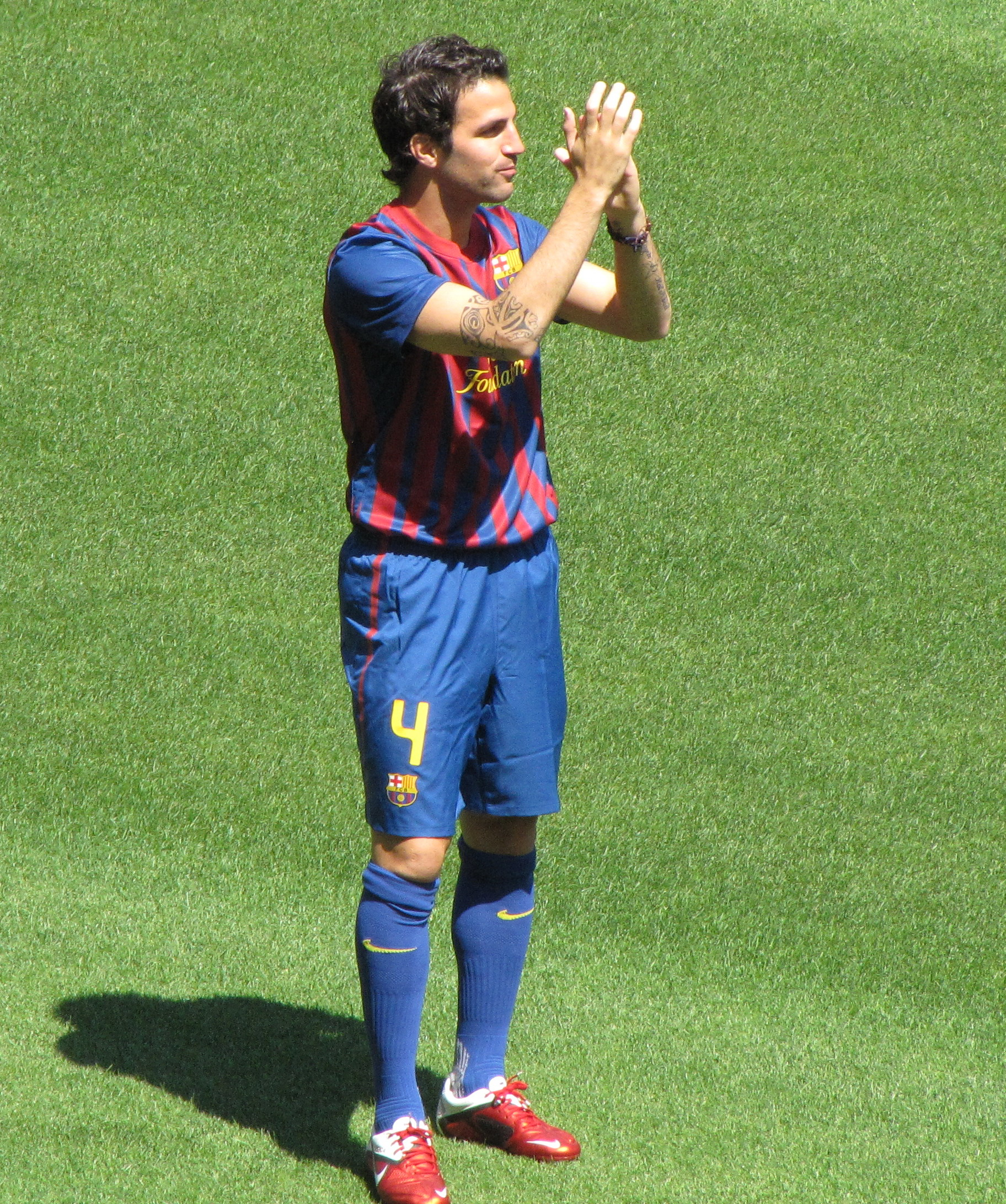
Captain Cesc Fàbregas rejoined Barcelona after eight years at Arsenal.

Arsenal's pre-season transfer activity was once again dominated by media speculation regarding the future of club captain Cesc Fàbregas, whose return to boyhood club Barcelona was widely expected, although not officially confirmed until the middle of August when an initial fee in the region of £30 million was agreed between the two clubs. Prior to this, the Gunners' first signing came in the form of young English-Finnish right-back Carl Jenkinson from Charlton Athletic on 8 June for an initial fee of around £1 million, while the first major signing did not come until 11 July with the signing of Gervinho from French champions Lille for more than £10 million. The only notable exits in July came in goalkeeper Jens Lehmann, who retired for the second time, having come out of his first retirement in March to solve an injury crisis that left Arsenal with just one match-fit goalkeeper, while Gaël Clichy joined Manchester City. It was August before the club's transfer activity increased, with promising young striker Alex Oxlade-Chamberlain joining from Southampton for a reported £12 million, before the departures of Fàbregas to Barcelona, the long-serving Emmanuel Eboué to Turkish side Galatasaray, and Samir Nasri to Manchester City for a fee of £25 million. Left-back Armand Traoré's departure to newly promoted Queens Park Rangers on the penultimate day of the transfer window completed the departures from the first team, before Arsène Wenger, under increasing criticism for the lack of arrivals so far, went on something of a spending spree in the final 48 hours of the window. South Korea captain Park Chu-young joined from Monaco, before left-back André Santos, centre back Per Mertesacker and midfielder Mikel Arteta all joined in the dying hours of the window, from Fenerbahçe, Werder Bremen and Everton respectively. Yossi Benayoun also joined the club on a season long loan from Chelsea, whilst striker Nicklas Bendtner was loaned to Sunderland for the same period, following fellow first-team members Denílson and Carlos Vela, who had joined São Paulo and Real Sociedad on loan earlier in the window. At the close of the window, Arsenal had spent an estimated £51.2 million, compared to an income of nearly £75 million.

Away from the transfer window, Robin van Persie was chosen to replace the departing Fàbregas as club captain, having stood in on several previous occasions when Fàbregas was not playing. Pre-season saw Arsenal hold their first ever Asian tour, commencing against a Malaysian League XI in Kuala Lumpur where goals from Aaron Ramsey, Theo Walcott, Carlos Vela and Tomáš Rosický earned the Gunners a 4–0 win. Chinese side Hangzhou Greentown proved a tougher test in Arsenal's next match, where after falling behind in the 16th minute, Vela scored to achieve a 1–1 draw. Arsenal travelled next to Germany to face 1. FC Köln where new signing Gervinho scored twice in eight minutes on his debut to put the side two goals ahead, before fellow newcomer Carl Jenkinson put the ball through Arsenal's own net, to result in a 2–1 victory for the Gunners. Arsenal's only home pre-season matches came in the annual Emirates Cup tournament, where Boca Juniors, the New York Red Bulls and Paris Saint-Germain were welcomed to London. Arsenal's matches both ended in draws, first surrendering a Van Persie and Aaron Ramsey created two-goal lead against Boca Juniors, before conceding an 84th-minute own goal from Kyle Bartley against the New York Red Bulls the next day, cancelling out a Van Persie opener. Arsenal's run of pre-season fixtures concluded with a loss to Portuguese team Benfica in the Eusébio Cup, once again surrendering a one-goal advantage courtesy of Van Persie to end up losing 2–1 in Lisbon.

=== August ===
Arsenal's fixtures in the Premier League started at Newcastle United, where, despite surrendering a four-goal lead last season, they played out a 0–0 draw this time around. In the match, Gervinho receiving a straight red-card on his competitive debut, whilst Alex Song received a retrospective charge of violent conduct for stamping on Joey Barton. The Gunners faced a two-legged tie against Italian side Udinese to secure qualification to the season's UEFA Champions League competition, with Theo Walcott's fourth-minute goal separating the teams in the first leg at the Emirates, before goals from Walcott and Robin van Persie, as well as a penalty save from Wojciech Szczęsny, saw the Gunners secure victory in the away leg in Udine, and secure their place in the group stage of the competition.

The two legs were sandwiched between an early Premier League title contender clash at the Emirates against Liverpool, where an own goal from Aaron Ramsey and a last minute strike from new Liverpool signing Luis Suárez saw the team fall to a 0–2 defeat, and fuel the widely held belief that Arsenal would once again fail to prove serious challengers for the league title. Any attempt to dispel such a notion was dealt a huge blow the following week, when Arsenal travelled to Old Trafford to suffer their heaviest ever defeat in the Premier League. A hat-trick from Wayne Rooney, two goals from Ashley Young and goals from Danny Welbeck, Nani and Park Ji-sung saw the club slump to an 8–2 hammering at the hands of Manchester United, with Walcott and Van Persie's goals proving no consolation as Arsenal ended the month hovering just one place above the relegation zone, having failed to win any of their opening three league matches.

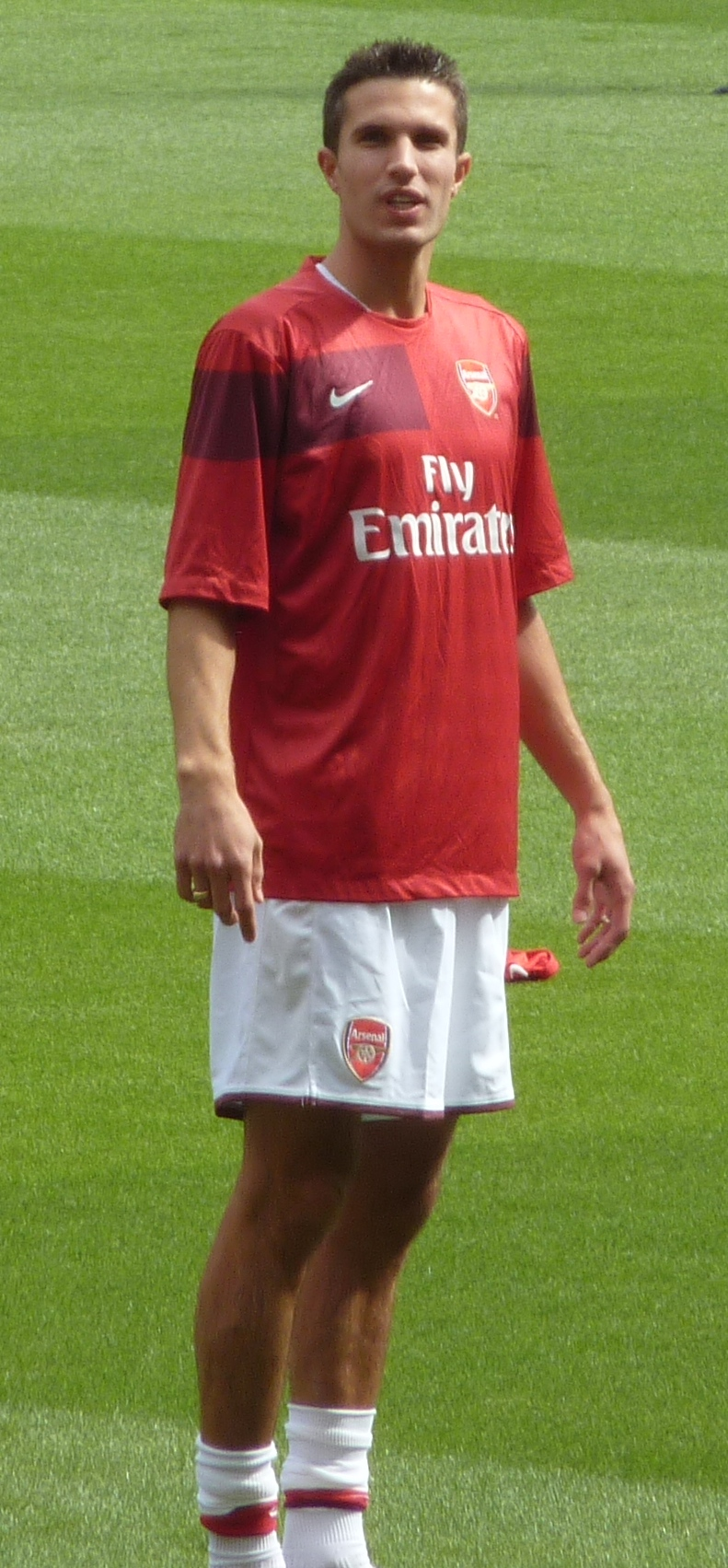
Seven goals in three games saw Robin van Persie named October's Premier League Player of the month.

=== September ===
Arsenal eventually secured their first league win of the season at home to newly promoted Swansea City at the start of September, when Andrey Arshavin's goal proved enough to separate the sides, before the team faced the first of their six Champions League group stage fixtures away to German champions Borussia Dortmund. A win looked to be on the cards thanks to Robin van Persie's first half goal, but Dortmund's Ivan Perišić equalised with just two minutes left to play leaving Arsenal to be satisfied with just a single point. Any hope of progress in the Premier League was dashed when the Gunners gave away a 2–1 half-time lead away to Blackburn Rovers, with own goals from both Alex Song and Laurent Koscielny gifting Blackburn a 4–3 victory.

Arsenal's opening match in the League Cup looked to be a straightforward home tie against League Two outfit Shrewsbury Town, but it was the opposition that opened the scoring, before Kieran Gibbs, Alex Oxlade-Chamberlain and Yossi Benayoun eventually secured progress to the fourth round. This seemed to spark some life into the team, and they ran out 3–0 winners the following week against Bolton Wanderers in the league thanks to a brace from Robin van Persie and a late goal from Alex Song, before securing their first group stage win in Europe at home to Greek champions Olympiacos with goals from Oxlade-Chamberlain and André Santos.

=== October ===
Any suggestion that the end of September had been the start of an Arsenal turnaround was proved wrong in the North London derby at the start of October. Rafael van der Vaart's opening goal at White Hart Lane was cancelled out by Aaron Ramsey, before Kyle Walker secured the bragging rights for Tottenham Hotspur. Following an international break, the Gunners' home match against Sunderland looked set to be heading for a 1–1 draw until Van Persie scored in the last ten minutes to secure all three points, whilst a late goal also earned an away European victory against Marseille, with Ramsey providing the required firepower.

Arsenal's season continued to improve with a 3–1 league victory against Stoke City thanks to two goals from Van Persie and a strike from Gervinho, before Arshavin and Park Chu-young saw the team past Bolton Wanderers in the fourth round of the League Cup. The turnaround was complete when Arsenal beat title-rivals Chelsea 5–3 at Stamford Bridge thanks to goals from André Santos and Theo Walcott, as well as a hat-trick from Van Persie, a performance that helped the Dutchman to the Premier League player of the month award, and saw the Gunners finish October, seventh in the table.

=== November ===
November opened with Marseille visiting the Emirates for the return leg of the Champions League fixture, a game that ended in a 0–0 draw. In the Premier League, Arsenal's good form continued with a 3–0 victory over West Bromwich Albion thanks to goals from Van Persie, Mikel Arteta and Thomas Vermaelen, whose return from injury provided further good news for the team. After another international break, Arsenal continued where they left off with a 2–1 win at Norwich City thanks to two more goals from Robin van Persie, making him just the third player since the Premier League's inception after Alan Shearer and former Arsenal captain Thierry Henry to score 30 goals in a calendar year.

With their Premier League campaign seemingly re-energised, Arsenal's attention turned once more to the Champions League, with Borussia Dortmund being the latest visitors to the Emirates. Arsenal knew a win would be sufficient to secure progression to the knockout phase, but it was Dortmund who made the brighter start until injuries forced two of their key players – Sven Bender and Mario Götze, to be substituted before half time. This allowed Arsenal to capitalise, with man of the moment Van Persie netting two goals in the second half thanks to assists first from Alex Song and then Thomas Vermaelen, before Shinji Kagawa netted the Germans a consolation goal in injury time. The 2–1 victory was not only enough to secure the Gunners' progression, but also top spot in Group F thanks to Olympiacos' victory over second-placed Marseille in the night's other match.

This Champions League success came at a price, however, with the team appearing off form in their next Premier League game against Fulham, who took the lead in the match thanks to a Thomas Vermaelen own goal. It was only when the Belgian defender was able to convert into the right net in the 82nd minute that the Gunners were able to draw level, and end the match with a 1–1 draw. The impact of the result was only alleviated by results elsewhere, with four of the six teams above Arsenal in the table – Liverpool, Manchester City, Manchester United and Newcastle United all playing out draws in the same weekend.

November ended on somewhat of a negative note, with the team exiting the League Cup with a fifth round loss to Manchester City, although the Gunners were by no means overwhelmed by the Premier League leaders. Instead, the young and relatively inexperienced side that included the likes of Emmanuel Frimpong, Alex Oxlade-Chamberlain and Park Chu-young, as well as reserve team players Ignasi Miquel and Francis Coquelin, held their own for much of the match, with just a single goal by Sergio Agüero in the 83rd minute being able to separate the two sides.

=== December ===
A 4–0 win in the Premier League away at Wigan Athletic allowed Arsenal to continue their progression up the league table thanks to goals from Mikel Arteta, Thomas Vermaelen, Gervinho and Robin van Persie, before the team travelled to Athens to face Olympiacos in their final group stage match in the Champions League. With a group topping position already secured, Arsène Wenger chose to field a much weakened side, making ten changes from the team that started at Wigan three days earlier, and this was evident as the team fell to a 3–1 defeat. Łukasz Fabiański was injured in the 25th minute and replaced by Vito Mannone.

The return of Arsenal's stronger starting 11 in their next Premier League match saw the team return to winning ways, securing a 1–0 victory at home to Everton, before making the trip to the Etihad Stadium a week later to face league leaders Manchester City without both first choice full-backs, Bacary Sagna and André Santos. Despite these absences, the Gunners put up a strong fight, and it was only David Silva's effort early in the second half that was enough to separate the teams at the final whistle. Arsenal entered the Christmas fixtures with a 2–1 victory over Aston Villa, with Van Persie scoring his 34th Premier League goal of 2011, equaling Thierry Henry's club record, before Yossi Benayoun secured his first league goal for Arsenal, along with all three points.

Arsenal ended December with two games in four days, and Gervinho's eighth-minute goal looked to have set the Gunners off well against Wolverhampton Wanderers, but Steven Fletcher's equaliser later in the first half ended up restricting them to just a single point. The year ended with a 1–0 win over Queens Park Rangers at the Emirates, with Van Persie's goal being enough to secure him the club record for goals scored in a calendar year, although he did fall a single strike short of equalling Alan Shearer's Premier League record of 36.

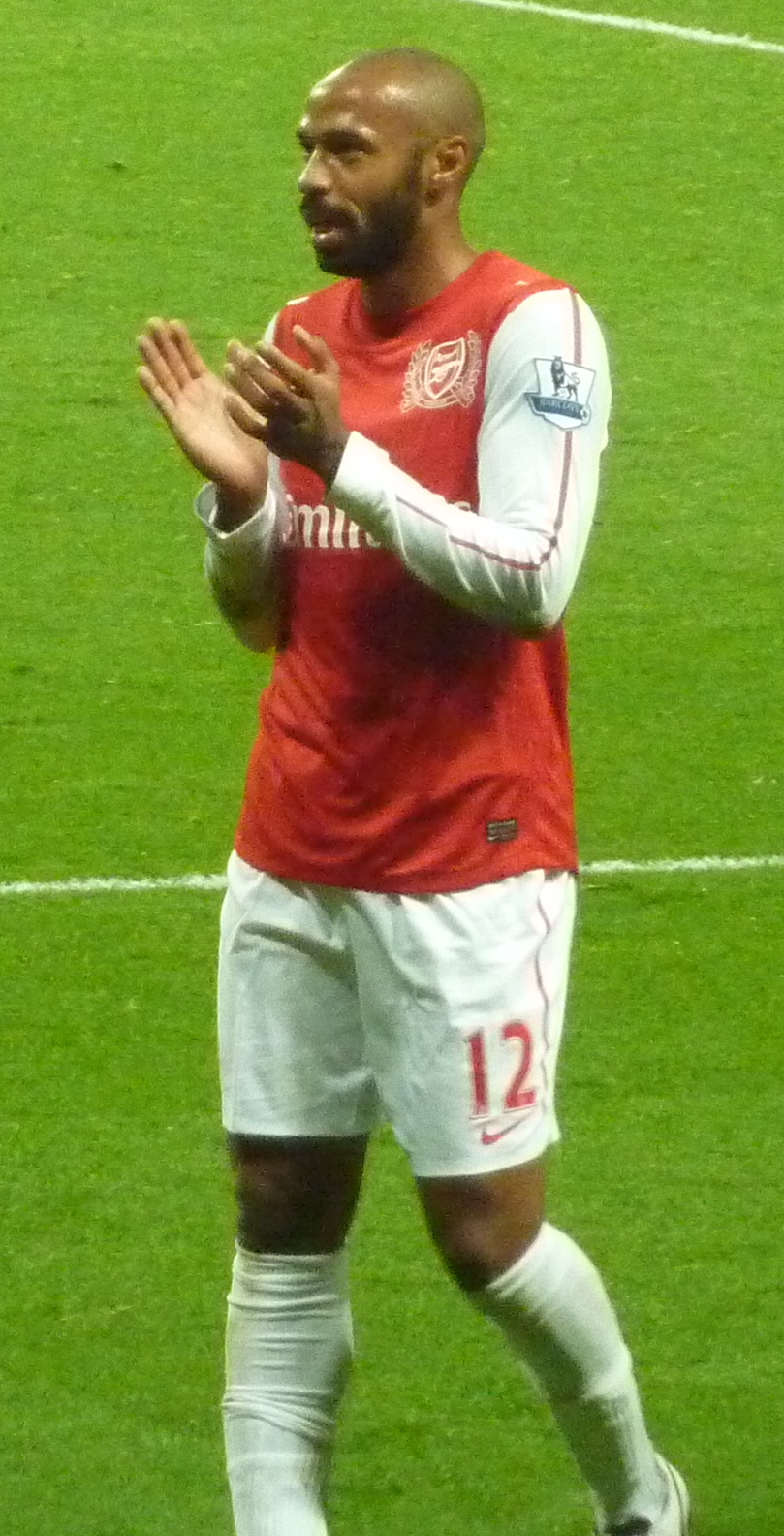
Arsenal legend Thierry Henry rejoined on loan in the January transfer window.

=== January ===
Arsenal's new year seemed set to get off to a good start, with Laurent Koscielny's goal grabbing a lead against Fulham in their opening match, but in what has become something of an Arsenal trait, the team could not strengthen their position, and Fulham seized on this. Late goals from Steve Sidwell and Bobby Zamora undid Arsenal and saw the team fall to a 2–1 defeat. The defeat was, however, somewhat overshadowed by the club's announcement a few days later that the Gunners' record goal-scorer and former Captain Thierry Henry was returning to the Emirates for a short-term loan during the close-season of the North America's Major League Soccer (MLS), in which Henry now plays full-time.

Henry's second debut for the club came as a substitute in the team's first foray in this season's FA Cup, against Leeds United in the Third Round. Given Henry's record of 226 goals in his 370 appearances during his first stint at Arsenal, it came as little surprise when he netted the game's only goal just ten minutes after coming onto the pitch, securing the team's progress to the Fourth Round.

However, if things were going well in the Cup, the same could not be said for progress in the Premier League. Arsenal first surrendered an early lead against Swansea, before giving away another goal just seconds after grabbing an equaliser in the second half to go down 3–2 in South Wales. The following week, the Gunners hosted Manchester United for the first time since last year's 8–2 humiliation at Old Trafford. Despite United leading at half-time, Van Persie scored his 19th league goal of the season to draw the teams level, before Danny Welbeck took advantage of further defensive lapses to inflict the Arsenal's third defeat in a row, and further hamper the team's quest for qualification to next season's Champions League.

With the Premier League title now out of reach, Arsenal hosted Aston Villa in the Fourth Round of the FA Cup knowing that it was their last realistic chance of silverware. This chance did little to spur the team on, and goals from Richard Dunne and Darren Bent in the first half saw the Gunners' facing exit from the competition at half time. However, a spirited Arsenal performance in the opening spell of the second half, including three goals in seven minutes from Van Persie (2) and Theo Walcott, saw the team claim a 3–2 victory and secure a place in the Fifth Round.

=== February ===
Arsenal opened February with an emphatic 7–1 victory over struggling Blackburn to halt their poor run of league form. Van Persie brought his goal tally in all competitions to 28 with a hat-trick, whilst Alex Oxlade-Chamberlain continued his impressive run of form by scoring his first and second Premier League goals. Mikel Arteta also found the net, before Henry scored his first Premier League goal in nearly six years to complete the victory in stoppage time. Henry's talents were required again in Arsenal's next league match, away to Sunderland, who were on a superb run of form under new manager Martin O'Neill. Henry secured all three points for the Gunners in injury time, following Aaron Ramsey's earlier goal that cancelled out James McClean's goal for Sunderland.

Despite an apparent resurgence in the Premier League, Arsenal's cup ambitions took consecutive knocks in mid-February. They first lost the opening leg of their Champions League round of 16 match against Milan 4–0, before being knocked out of the FA Cup by Sunderland just three days later, leaving the team facing yet another season without any silverware.

These cup exits left Arsenal to focus solely on achieving fourth position in the league, and thus ensuring further Champions League football at the Emirates. This aim would be tested heavily in their next game, the North London derby against age-old rivals Tottenham, who have spent the season so far above Arsenal in the table. It seemed that Arsenal's poor form against their rivals in recent years was likely to continue, falling 2–0 behind through goals from Louis Saha and former Gunner Emmanuel Adebayor, before Bacary Sagna and the ever-reliable Van Persie scored in quick succession to bring the teams level at half-time. Arsenal continued to press in the second-half, and were rewarded with a goal from Tomáš Rosický and a brace from Theo Walcott to secure a memorable 5–2 victory that the Gunners would savour, and that saw the team strengthen their challenge for fourth place.

=== March ===
The North London derby victory spurred Arsenal on to continue their good Premier League form at the start of March. A Robin van Persie brace was enough to come from behind to beat Liverpool at Anfield, before securing a 3–0 home victory against Milan thanks to goals from Laurent Koscielny, Tomáš Rosický and Van Persie. Although not enough to overturn the first leg deficit, the win did allow the Gunners to bow out of European football for the season in excellent style.

Arsenal's reduced fixture-load soon became evident in results in the Premier League. They first secured an injury time victory against fellow competitors for the European places in the table, Newcastle. Vermaelen scored the winner in the fifth minute of added time at the end of the match, after Van Persie had drawn the teams level early in the first half. It was Vermaelen who again secured all three points in Arsenal's next match, away to Everton, a victory that was also enough to propel Arsenal above Tottenham into third place in the league table.

A 3–0 victory against Aston Villa, with goals from Kieran Gibbs, Theo Walcott and Mikel Arteta, took Arsenal's run of form to seven consecutive Premier League victories, a feat the team had not managed since October 2007, as well as strengthening their position in third place. The team, however, fell one game short of going the whole of March unbeaten, falling to a 2–1 defeat away to QPR, where Walcott's strike proved insufficient to secure any points for the Gunners.

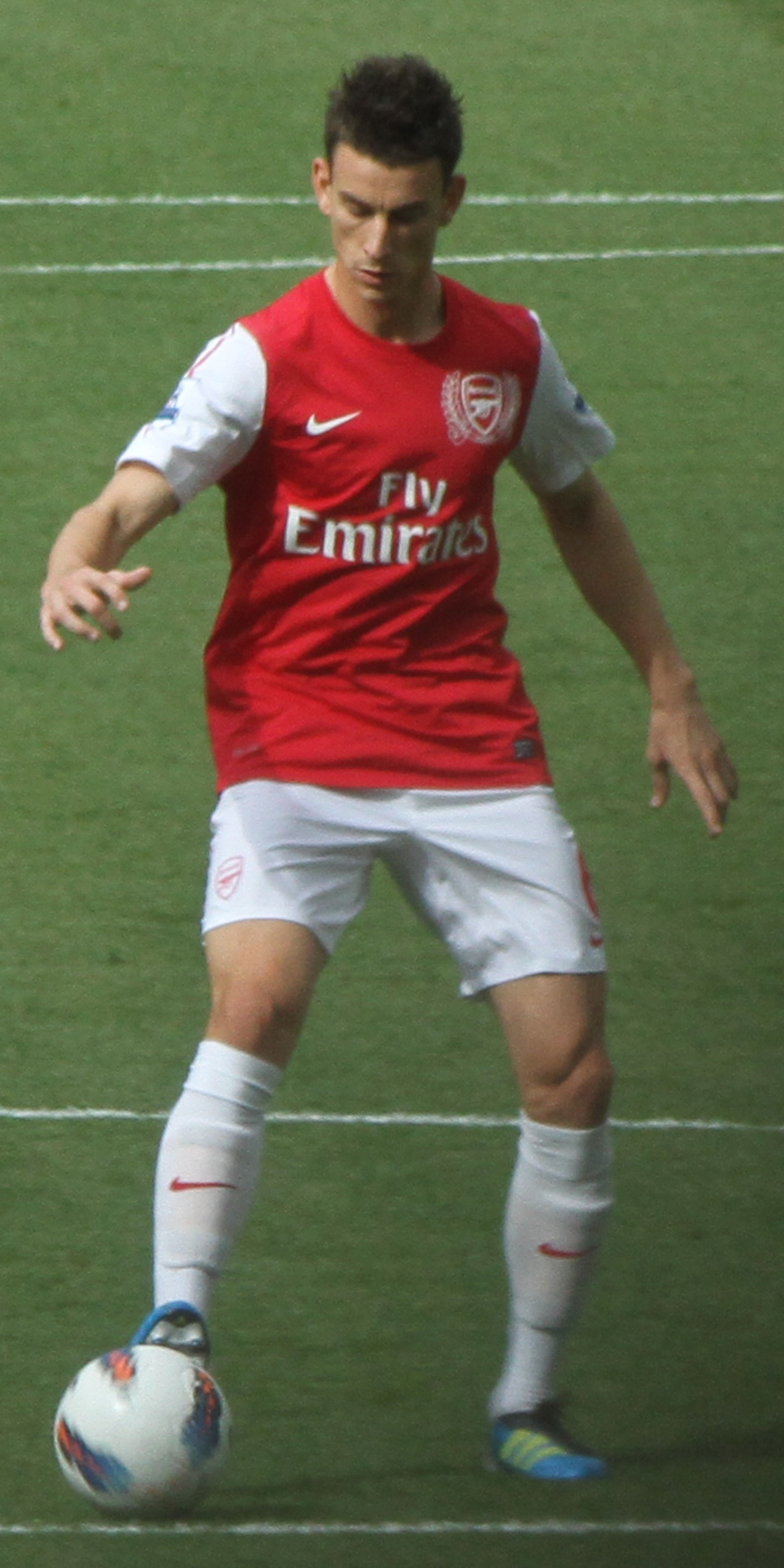
Laurent Koscielny scored the crucial goal in Arsenal's final match of the season that secured the team's qualification to next season's Champions League group stage.

=== April ===
April started well for Arsenal, with back to back victories helping them to maintain their position in the Premier League's Champions League qualifications places. A Mikel Arteta goal in the 87th minute was enough to first secure a 1–0 home victory over championship contenders Manchester City, before Van Persie, Walcott and Benayoun all scored to record a 3–0 victory at struggling Wolves.

Arsenal stuttered as April progressed however, falling first to a 2–1 home defeat by Wigan, where Thomas Vermaelen's goal was not enough to overcome two early Wigan goals, before the team played out a goalless draw with fellow European contenders Chelsea. Another draw completed Arsenal's April, sharing the points with Stoke after a 1–1 stalemate, with Van Persie adding another goal to his already impressive tally, pushing him closer to the Premier League's golden boot award, but also cancelling out Peter Crouch's earlier goal for the home side at the Britannia Stadium.

=== May ===
Arsenal's attempts to secure Champions League qualification continued into their final two matches of the season in May. Yossi Benayoun's opening goal just two minutes into their final home match of the season, against Norwich, seemed to have got them off to a good start, before two goals in twenty minutes gave the visitors an unexpected lead. A Van Persie brace in eight minutes put the Gunners back ahead, and seemingly on the verge of all but securing third place in the table. A Norwich equaliser in the 85th minute, however, shattered that dream, meaning their ongoing battle with Tottenham for guaranteed Champions League football would have to be settled on the final day of the season.

That final day saw Arsenal travel to face West Brom whilst Tottenham hosted Fulham, with an Arsenal win being enough to guarantee third. Tottenham took the lead in the second minute to take them above Arsenal in the table, but a second goal in as many games from Benayoun saw the Gunners retake the position just two minutes later. However, a brace from West Brom within four minutes saw Arsenal fall behind, and apparently gifting Spurs the last definite English berth in the Champions League, before André Santos was able to draw Arsenal back level before half-time. Arsenal were still outside the Premier League top three, and it fell to Laurent Koscielny to score in the 54th minute to secure victory and the final English group stage place in the next season's Champions League competition. As the season concluded, captain Robin van Persie was confirmed as the winner of the Premier League's Golden Boot award with 30 goals in the season.

=== Key events ===
- 9 June 2011: Finnish-English right back Carl Jenkinson moves to Arsenal from Charlton Athletic for an agreed fee of £1 million.
- 17 July: Thomas Cruise, Roarie Deacon and Mark Randall reach the end of their contracts with Arsenal to become free agents.
- 4 July 2011: French left back Gaël Clichy joins Manchester City for a fee of £7 million.
- 11 July 2011: Ivorian winger Gervinho joins Arsenal from Lille for a fee around £10.5 million.
- 26 July 2011: English striker Jay Emmanuel-Thomas signed for Championship club Ipswich Town for a fee of £1.1 million.
- 8 August 2011: English winger Alex Oxlade-Chamberlain signs from Southampton for an undisclosed fee, thought to be around £12 million.
- 9 August 2011: Japanese winger Ryo Miyaichi is granted a work permit which allows him to play for Arsenal.
- 15 August 2011: Spanish central midfielder Cesc Fàbregas joins Barcelona for a fee of £35 million, with a possible further £5 million of add-ons.
- 16 August 2011: Ivorian right back Emmanuel Eboué joins Galatasaray on a five-year deal for a fee of £4 million.
- 19 August 2011: Costa Rican striker Joel Campbell from Saprissa agreed terms with Arsenal; the fee is undisclosed, though thought to be around £1 million.
- 24 August 2011: French attacking midfielder Samir Nasri joins Manchester City on a four-year deal for around a deal of £25 million.
- 30 August 2011: Senegalese left back Armand Traoré joins Queens Park Rangers for £1.5 million, while South Korean striker Park Chu-young joins Arsenal from Monaco for £1.8 million.
- 31 August 2011: On the final day of the transfer window, Brazilian left back André Santos, German centre back Per Mertesacker, Israeli attacking midfielder Yossi Benayoun and Spanish central midfielder Mikel Arteta all join the club, while French striker Gilles Sunu leaves to join Lorient.
- 18 October 2011: Belgian centre back Thomas Vermaelen signs a new long-term contract.
- 10 December 2011: The club unveil bronze statues of Herbert Chapman, Tony Adams and Thierry Henry outside of Emirates Stadium as part of 125th Anniversary celebrations.
- 1 January 2012: Ghanaian midfielder Emmanuel Frimpong is loaned to Wolverhampton Wanderers for the remainder of the season.
- 6 January 2012: French forward Thierry Henry rejoins the club from New York Red Bulls on a two-month loan deal.
- 31 January 2012: German attacking midfielder Thomas Eisfeld joins the club on a long-term contract, while winger Ryo Miyaichi left on loan to Bolton Wanderers until the end of the season.
- 12 March 2012: Czech attacking midfielder Tomáš Rosický signs a new contract.

== Players ==
=== Squad information ===
N	Pos.	Nat.	Name	Age	EU	Since	App	Goals	Ends	Transfer fee	Notes
1	GK	(Spain)	Manuel Almunia	34	EU	2004	175	0	2012	£500,000	
2	MF	(France)	Abou Diaby	26	EU	2006 (Winter)	163	19	undisclosed	£2 million	
3	DF	(France)	Bacary Sagna	29	EU	2007	205	4	2014	£7.5 million	
4	DF	(Germany)	Per Mertesacker	27	EU	2011	27	0	2015	£8 million	
5	DF	(Belgium)	Thomas Vermaelen (vice-captain)	26	EU	2009	90	14	2015	£10 million	
6	DF	(France)	Laurent Koscielny	26	EU	2010	85	6	undisclosed	£8.5 million	
7	MF	(Czech Republic)	Tomáš Rosický	31	EU	2006	166	19	2014	£6.8 million	
8	MF	(Spain)	Mikel Arteta	30	EU	2011	38	6	2015	£10 million	
9	FW	(South Korea)	Park Chu-young	26	Non-EU	2011	6	1	undisclosed	£1.8 million	
10	FW	(Netherlands)	Robin van Persie (captain)	28	EU	2004	278	132	2013	£2.75 million	
11	DF	(Brazil)	André Santos	29	Non-EU	2011	21	3	undisclosed	£6.2 million	
13	GK	(Poland)	Wojciech Szczęsny	22	EU	2006	72	0	undisclosed	Youth system	
14	FW	(England)	Theo Walcott	23	EU	2006 (Winter)	220	42	2013	£9 million	
15	FW	(England)	Alex Oxlade-Chamberlain	18	EU	2011	26	4	undisclosed	£12 million	
16	MF	(Wales)	Aaron Ramsey	21	EU	2008	103	9	undisclosed	£4.8 million	
17	MF	(Cameroon)	Alex Song	24	EU	2005	204	10	2014	£1 million	
18	DF	(France)	Sébastien Squillaci	31	EU	2010	38	2	2013	£3.3 million	
19	MF	(England)	Jack Wilshere	20	EU	2008	64	3	undisclosed	Youth system	
20	DF	(Switzerland)	Johan Djourou	25	EU	2003	142	1	2015	Youth system	
21	GK	(Poland)	Łukasz Fabiański	27	EU	2007	62	0	undisclosed	£2 million	
23	MF	(Russia)	Andrey Arshavin	30	Non-EU	2009 (Winter)	133	30	2013	£15 million	On loan to Zenit St. Petersburg
24	GK	(Italy)	Vito Mannone	24	EU	2005	10	0	2014	£350,000	On loan to Hull City
25	DF	(England)	Carl Jenkinson	20	EU	2011	14	0	undisclosed	£1 million	
26	MF	(Ghana)	Emmanuel Frimpong	20	EU	2008	14	0	undisclosed	Youth system	
27	FW	(Ivory Coast)	Gervinho	24	Non-EU	2011	37	4	undisclosed	£10.5 million	
28	DF	(England)	Kieran Gibbs	22	EU	2007	72	2	undisclosed	Youth system	
29	FW	(Morocco)	Marouane Chamakh	28	EU	2010	63	12	undisclosed	Free	
30	MF	(Israel)	Yossi Benayoun	32	Non-EU	2011	25	6	2012	Loan	On loan from Chelsea
31	FW	(Japan)	Ryo Miyaichi	19	Non-EU	2011 (Winter)	2	0	undisclosed	Free	On loan to Bolton Wanderers
39	MF	(France)	Francis Coquelin	21	EU	2008	21	0	undisclosed	Youth system	
46	MF	(England)	Henri Lansbury	21	EU	2007	8	1	undisclosed	Youth system	On loan to West Ham United
52	FW	(Denmark)	Nicklas Bendtner	24	EU	2004	157	45	undisclosed	Youth system	On loan to Sunderland
	MF	(Brazil)	Denílson	24	Non-EU	2006	153	10	undisclosed	£3.5 million	On loan to São Paulo
	FW	(Mexico)	Carlos Vela	23	EU	2005	62	11	2013	£500,000	On loan to Real Sociedad
	FW	(Costa Rica)	Joel Campbell	19	Non-EU	2011	0	0	undisclosed	£900,000	On loan to FC Lorient

- Last updated: 13 May 2012
- Source: Arsenal F.C. and footballdatabase.com (for EU passport, country as international player, contract ending and transfer fee)
- Ordered by squad number.

=== Reserve squad ===
As of 10 January 2012.

Note: Flags indicate national team as defined under FIFA eligibility rules; some limited exceptions apply. Players may hold more than one non-FIFA nationality.

No.	Pos.	Nation	Player
33	FW	COD	Benik Afobe
34	MF	ENG	Chuks Aneke
35	FW	GHA	Zak Ansah
37	DF	GHA	Daniel Boateng
38	DF	ENG	George Brislen-Hall
40	MF	ENG	Craig Eastmond
43	DF	SUI	Sead Hajrović
44	MF	IRL	Conor Henderson
45	DF	TTO	Gavin Hoyte
47	GK	IRL	Sean McDermott
48	MF	MSR	Jernade Meade
49	DF	ESP	Ignasi Miquel

No.	Pos.	Nation	Player
50	FW	IRL	Rhys Murphy
51	FW	JAM	Nigel Neita
53	MF	TUR	Oğuzhan Özyakup
55	MF	ENG	Sanchez Watt
56	DF	CHN	Nico Yennaris
57	DF	SUI	Martin Angha
58	MF	NED	Kyle Ebecilio
59	GK	ARG	Emiliano Martínez
60	DF	SUI	Elton Monteiro
61	MF	ENG	Josh Rees
62	GK	ENG	James Shea
64	GK	ENG	Ray Ainston
65	FW	COD	Dijae Moketonga

=== In ===
#	Position	Player	Transferred from	Fee	Date	Team	Source
25	DF	(England) Carl Jenkinson	(England) Charlton Athletic	£1 million	8 June 2011	First-team	
	MF	(Spain) Jon Toral	(Spain) Barcelona	£350,000	1 July 2011	Academy	
	DF	(Spain) Héctor Bellerín	(Spain) Barcelona	£400,000	1 July 2011	Academy	
27	FW	(Ivory Coast) Gervinho	(France) Lille	£10.5 million	11 July 2011	First-team	
15	FW	(England) Alex Oxlade-Chamberlain	(England) Southampton	£12 million	8 August 2011	First-team	
	FW	(Costa Rica) Joel Campbell	(Costa Rica) Deportivo Saprissa	£900,000	19 August 2011	First-team	
9	FW	(South Korea) Park Chu-young	(France) Monaco	£1.8 million	30 August 2011	First-team	
11	DF	(Brazil) André Santos	(Turkey) Fenerbahçe	£6.2 million	31 August 2011	First-team	
4	DF	(Germany) Per Mertesacker	(Germany) Werder Bremen	£8 million	31 August 2011	First-team	
8	MF	(Spain) Mikel Arteta	(England) Everton	£10 million	31 August 2011	First-team	
	MF	(Germany) Thomas Eisfeld	(Germany) Borussia Dortmund	£420,000	31 January 2012	Reserves	
	MF	(England) Tarum Dawkins	(England) Luton Town	Undisclosed	2 March 2012	Academy	

Total spending: ▼£51.57 million

=== Out ===
#	Position	Player	Transferred to	Fee	Date	Source
13	GK	(Germany) Jens Lehmann	Retired	N/A	1 July 2011	
38	DF	(England) Thomas Cruise	(England) Torquay United	Free transfer	1 July 2011	
54	MF	(England) Mark Randall	(England) Chesterfield	Free transfer	1 July 2011	
39	FW	(England) Roarie Deacon	(England) Sunderland	Free transfer	1 July 2011	
22	DF	(France) Gaël Clichy	(England) Manchester City	£7 million	4 July 2011	
41	MF	(England) Jay Emmanuel-Thomas	(England) Ipswich Town	£1.1 million	26 July 2011	
	MF	(England) Jamie Edge	(England) West Bromwich Albion	Free transfer	2 August 2011	
4	MF	(Spain) Cesc Fàbregas	(Spain) Barcelona	£35 million	15 August 2011	
27	DF	(Ivory Coast) Emmanuel Eboué	(Turkey) Galatasaray	£3 million	16 August 2011	
8	MF	(France) Samir Nasri	(England) Manchester City	£25 million	24 August 2011	
30	DF	(Senegal) Armand Traoré	(England) Queens Park Rangers	£1.5 million	30 August 2011	
54	FW	(France) Gilles Sunu	(France) Lorient	£1.3 million	31 August 2011	
41	FW	(England) Luke Freeman	(England) Stevenage	Undisclosed	10 January 2011	

Total income: ▲£73.9 million

=== Loan in ===
Squad #	Position	Player	Loaned from	Date	Loan expires	Team	Source
30	MF	(Israel) Yossi Benayoun	(England) Chelsea	31 August 2011	End of the season	First-team	
12	FW	(France) Thierry Henry	(United States) New York Red Bulls	6 January 2012	16 February 2012	First-team	

=== Loan out ===
Squad #	Position	Player	Loaned to	Date	Loan expires	Source
	FW	(Brazil) Wellington	(Spain) Levante	10 July 2011	End of the season	
15	MF	(Brazil) Denílson	(Brazil) São Paulo	19 July 2011	End of the season	
	GK	(England) James Shea	(England) Dagenham and Redbridge	26 July 2011	5 December 2011	
	MF	(Bolivia) Samuel Galindo	(Spain) Gimnàstic de Tarragona	4 August 2011	End of the season	
	DF	(England) Kyle Bartley	(Scotland) Rangers	5 August 2011	End of the season	
11	FW	(Mexico) Carlos Vela	(Spain) Real Sociedad	16 August 2011	End of the season	
	DF	(Brazil) Pedro Botelho	(Spain) Rayo Vallecano	16 August 2011	End of the season	
46	MF	(England) Henri Lansbury	(England) West Ham United	31 August 2011	End of the season	
	FW	(Costa Rica) Joel Campbell	(France) Lorient	31 August 2011	End of the season	
52	FW	(Denmark) Nicklas Bendtner	(England) Sunderland	31 August 2011	End of the season	
1	GK	(Spain) Manuel Almunia	(England) West Ham United	30 September 2011	31 October 2011	
41	FW	(England) Luke Freeman	(England) Stevenage	18 November 2011	8 January 2012	
34	MF	(England) Chuks Aneke	(England) Stevenage	22 November 2011	6 March 2012	
55	FW	(England) Sanchez Watt	(England) Sheffield Wednesday	23 November 2011	16 January 2012	
26	MF	(Ghana) Emmanuel Frimpong	(England) Wolverhampton Wanderers	1 January 2012	End of the season	
24	GK	(Italy) Vito Mannone	(England) Hull City	4 January 2012	End of the season	
43	DF	(Switzerland) Sead Hajrović	(England) Barnet	18 January 2012	18 February 2012	
	FW	(Brazil) Wellington	(Spain) Alcoyano	20 January 2012	End of the season	
37	DF	(Ghana) Daniel Boateng	(England) Swindon Town	20 January 2012	End of the season	
55	MF	(England) Sanchez Watt	(England) Crawley Town	26 January 2012	End of the season	
45	DF	(England) Gavin Hoyte	(England) AFC Wimbledon	27 January 2012	27 February 2012	
50	FW	(Republic of Ireland) Rhys Murphy	(England) Preston North End	30 January 2012	End of the season	
31	FW	(Japan) Ryo Miyaichi	(England) Bolton Wanderers	31 January 2012	End of the season	
40	MF	(England) Craig Eastmond	(England) Wycombe Wanderers	21 February 2012	End of the season	
23	MF	(Russia) Andrey Arshavin	(Russia) Zenit St. Petersburg	25 February 2012	End of the season	
47	GK	(Republic of Ireland) Sean McDermott	(England) Leeds United	12 March 2012	12 April 2012	
33	FW	(England) Benik Afobe	(England) Reading	22 March 2012	End of the season	
34	MF	(England) Chuks Aneke	(England) Preston North End	22 March 2012	End of the season	
56	DF	(England) Nico Yennaris	(England) Notts County	23 March 2012	End of the season	

=== Overall transfer activity ===
Spending

▼£51.57 million

Income

▲£73.9 million

Net expenditure

▲£22.33 million

== Club ==
=== Coaching staff ===
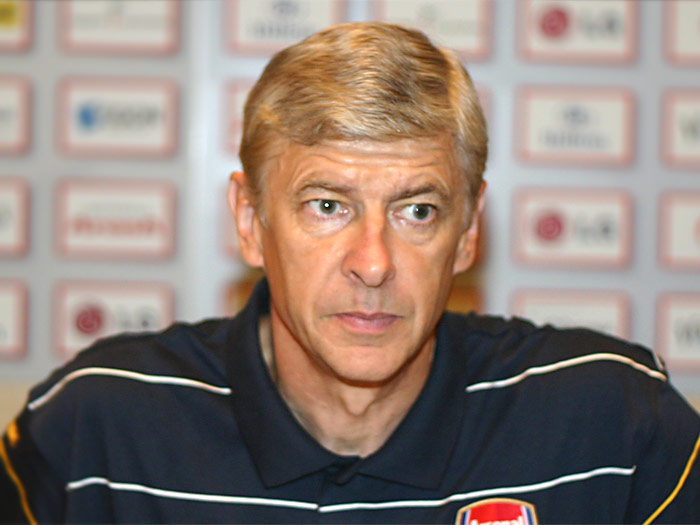
This is Arsène Wenger's 16th season with Arsenal

Position	Staff
Manager	(France) Arsène Wenger
Assistant manager	(Northern Ireland) Pat Rice
First team coach	(Bosnia and Herzegovina) Boro Primorac
Goalkeeping coach	(Republic of Ireland) Gerry Peyton
Fitness coach	(England) Tony Colbert
Physiotherapist	(England) Colin Lewin
Club doctor	(Republic of Ireland) Gary O'Driscoll
Kit manager	(England) Vic Akers (England) Paul Johnson
Chief scout	(England) Steve Rowley

Last updated: 11 May 2010
Source: Arsenal F.C.

=== Kit ===
Supplier: Nike / Sponsor: Fly Emirates

Home	Home alt.	Away	Away alt.	Away alt. 2	Third	Goalkeeper 1	Goalkeeper 2	Goalkeeper 3

=== Kit information ===
Arsenal's home, away, third and goalkeeper outfits featured an anniversary crest to mark the club's 125th anniversary. The crest featured 15 laurel leaves on the left side of the crest to reflect the detail on the reverse of the sixpence pieces paid by 15 men to establish the Club in Woolwich in 1886. The 15 oak leaves to the right of the crest paid tribute to the founders who would meet in the local Royal Oak pub. Underneath the crest was one of the club's first recorded mottos – "Forward" – with the anniversary dates of 1886 and 2011 either side.

- Home: The home kit was based on Nike Classic 2011 template in the club's traditional red and white colours, with red trim on the arms.
- Away: The away kit was based on Nike Harlequin 2011 template. The front of the away kit was divided into two-halves in navy blue and one turquoise, inspired by some of the away kits in the 1990s which featured the same colour scheme. The diagonal design represented the gnomon (the pointer) which casts the shadow on a sundial – to commemorate the original Dial Square sundial on the site of the Arsenal munitions factory in Woolwich, where the club was founded in 1886. The back of the shirt was entirely navy blue, with one sleeve navy and the other turquoise. A stripe runs down each sleeves, broken into three parts to further represent the Dial Square sundial. The away shorts were navy blue, as were the socks
- Third: The yellow/maroon away kit from last season was retained as a third kit with 125th anniversary celebratory maroon badge, with yellow shorts used only once against Milan.
- Keeper: The goalkeeper kits featured a stunning graphic running down from the bottom of the arms to the side of the shirt, which was part of Nike's 2011 goalkeeper template also worn by other clubs as well. The first-choice kit was mainly navy with orange detailing. The alternative kits were dark green with yellow detailing and grey with turquoise detailing, respectively.

==== Other information ====
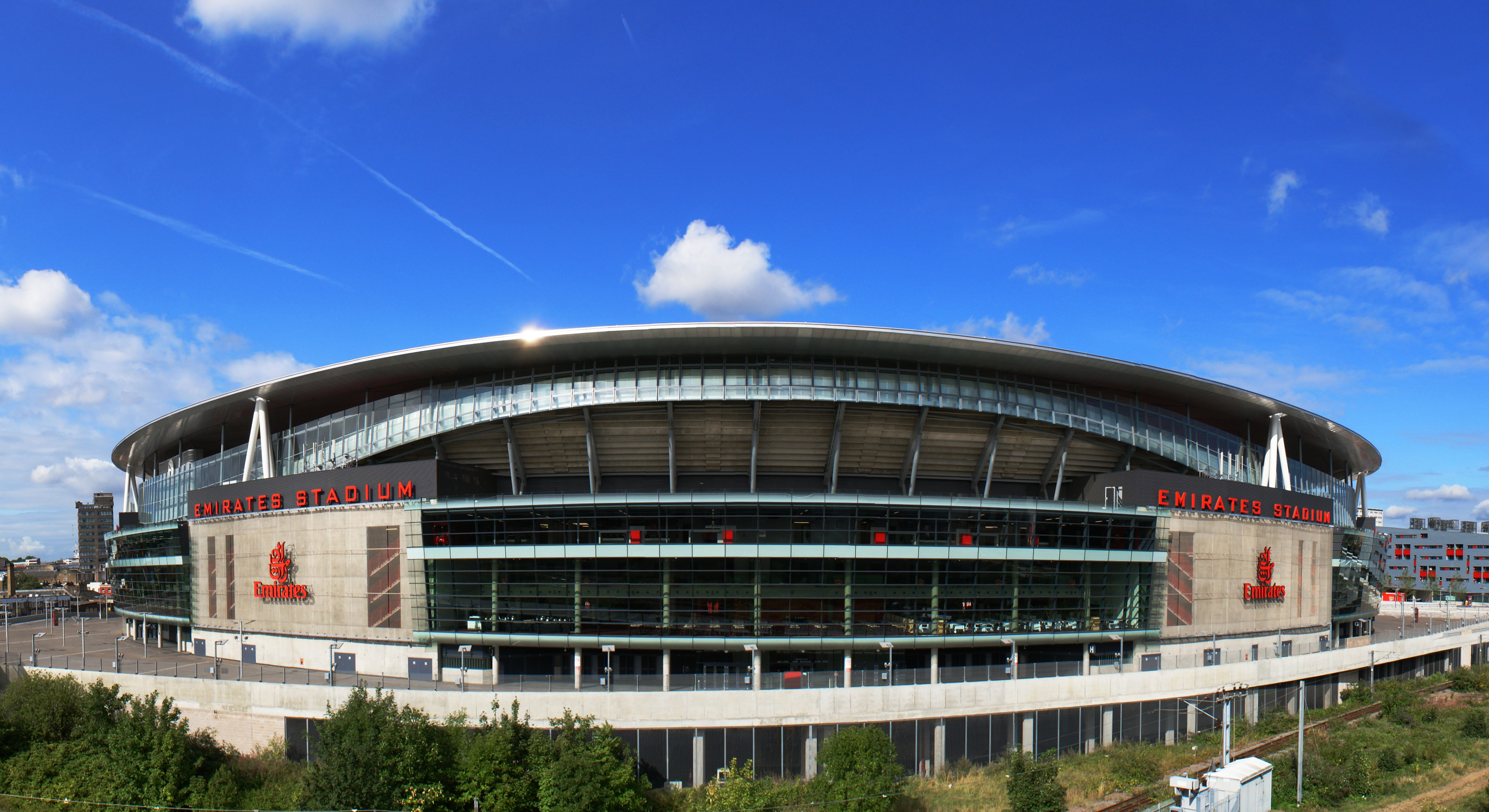
The Emirates Stadium is the second largest stadium in the Premier League.

Chairman	(England) Peter Hill-Wood
Ground (capacity and dimensions)	Emirates Stadium (60,355 / 113x76 metres)

Updated to match played 11 May 2010
Source: Arsenal F.C.

== Competitions ==
=== Overall ===
Competition	Started round	Final position / round	First match	Last match
Premier League	—	3rd	13 August	13 May
UEFA Champions League	Play-off round	Round of 16	16 August	6 March
Football League Cup	3rd round	Quarter-finals	20 September	29 November
FA Cup	3rd round	5th round	9 January	18 February

Updated to match played 13 May 2012
Source: Competitions

=== Pre-season ===
==== Friendlies ====
13 July 2011	Malaysia XI	0–4	(England) Arsenal	Kuala Lumpur, Malaysia
18:45 MST (13:45 BST)		Report	Ramsey 5' (pen.); Walcott 36'; Vela 59'; Rosický 90'	Stadium: Bukit Jalil Stadium; Attendance: 70,000; Referee: Mohd Yusof bin Mat Karim

16 July 2011	Hangzhou Greentown (China)	1–1	(England) Arsenal	Yiwu, China
19:30 CST (12:30 BST)	Vázquez 16'	Report	Vela 45'	Stadium: Meihu Sports Centre; Attendance: 20,583

23 July 2011	1. FC Köln (Germany)	1–2	(England) Arsenal	Cologne, Germany
15:30 CEST (14:30 BST)	Jenkinson 45' (o.g.)	Report	Gervinho 7', 15'	Stadium: RheinEnergieStadion; Attendance: 41,500; Referee: Christian Fischer

==== Emirates Cup ====
Pos	Team	Pld	W	D	L	GF	GA	GD	Pts
1	(United States) New York Red Bulls	2	1	1	0	2	1	+1	4
2	(France) Paris Saint-Germain	2	1	0	1	3	1	+2	3
3	(England) Arsenal	2	0	2	0	3	3	0	2
4	(Argentina) Boca Juniors	2	0	1	1	2	5	−3	1

Rules for classification: Three points were awarded for a win, and one point for a draw. Unlike previous Emirates Cups, no points were awarded for goals scored.

30 July 2011 Day 1	Arsenal (England)	2–2	(Argentina) Boca Juniors	London
16:20 BST	Van Persie 29'; Ramsey 46'	Report	Viatri 68'; Mouche 72'	Stadium: Emirates Stadium; Referee: Martin Atkinson

31 July 2011 Day 2	Arsenal (England)	1–1	(United States) New York Red Bulls	London
16:20 BST	Van Persie 42'	Report	Bartley 84' (o.g.)	Stadium: Emirates Stadium; Referee: Kevin Friend

==== Eusébio Cup ====
6 August 2011 Eusébio Cup	Benfica (Portugal)	2–1	(England) Arsenal	Lisbon, Portugal
19:45 BST	Aimar 49'; Nolito 60'	Report	Van Persie 34'	Stadium: Estádio da Luz; Attendance: 40,833; Referee: Duarte Gomes

Last updated: 22 June 2018
Source: Arsenal F.C.

=== Premier League ===
==== League table ====
Pos	Team	Pld	W	D	L	GF	GA	GD	Pts	Qualification or relegation
1	Manchester City (C)	38	28	5	5	93	29	+64	89	Qualification for the Champions League group stage
2	Manchester United	38	28	5	5	89	33	+56	89	Qualification for the Champions League group stage
3	Arsenal	38	21	7	10	74	49	+25	70	Qualification for the Champions League group stage
4	Tottenham Hotspur	38	20	9	9	66	41	+25	69	Qualification for the Europa League group stage (Note: Chelsea won the Champions League and thus qualified for the group stage as defending champions, forfeiting their spot in the Europa League as the FA Cup winners. This meant that Tottenham were to compete in the Europa League group stage, since, pursuant to the rules, only four clubs from the Premier League could play in the Champions League.)
5	Newcastle United	38	19	8	11	56	51	+5	65	Qualification for the Europa League play-off round

Source: Barclays Premier League
Rules for classification: 1) points; 2) goal difference; 3) number of goals scored.
(C) Champions

==== Results summary ====
Overall								Home						Away					
Pld	W	D	L	GF	GA	GD	Pts	W	D	L	GF	GA	GD	W	D	L	GF	GA	GD
38	21	7	10	74	49	+25	70	12	4	3	39	17	+22	9	3	7	35	32	+3

Last updated: 13 May 2012.
Source: Premier League

==== Results by round ====
Round	1	2	3	4	5	6	7	8	9	10	11	12	13	14	15	16	17	18	19	20	21	22	23	24	25	26	27	28	29	30	31	32	33	34	35	36	37	38
Ground	A	H	A	H	A	H	A	H	H	A	H	A	H	A	H	A	A	H	H	A	A	H	A	H	A	H	A	H	A	H	A	H	A	H	H	A	H	A
Result	D	L	L	W	L	W	L	W	W	W	W	W	D	W	W	L	W	D	W	L	L	L	D	W	W	W	W	W	W	W	L	W	W	L	D	D	D	W
Position	9	14	17	12	17	13	15	10	11	12	7	7	6	5	5	5	5	5	4	5	5	5	7	6	4	4	4	4	3	3	3	3	3	3	3	3	3	3

Updated to match(es) played on completed. Source: Competitive Matches
A = Away; H = Home; W = Win; D = Draw; L = Loss

==== Matches ====
13 August 2011 1	Newcastle United	0–0	Arsenal	Newcastle upon Tyne
17:30 BST	Coloccini (yellow card) 45+1'; Tioté (yellow card) 67'; Barton (yellow card) 76'	Report	(yellow card) 29' Song; (yellow card) 48' Gibbs; (yellow card) 52' Rosický; (red card) 76' Gervinho; (yellow card) 78' Szczęsny; (yellow card) 90+1' Vermaelen	Stadium: St James' Park; Attendance: 46,894; Referee: Peter Walton

20 August 2011 2	Arsenal	0–2	Liverpool	London
12:45 BST	Frimpong (yellow card) 8' (yellow-red card) 70'; Lansbury (yellow card) 89'	Report	(yellow card) 28' Carroll; (yellow card) 45' Lucas; 78' (o.g.) Ramsey; 90' Suárez	Stadium: Emirates Stadium; Attendance: 60,090; Referee: Martin Atkinson

28 August 2011 3	Manchester United	8–2	Arsenal	Manchester
16:00 BST	Welbeck 22'; Young (yellow card) 26', (goal) 28', 90+1'; Evans (yellow card) 26'; Rooney 41', 64', 82' (pen.); Nani 69'; Park 70'	Report	(yellow card) 14' Arshavin; (penalty missed) 27' 74' Van Persie; (yellow card) 39' (yellow-red card) 76' Jenkinson; 45+3' Walcott; (yellow card) 62' Djourou	Stadium: Old Trafford; Attendance: 75,448; Referee: Howard Webb

10 September 2011 4	Arsenal	1–0	Swansea City	London
15:00 BST	Arshavin 40'; Walcott (yellow card) 48'; Koscielny (yellow card) 52'; Arteta (yellow card) 77'	Report	(yellow card) 24' Agustien; (yellow card) 68' Caulker	Stadium: Emirates Stadium; Attendance: 60,087; Referee: Stuart Attwell

17 September 2011 5	Blackburn Rovers	4–3	Arsenal	Blackburn
12:45 BST	Yakubu 25', 59'; Song 50' (o.g.); Dann (yellow card) 67'; Koscielny 69' (o.g.); Olsson (yellow card) 74'	Report	10' Gervinho; 34' Arteta; (yellow card) 57' Djourou; 85' Chamakh	Stadium: Ewood Park; Attendance: 22,637; Referee: Andre Marriner

24 September 2011 6	Arsenal	3–0	Bolton Wanderers	London
15:00 BST	Van Persie 46', 71'; Song 89'	Report	(red card) 55' Wheater; (yellow card) 58' Steinsson	Stadium: Emirates Stadium; Attendance: 59,727; Referee: Mark Clattenburg

2 October 2011 7	Tottenham Hotspur	2–1	Arsenal	London
16:00 BST	Van der Vaart (yellow card) 27', (goal) 40'; Walker 73'; Parker (yellow card) 74'	Report	(yellow card) 32' Mertesacker; 51' Ramsey	Stadium: White Hart Lane; Attendance: 36,274; Referee: Mike Dean

16 October 2011 8	Arsenal	2–1	Sunderland	London
13:30 BST	Van Persie 1', 83', (yellow card) 83'; Song (yellow card) 57'; Koscielny (yellow card) 63'	Report	31' Larsson; (yellow card) 52' Vaughan; (yellow card) 55' Larsson; (yellow card) 61' Brown	Stadium: Emirates Stadium; Attendance: 60,078; Referee: Howard Webb

23 October 2011 9	Arsenal	3–1	Stoke City	London
13:30 BST	Gervinho 27'; Van Persie 73', 82'	Report	(yellow card) 31' Whitehead; 34' Crouch; (yellow card) 55' Wilkinson	Stadium: Emirates Stadium; Attendance: 59,671; Referee: Lee Mason

29 October 2011 10	Chelsea	3–5	Arsenal	London
12:45 BST	Lampard 14'; Terry 45'; Ivanović (yellow card) 79'; Mata 80'; Meireles (yellow card) 90+2'	Report	36', 85', 90+2', (yellow card) 78' Van Persie; 49' Santos; (yellow card) 50' Szczęsny; 55' Walcott; (yellow card) 90+1' Song	Stadium: Stamford Bridge; Attendance: 41,801; Referee: Andre Marriner

5 November 2011 11	Arsenal	3–0	West Bromwich Albion	London
15:00 GMT	Van Persie 22'; Vermaelen 39'; Arteta 74'	Report		Stadium: Emirates Stadium; Attendance: 60,091; Referee: Michael Oliver

19 November 2011 12	Norwich City	1–2	Arsenal	Norwich
12:45 GMT	Morison 16'; Bennett (yellow card) 66'; Tierney (yellow card) 81'; Holt (yellow card) 86'	Report	26', 59' Van Persie	Stadium: Carrow Road; Attendance: 26,801; Referee: Phil Dowd

26 November 2011 13	Arsenal	1–1	Fulham	London
17:30 GMT	Santos (yellow card) 28'; Vermaelen 82'	Report	(yellow card) 28' Zamora; (yellow card) 45+1' Etuhu; 65' (o.g.) Vermaelen; (yellow card) 77' Senderos	Stadium: Emirates Stadium; Attendance: 60,043; Referee: Mike Dean

3 December 2011 14	Wigan Athletic	0–4	Arsenal	Wigan
15:00 GMT	Caldwell (yellow card) 52'; Gohouri (yellow card) 73'; Diamé (yellow card) 88'	Report	28' Arteta; 29' Vermaelen; (yellow card) 57' Song; 61' Gervinho; 78' Van Persie; (yellow card) 85' Coquelin	Stadium: DW Stadium; Attendance: 19,280; Referee: Mark Clattenburg

10 December 2011 15	Arsenal	1–0	Everton	London
15:00 GMT	Arteta (yellow card) 16'; Ramsey (yellow card) 38'; Van Persie 70'	Report	(yellow card) 24' Coleman; (yellow card) 82' Distin	Stadium: Emirates Stadium; Attendance: 60,062; Referee: Howard Webb

18 December 2011 16	Manchester City	1–0	Arsenal	Manchester
16:10 GMT	Barry (yellow card) 39'; Silva 53'; Agüero (yellow card) 72'	Report	(yellow card) 11' Song; (yellow card) 45' Koscielny; (yellow card) 74' Arteta	Stadium: Etihad Stadium; Attendance: 47,303; Referee: Phil Dowd

21 December 2011 17	Aston Villa	1–2	Arsenal	Birmingham
19:45 GMT	Clark (yellow card) 38'; Albrighton 54'; Hutton (yellow card) 90+3' (yellow-red card) 90+4'	Report	17' (pen.) (yellow card) 78' Van Persie; (yellow card) 27' Coquelin; (yellow card) 45' Mertesacker; 87' Benayoun	Stadium: Villa Park; Attendance: 35,818; Referee: Jonathan Moss

27 December 2011 18	Arsenal	1–1	Wolverhampton Wanderers	London
15:00 GMT	Gervinho 8'; Vermaelen (yellow card) 57'; Song (yellow card) 69'	Report	(yellow card) 32' Johnson; 38' Fletcher; (yellow card) 73' Guedioura; (red card) 75' Milijaš; (yellow card) 90+2' Hennessey	Stadium: Emirates Stadium; Attendance: 59,686; Referee: Stuart Attwell
Note: This match, originally scheduled for 26 December 2011, was postponed 24 hours due to industrial action.

31 December 2011 19	Arsenal	1–0	Queens Park Rangers	London
15:00 GMT	Vermaelen (yellow card) 37'; Djourou (yellow card) 40'; Van Persie 60'	Report	(yellow card) 27' Barton; (yellow card) 54' Young	Stadium: Emirates Stadium; Attendance: 60,067; Referee: Martin Atkinson

2 January 2012 20	Fulham	2–1	Arsenal	London
17:30 GMT	Sidwell 85'; Zamora 90+3'	Report	21' Koscielny; (yellow card) 63' (yellow-red card) 78' Djourou	Stadium: Craven Cottage; Attendance: 25,700; Referee: Lee Probert

15 January 2012 21	Swansea City	3–2	Arsenal	Swansea
16:00 GMT	Sinclair 16' (pen.); Dyer 57'; Graham 70'	Report	5' Van Persie; 69' Walcott	Stadium: Liberty Stadium; Attendance: 20,409; Referee: Michael Oliver

22 January 2012 22	Arsenal	1–2	Manchester United	London
16:00 GMT	Ramsey (yellow card) 43'; Van Persie 71', (yellow card) 85'; Koscielny (yellow card) 73'; Rosický (yellow card) 86'; Song (yellow card) 90+6'	Report	(yellow card) 44' Rafael; 45+1' Valencia; 81' Welbeck; (yellow card) 90' Evra	Stadium: Emirates Stadium; Attendance: 60,093; Referee: Mike Dean

1 February 2012 23	Bolton Wanderers	0–0	Arsenal	Bolton
20:00 GMT	Steinsson (yellow card) 39'	Report	(yellow card) 37' Vermaelen	Stadium: Reebok Stadium; Attendance: 24,371; Referee: Chris Foy

4 February 2012 24	Arsenal	7–1	Blackburn Rovers	London
13:00 GMT	Van Persie 2', 38', 62'; Koscielny (yellow card) 31'; Oxlade-Chamberlain 40', 54'; Arteta 51'; Vermaelen (yellow card) 85'; Dann 90+3' (o.g.)^{(Note)}	Report	(yellow card) 15' Modeste; (yellow card) 25' Nzonzi; 31' Pedersen; (yellow card) 40' Olsson; (red card) 43' Givet	Stadium: Emirates Stadium; Attendance: 59,643; Referee: Andre Marriner
Note: The goal was originally awarded to Thierry Henry, but the Dubious Goals Committee eventually awarded it as an own goal to Scott Dann

11 February 2012 25	Sunderland	1–2	Arsenal	Sunderland
15:00 GMT	Richardson (yellow card) 18'; Campbell (yellow card) 44'; McClean 70'	Report	75' Ramsey; (yellow card) 77' Rosický; 90+1' Henry	Stadium: Stadium of Light; Attendance: 40,312; Referee: Neil Swarbrick

26 February 2012 26	Arsenal	5–2	Tottenham Hotspur	London
13:30 GMT	Koscielny (yellow card) 31'; Sagna 40'; Arteta (yellow card) 42'; Van Persie 43', (yellow card) 79'; Rosický 51'; Walcott 65', 68'	Report	4' Saha; (yellow card) 29' Modrić; (yellow card) 30' (yellow-red card) 87' Parker; 34' (pen.) Adebayor; (yellow card) 61' Sandro	Stadium: Emirates Stadium; Attendance: 60,106; Referee: Mike Dean

3 March 2012 27	Liverpool	1–2	Arsenal	Liverpool
12:45 GMT	Koscielny 23' (o.g.)	Report	31', 90+2' Van Persie; (yellow card) 64' Vermaelen	Stadium: Anfield; Attendance: 44,922; Referee: Mark Halsey

12 March 2012 28	Arsenal	2–1	Newcastle United	London
20:00 GMT	Van Persie 15', (yellow card) 90+7'; Koscielny (yellow card) 77'; Vermaelen 90+5'	Report	14' Ben Arfa; (yellow card) 64' Tioté; (yellow card) 86' Gutiérrez; (yellow card) 90+7' Krul	Stadium: Emirates Stadium; Attendance: 60,095; Referee: Howard Webb

21 March 2012 29	Everton	0–1	Arsenal	Liverpool
20:00 GMT	Cahill (yellow card) 52'; Pienaar (yellow card) 61'	Report	8' Vermaelen; (yellow card) 39' Sagna	Stadium: Goodison Park; Attendance: 30,330; Referee: Lee Mason

24 March 2012 30	Arsenal	3–0	Aston Villa	London
15:00 GMT	Gibbs 16'; Walcott 25'; Arteta 90+3'	Report	(yellow card) 15' Petrov; (yellow card) 52' Warnock; (yellow card) 70' Ireland; (yellow card) 89' Collins; (yellow card) 90+2' Lichaj	Stadium: Emirates Stadium; Attendance: 60,108; Referee: Phil Dowd

31 March 2012 31	Queens Park Rangers	2–1	Arsenal	London
15:00 BST	Taarabt 22', (yellow card) 23'; Mackie (yellow card) 62'; Diakité 66', (yellow card) 90+4'; Ferdinand (yellow card) 90'; Barton (yellow card) 90+4'	Report	37' Walcott; (yellow card) 62' Vermaelen; (yellow card) 65' Song	Stadium: Loftus Road; Attendance: 18,033; Referee: Mike Dean

8 April 2012 32	Arsenal	1–0	Manchester City	London
16:00 BST	Santos (yellow card) 60'; Koscielny (yellow card) 68'; Arteta 87'	Report	(yellow card) 2' Y. Touré; (yellow card) 38' (yellow-red card) 90' Balotelli; (yellow card) 56' Milner; (yellow card) 90+5' Zabaleta	Stadium: Emirates Stadium; Attendance: 60,096; Referee: Martin Atkinson

11 April 2012 33	Wolverhampton Wanderers	0–3	Arsenal	Wolverhampton
19:45 BST	Bassong (red card) 8'; Doyle (yellow card) 40'; Zubar (yellow card) 57'; Kightly (yellow card) 58'	Report	Van Persie 9' (pen.); Walcott 11'; Benayoun 69'	Stadium: Molineux; Attendance: 25,815; Referee: Neil Swarbrick

16 April 2012 34	Arsenal	1–2	Wigan Athletic	London
20:00 BST	Vermaelen 21'; Sagna (yellow card) 33'; Song (yellow card) 72'	Report	7' Di Santo; 8' Gómez; (yellow card) 59' Caldwell; (yellow card) 90+1' Al-Habsi; (yellow card) 90+5' McArthur	Stadium: Emirates Stadium; Attendance: 60,060; Referee: Andre Marriner

21 April 2012 35	Arsenal	0–0	Chelsea	London
12:45 BST	Rosický (yellow card) 30'; Van Persie (yellow card) 50'; Diaby (yellow card) 76'	Report	(yellow card) 49' Malouda; (yellow card) 54' Cahill; (yellow card) 72' Boswinga; (yellow card) 81' Cole	Stadium: Emirates Stadium; Attendance: 60,111; Referee: Mike Dean

28 April 2012 36	Stoke City	1–1	Arsenal	Stoke-on-Trent
15:00 BST	Whitehead (yellow card) 3'; Crouch 9'	Report	15' Van Persie; (yellow card) 63' Benayoun; (yellow card) 67' Song	Stadium: Britannia Stadium; Attendance: 27,502; Referee: Chris Foy

5 May 2012 37	Arsenal	3–3	Norwich City	London
12:45 BST	Benayoun 2'; Ramsey (yellow card) 20'; Vermaelen (yellow card) 45+3'; Van Persie 72', 80'	Report	12', (yellow card) 60' Hoolahan; 27' Holt; (yellow card) 30' Jackson; 85' Morison; (yellow card) 90+2' Wilbraham	Stadium: Emirates Stadium; Attendance: 60,092; Referee: Anthony Taylor

13 May 2012 38	West Bromwich Albion	2–3	Arsenal	West Bromwich
15:00 BST	Long 12'; Dorrans 15'	Report	4' Benayoun; 30' Santos; (yellow card) 39' Van Persie; 54' Koscielny	Stadium: The Hawthorns; Attendance: 26,358; Referee: Mike Jones

Last updated: 13 May 2012
Source: Arsenal F.C.
Note: Premier League fixtures not listed due to copyright

=== UEFA Champions League ===
==== Play-off round ====
16 August 2011 First leg	Arsenal (England)	1–0	(Italy) Udinese	London, England
19:45 BST	Walcott 4', (yellow card) 12'; Gibbs (yellow card) 45'	Report	(yellow card) 2' Benatia; (yellow card) 11' Neuton; (yellow card) 71' Pinzi; (yellow card) 79' Armero	Stadium: Emirates Stadium; Attendance: 58,159; Referee: Kevin Blom (Netherlands)

24 August 2011 Second leg	Udinese (Italy)	1–2 (1–3 agg.)	(England) Arsenal	Udine, Italy
19:45 BST	Di Natale 39'; Isla (yellow card) 52'; Benatia (yellow card) 74'; Fabbrini (yellow card) 87'	Report	55' Van Persie; (yellow card) 58' Vermaelen; 69', (yellow card) 74' Walcott; (yellow card) 70' Sagna; (yellow card) 75' Jenkinson	Stadium: Stadio Friuli; Attendance: 25,687; Referee: Olegário Benquerença (Portugal)

==== Group stage ====
Pos	Team	Pld	W	D	L	GF	GA	GD	Pts	Qualification
1	(England) Arsenal	6	3	2	1	7	6	+1	11	Advance to knockout phase
2	(France) Marseille	6	3	1	2	7	4	+3	10	Advance to knockout phase
3	(Greece) Olympiacos	6	3	0	3	8	6	+2	9	Transfer to Europa League
4	(Germany) Borussia Dortmund	6	1	1	4	6	12	−6	4	

Source: Soccerway

13 September 2011 1	Borussia Dortmund (Germany)	1–1	(England) Arsenal	Dortmund, Germany
19:45 BST	Schmelzer (yellow card) 76'; Perišić 88'; Bender (yellow card) 90+4'	Report	42' Van Persie; (yellow card) 75' Sagna	Stadium: Signal Iduna Park; Attendance: 75,000; Referee: Gianluca Rocchi (Italy)

28 September 2011 2	Arsenal (England)	2–1	(Greece) Olympiacos	London, England
19:45 BST	Oxlade-Chamberlain 8'; Santos 20'; Rosický (yellow card) 34'; Arteta (yellow card) 77'	Report	27', (yellow card) 70' Fuster; (yellow card) 49' Holebas; (yellow card) 85' Djebbour	Stadium: Emirates Stadium; Attendance: 59,676; Referee: Carlos Velasco Carballo (Spain)

19 October 2011 3	Marseille (France)	0–1	(England) Arsenal	Marseille, France
19:45 BST	Ayew (yellow card) 14'; Diawara (yellow card) 49'; Gignac (yellow card) 84'	Report	(yellow card) 4' Song; (yellow card) 16' Santos; (yellow card) 74' Djourou; 90+2' Ramsey	Stadium: Stade Vélodrome; Attendance: 24,534; Referee: Damir Skomina (Slovenia)

1 November 2011 4	Arsenal (England)	0–0	(France) Marseille	London, England
19:45 GMT	Rosický (yellow card) 85'	Report	(yellow card) 40' Diarra	Stadium: Emirates Stadium; Attendance: 59,961; Referee: Paolo Tagliavento (Italy)

23 November 2011 5	Arsenal (England)	2–1	(Germany) Borussia Dortmund	London, England
19:45 GMT	Van Persie 49', 86'; Walcott (yellow card) 63'; Ramsey (yellow card) 76'; Benayoun (yellow card) 78'	Report	(yellow card) 53' Schmelzer; 90+2' Kagawa	Stadium: Emirates Stadium; Attendance: 59,531; Referee: Frank De Bleeckere (Belgium)

6 December 2011 6	Olympiacos (Greece)	3–1	(England) Arsenal	Piraeus, Greece
19:45 GMT	Papadopoulos (yellow card) 4'; Djebbour 16'; Holebas (yellow card) 30'; Fuster 36'; Modesto 89'	Report	57' Benayoun; (yellow card) 61' Frimpong; (yellow card) 81' Oxlade-Chamberlain	Stadium: Karaiskakis Stadium; Attendance: 32,000; Referee: Alberto Mallenco (Spain)

==== Knockout phase ====
===== Round of 16 =====
15 February 2012 First leg	Milan (Italy)	4–0	(England) Arsenal	Milan, Italy
19:45 GMT	Boateng 15'; Robinho 38', 49'; Antonini (yellow card) 45+3'; Mexès (yellow card) 62'; Ibrahimović 79' (pen.); Ambrosini (yellow card) 81'	Report	(yellow card) 72' Song; (yellow card) 78' Djourou	Stadium: San Siro; Attendance: 68,257; Referee: Viktor Kassai (Hungary)

6 March 2012 Second leg	Arsenal (England)	3–0 (3–4 agg.)	(Italy) Milan	London, England
19:45 GMT	Koscielny 7'; Sagna (yellow card) 13'; Gibbs (yellow card) 15'; Rosický 26'; Van Persie 43' (pen.); Song (yellow card) 57'	Report	(yellow card) 5' Van Bommel; (yellow card) 86' Nocerino; (yellow card) 86' Ibrahimović; (yellow card) 90+3' Abate	Stadium: Emirates Stadium; Attendance: 59,973; Referee: Damir Skomina (Slovenia)

Last updated: 6 March 2012
Source: Arsenal F.C.

=== FA Cup ===
9 January 2012 Third round	Arsenal	1–0	Leeds United	London
19:45 GMT	Henry 78'; Arshavin (yellow card) 90+2'	Report	(yellow card) 43' O'Dea; (yellow card) 64' Townsend	Stadium: Emirates Stadium; Attendance: 59,615; Referee: Mark Clattenburg

29 January 2012 Fourth round	Arsenal	3–2	Aston Villa	London
16:00 GMT	Van Persie 54' (pen.), 61' (pen.); Walcott 57'; Koscielny (yellow card) 80'	Report	33', (yellow card) 44' Dunne; 45+1' Bent	Stadium: Emirates Stadium; Attendance: 60,019; Referee: Mike Jones

18 February 2012 Fifth round	Sunderland	2–0	Arsenal	Sunderland
17:15 GMT	Richardson 40'; Larrson (yellow card) 66'; Gardner (yellow card) 75'; Oxlade-Chamberlain 78' (o.g.); Cattermole (yellow card) 79'	Report	(yellow card) 39' Djourou; (yellow card) 47' Sagna; (yellow card) 57' Vermaelen	Stadium: Stadium of Light; Attendance: 26,042; Referee: Howard Webb

Last updated: 18 February 2012
Source: Arsenal F.C.

=== League Cup ===
20 September 2011 Third round	Arsenal	3–1	Shrewsbury Town	London
19:45 BST	Gibbs 33'; Oxlade-Chamberlain 58'; Benayoun 78'	Report	16' Collins; (yellow card) 43' McAllister	Stadium: Emirates Stadium; Attendance: 46,539; Referee: Anthony Bates

25 October 2011 Fourth round	Arsenal	2–1	Bolton Wanderers	London
19:45 BST	Squillaci (yellow card) 27'; Arshavin 53'; Park 56'	Report	47' Muamba	Stadium: Emirates Stadium; Attendance: 56,628; Referee: Anthony Taylor

29 November 2011 Quarter-finals	Arsenal	0–1	Manchester City	London
20:00 GMT		Report	(yellow card) 53' Hargreaves; 83' Agüero	Stadium: Emirates Stadium; Attendance: 60,028; Referee: Lee Probert

Last updated: 29 November 2011
Source: Arsenal F.C.

== Squad statistics ==
=== Appearances and goals ===
As of 13 May 2012

No.	Pos	Nat	Player	Total		Premier League		FA Cup		League Cup		Champions League	
No.	Pos	Nat	Player	Apps	Goals	Apps	Goals	Apps	Goals	Apps	Goals	Apps	Goals
1	GK	(Spain) ESP	Manuel Almunia	0	0	0	0	0	0	0	0	0	0
2	MF	(France) FRA	Abou Diaby	5	0	0+4	0	0	0	0	0	0+1	0
3	DF	(France) FRA	Bacary Sagna	28	1	19+1	1	1+1	0	0	0	6	0
4	DF	(Germany) GER	Per Mertesacker	28	0	22	0	1	0	0	0	5	0
5	DF	(Belgium) BEL	Thomas Vermaelen	40	6	28+1	6	2	0	1+1	0	7	0
6	DF	(France) FRA	Laurent Koscielny	42	3	33	2	2	0	1	0	6	1
7	MF	(Czech Republic) CZE	Tomáš Rosický	38	2	19+9	1	1+1	0	0	0	5+3	1
8	MF	(Spain) ESP	Mikel Arteta	38	6	29	6	2+1	0	0	0	6	0
9	FW	(South Korea) KOR	Park Chu-young	6	1	0+1	0	0	0	3	1	1+1	0
10	FW	(Netherlands) NED	Robin van Persie	48	37	37+1	30	2	2	0	0	6+2	5
11	DF	(Brazil) BRA	André Santos	21	3	10+5	2	0	0	0	0	5+1	1
12	FW	(France) FRA	Thierry Henry	7	2	0+4	1	0+2	1	0	0	0+1	0
13	GK	(Poland) POL	Wojciech Szczęsny	48	0	38	0	1	0	0	0	9	0
14	FW	(England) ENG	Theo Walcott	46	11	32+3	8	1+2	1	0	0	8	2
15	FW	(England) ENG	Alex Oxlade-Chamberlain	26	4	6+10	2	3	0	3	1	3+1	1
16	MF	(Wales) WAL	Aaron Ramsey	44	3	27+7	2	3	0	0	0	5+2	1
17	MF	(Cameroon) CMR	Alex Song	46	1	34+0	1	3	0	0	0	9	0
18	DF	(France) FRA	Sébastien Squillaci	6	0	0+1	0	1+1	0	2	0	1	0
19	MF	(England) ENG	Jack Wilshere	0	0	0	0	0	0	0	0	0	0
20	DF	(Switzerland) SUI	Johan Djourou	27	0	14+4	0	1	0	2	0	2+4	0
21	GK	(Poland) POL	Łukasz Fabiański	6	0	0	0	2	0	3	0	1	0
23	MF	(Russia) RUS	Andrey Arshavin [L]	27	2	8+11	1	1	0	1+1	1	3+2	0
24	GK	(Italy) ITA	Vito Mannone [L]	1	0	0	0	0	0	0	0	0+1	0
25	DF	(England) ENG	Carl Jenkinson	14	0	5+4	0	0	0	1	0	3+1	0
26	MF	(Ghana) GHA	Emmanuel Frimpong	14	0	3+3	0	0	0	3	0	3+2	0
27	FW	(Ivory Coast) CIV	Gervinho	37	4	19+9	4	1	0	0+1	0	6+1	0
28	DF	(England) ENG	Kieran Gibbs	22	2	15+1	1	0	0	1	1	4+1	0
29	FW	(Morocco) MAR	Marouane Chamakh	19	1	1+10	1	1	0	2	0	3+2	0
30	MF	(Israel) ISR	Yossi Benayoun	25	6	10+9	4	0	0	3	1	2+1	1
31	FW	(Japan) JPN	Ryo Miyaichi [L]	2	0	0	0	0	0	0+2	0	0	0
34	MF	(England) ENG	Chuks Aneke [R] [L]	1	0	0	0	0	0	0+1	0	0	0
37	DF	(England) ENG	Daniel Boateng [R]	1	0	0	0	0	0	0+1	0	0	0
39	MF	(France) FRA	Francis Coquelin	17	0	6+4	0	3	0	3	0	1	0
46	MF	(England) ENG	Henri Lansbury [L]	2	0	0+2	0	0	0	0	0	0	0
49	DF	(Spain) ESP	Ignasi Miquel [R]	9	0	1+3	0	1	0	3	0	0+1	0
52	FW	(Denmark) DEN	Nicklas Bendtner [L]	1	0	0+1	0	0	0	0	0	0	0
53	MF	(Turkey) TUR	Oğuzhan Özyakup[R]	2	0	0	0	0	0	0+2	0	0	0
56	DF	(England) ENG	Nico Yennaris [R]	3	0	0+1	0	0+1	0	1	0	0	0
	MF	(France) FRA	Samir Nasri [S]	1	0	1	0	0	0	0	0	0	0
	DF	(Senegal) SEN	Armand Traoré [S]	2	0	1	0	0	0	0	0	0+1	0

[R] – Reserve team player [L] – Out on loan [S] – Sold

=== Top scorers ===
Place	Position	Nationality	Number	Name	Premier League	FA Cup	League Cup	Champions League	Total
1	FW	(Netherlands)	10	Robin van Persie	30	2	0	5	37
2	FW	(England)	14	Theo Walcott	8	1	0	2	11
3	MF	(Spain)	8	Mikel Arteta	6	0	0	0	6
3	MF	(Israel)	30	Yossi Benayoun	4	0	1	1	6
3	DF	(Belgium)	5	Thomas Vermaelen	6	0	0	0	6
6	FW	(Ivory Coast)	27	Gervinho	4	0	0	0	4
6	FW	(England)	15	Alex Oxlade-Chamberlain	2	0	1	1	4
8	DF	(France)	6	Laurent Koscielny	2	0	0	1	3
8	MF	(Wales)	16	Aaron Ramsey	2	0	0	1	3
8	DF	(Brazil)	11	André Santos	2	0	0	1	3
11	MF	(Russia)	23	Andrey Arshavin	1	0	1	0	2
11	DF	(England)	28	Kieran Gibbs	1	0	1	0	2
11	FW	(France)	12	Thierry Henry	1^{1}	1	0	0	2^{1}
11	MF	(Czech Republic)	7	Tomáš Rosický	1	0	0	1	2
15	FW	(Morocco)	29	Marouane Chamakh	1	0	0	0	1
15	FW	(South Korea)	9	Park Chu-young	0	0	1	0	1
15	DF	(France)	3	Bacary Sagna	1	0	0	0	1
15	MF	(Cameroon)	17	Alex Song	1	0	0	0	1
				TOTALS	72	4	5	13	94

^{1}Thierry Henry originally had 3 goals accredited to his name, but the seventh goal in Arsenal's 7–1 win over Blackburn Rovers was given as an own goal to Scott Dann. This takes his club figure down to 228 goals.

=== Disciplinary record ===
Number	Nationality	Position	Name	Premier League		FA Cup		League Cup		Champions League		Total	
Number	Nationality	Position	Name	Yellow card	Red card	Yellow card	Red card	Yellow card	Red card	Yellow card	Red card	Yellow card	Red card
20	(Switzerland)	DF	Johan Djourou	4	1	1	0	0	0	2	0	7	1
26	(Ghana)	MF	Emmanuel Frimpong	1	1	0	0	0	0	1	0	2	1
25	(England)	DF	Carl Jenkinson	1	1	0	0	0	0	1	0	2	1
27	(Ivory Coast)	FW	Gervinho	0	1	0	0	0	0	0	0	0	1
17	(Cameroon)	MF	Alex Song	10	0	0	0	0	0	3	0	13	0
6	(France)	DF	Laurent Koscielny	9	0	1	0	0	0	0	0	10	0
5	(Belgium)	DF	Thomas Vermaelen	7	0	1	0	0	0	1	0	9	0
10	(Netherlands)	FW	Robin van Persie	8	0	0	0	0	0	0	0	8	0
7	(Czech Republic)	MF	Tomáš Rosický	4	0	0	0	0	0	2	0	6	0
3	(France)	DF	Bacary Sagna	2	0	1	0	0	0	3	0	6	0
8	(Spain)	MF	Mikel Arteta	4	0	0	0	0	0	1	0	5	0
16	(Wales)	MF	Aaron Ramsey	3	0	0	0	0	0	1	0	4	0
14	(England)	FW	Theo Walcott	1	0	0	0	0	0	3	0	4	0
28	(England)	DF	Kieran Gibbs	1	0	0	0	0	0	2	0	3	0
11	(Brazil)	DF	André Santos	2	0	0	0	0	0	1	0	3	0
23	(Russia)	MF	Andrey Arshavin	1	0	1	0	0	0	0	0	2	0
30	(Israel)	MF	Yossi Benayoun	1	0	0	0	0	0	1	0	2	0
39	(France)	MF	Francis Coquelin	2	0	0	0	0	0	0	0	2	0
4	(Germany)	DF	Per Mertesacker	2	0	0	0	0	0	0	0	2	0
13	(Poland)	GK	Wojciech Szczęsny	2	0	0	0	0	0	0	0	2	0
15	(England)	FW	Alex Oxlade-Chamberlain	0	0	0	0	0	0	1	0	1	0
2	(France)	MF	Abou Diaby	1	0	0	0	0	0	0	0	1	0
46	(England)	MF	Henri Lansbury	1	0	0	0	0	0	0	0	1	0
18	(France)	DF	Sébastien Squillaci	0	0	0	0	1	0	0	0	1	0
			TOTALS	66	4	5	0	1	0	22	0	94	4

=== Captains ===
No.	P	Name	Country	No. games	Notes
10	FW	van Persie	(Netherlands)	45	Club captain
5	DF	Vermaelen	(Belgium)	4	Club vice captain
17	MF	Alex Song	(Cameroon)	1	Club 3rd captain
8	MF	Arteta	(Spain)	1	
7	MF	Rosický	(Czech Republic)	1	
20	DF	Djourou	(Switzerland)	1	
30	MF	Benayoun	(Israel)	1	

Last updated: 13 May 2012
Source: Competitive match reports.
Competitive matches only
Matches started as captain only
Country: FIFA nationality; No.: Squad number; P: Position; Name: Player name; No. Games: Number of games started as captain.

== Awards ==
=== Premier League Manager of the Month award ===
Awarded monthly to the manager that was chosen by a panel assembled by the Premier League's sponsor

Month	Manager
February	(France) Arsène Wenger

=== Premier League Player of the Month award ===
Awarded monthly to the player that was chosen by a panel assembled by the Premier League's sponsor

Month	Player
October	(Netherlands) Robin van Persie

=== PFA Players' Player of the Year award ===
Awarded to the player who is adjudged to have been the best throughout the Premier League season, by the Professional Footballers' Association (PFA).

Season	Player
2011–12	(Netherlands) Robin van Persie

=== PFA Fans' Player of the Year award ===
Awarded to the player who is adjudged to have been the best throughout the Premier League season, by the Professional Footballers' Association's (PFA) fans.

Season	Player
2011–12	(Netherlands) Robin van Persie

=== PFA Team of the Year award ===
Awarded to the players who are adjudged to have been the best throughout the Premier League season, by the Professional Footballers' Association (PFA).

Position	Player
Forward	(Netherlands) Robin van Persie

=== FWA Footballer of the Year award ===
Awarded to the player who is adjudged to have been the best throughout the Premier League season, by the Football Writers' Association (FWA).

Season	Player
2011–12	(Netherlands) Robin van Persie

=== Premier League Golden Boot award ===
Awarded to the player who has scored the most goals throughout the Premier League season.

Player	Goals
Robin van Persie (Netherlands)	30

=== 20th Anniversary Barclay Premier League Awards ===
==== Best Squad in the Premier League award ====
Awarded to the squad who is adjudged to have been the best throughout the history of the Premier League, by a panel assembled by the Premier League's sponsor.

== See also ==
- 2011–12 in English football
- List of Arsenal F.C. seasons
