= 2022–23 Arsenal F.C. season =

English football club season

Arsenal F.C.
2022–23 season
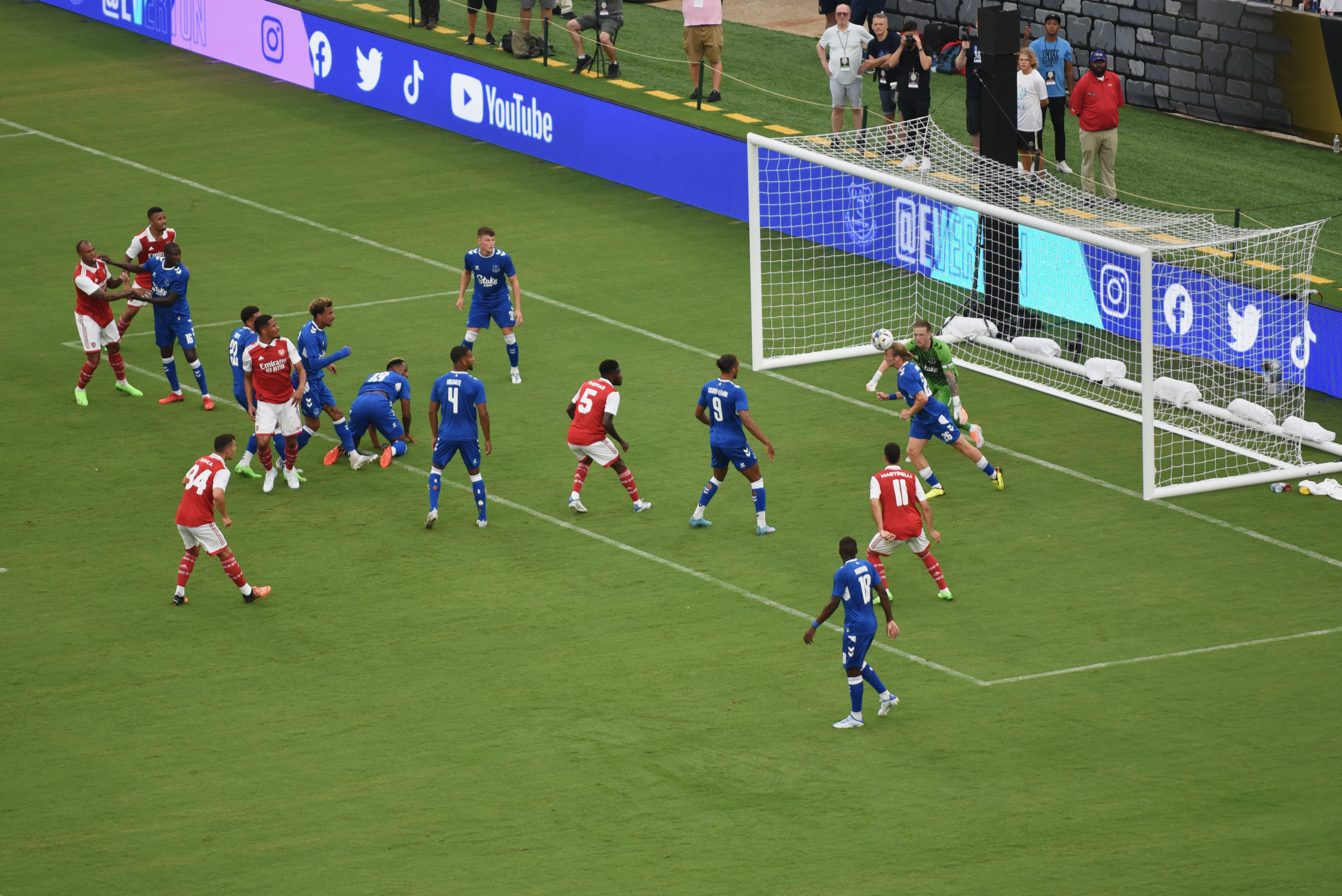
- Arsenal playing against Everton during pre-season
- Owner: Kroenke Sports & Entertainment
- Co-chairmen: Stan Kroenke; Josh Kroenke (from 15 March 2023)
- Manager: Mikel Arteta
- Stadium: Emirates Stadium
- Premier League: 2nd
- FA Cup: Fourth round
- EFL Cup: Third round
- UEFA Europa League: Round of 16
- Top goalscorer: League: Gabriel Martinelli; Martin Ødegaard (15 each); All: Gabriel Martinelli; Martin Ødegaard; Bukayo Saka (15 each)
- Highest home attendance: 60,325 v Manchester United (22 January 2023, Premier League)
- Lowest home attendance: 48,500 v Zürich (3 November 2022, Europa League)
- Average home league attendance: 60,191
- Biggest win: 5–0 v Nottingham Forest (Home, 30 October 2022, Premier League); 5–0 v Wolverhampton Wanderers (Home, 28 May 2023, Premier League)
- Biggest defeat: 1–4 v Manchester City (Away, 26 April 2023, Premier League); 0–3 v Brighton & Hove Albion (Home, 14 May 2023, Premier League)
| Home colours | Away colours | Third colours |

The 2022–23 season was Arsenal Football Club's 31st season in the Premier League, their 97th consecutive season in the top flight of English football and 106th season in the top flight overall. In addition to the domestic league, Arsenal also participated in this season's editions of the FA Cup, EFL Cup and UEFA Europa League, the latter of which was their 37th European campaign.

Managed by Mikel Arteta in his third full season, Arsenal were the second-youngest team in the Premier League with an average starting age of 25 years and 52 days. Following eliminations from the FA Cup, EFL Cup and UEFA Europa League, they finished second in the Premier League and qualified for next season's UEFA Champions League after a six-year absence.

The season covers the period from 1 July 2022 to 30 June 2023. Notably, the fixture dates of domestic and European competitions were altered to accommodate the FIFA World Cup played in November and December 2022 in Qatar.

== Review ==
=== Background ===
On 20 December 2019, Arsenal appointed former club captain Mikel Arteta – who was 37 years old then and had never managed before – as the new head coach on a three-and-a-half-year deal. The 2019–20 season had been defined by a three-month lull between March and June, caused by the COVID-19 pandemic; and when it returned, it was behind closed doors. The Gunners finished the league season in eighth place – far from a European qualification spot; but they earned a record-extending 14th FA Cup win on 1 August 2020, helping them qualify for next season's Europa League, and making Arteta the first person to win the FA Cup as both captain and coach of the club.

The 2020–21 season was heavily affected by the COVID-19 pandemic, as lots of domestic and European games were played behind closed doors. After Arsenal triumphed in the 2020 FA Community Shield, Arteta's title was changed to manager. On 26 December 2020, the Gunners recorded an important victory at home against Chelsea to end their seven-game run without a win in the Premier League and relieve the pressure on Arteta. On 18 April 2021, Arsenal were announced as a founding club of the breakaway European competition The Super League; they withdrew from the competition two days later amid near-universal condemnation. The Gunners finished the season in eighth place once again, this time not qualifying for a European competition for the first time in 25 years.

The 2021–22 season, which was documented in the Amazon Prime Video series All or Nothing: Arsenal, was a rollercoaster season for the Gunners. With their three consecutive defeats without scoring a goal to open the Premier League campaign, the club dropped to 20th, sitting at the bottom of the table, which was their worst start to a season for 67 years. Since then, a new look Arsenal started to emerge, with several academy graduates and new signings making a major impact. In fact, the Gunners were the youngest team in the 2021–22 Premier League with an average starting age of 24 years and 308 days – more than a whole year younger than the next team. Arteta's Arsenal rebuild on and off the pitch began to take shape in this season, with the Gunners moving into the top four for several times between December 2021 and May 2022. On 6 May 2022, the club announced that the Spaniard had signed a new contract to the end of the 2024–25 campaign. Arsenal finished the league season in fifth place, narrowly missing out on Champions League football.

=== Pre-season ===
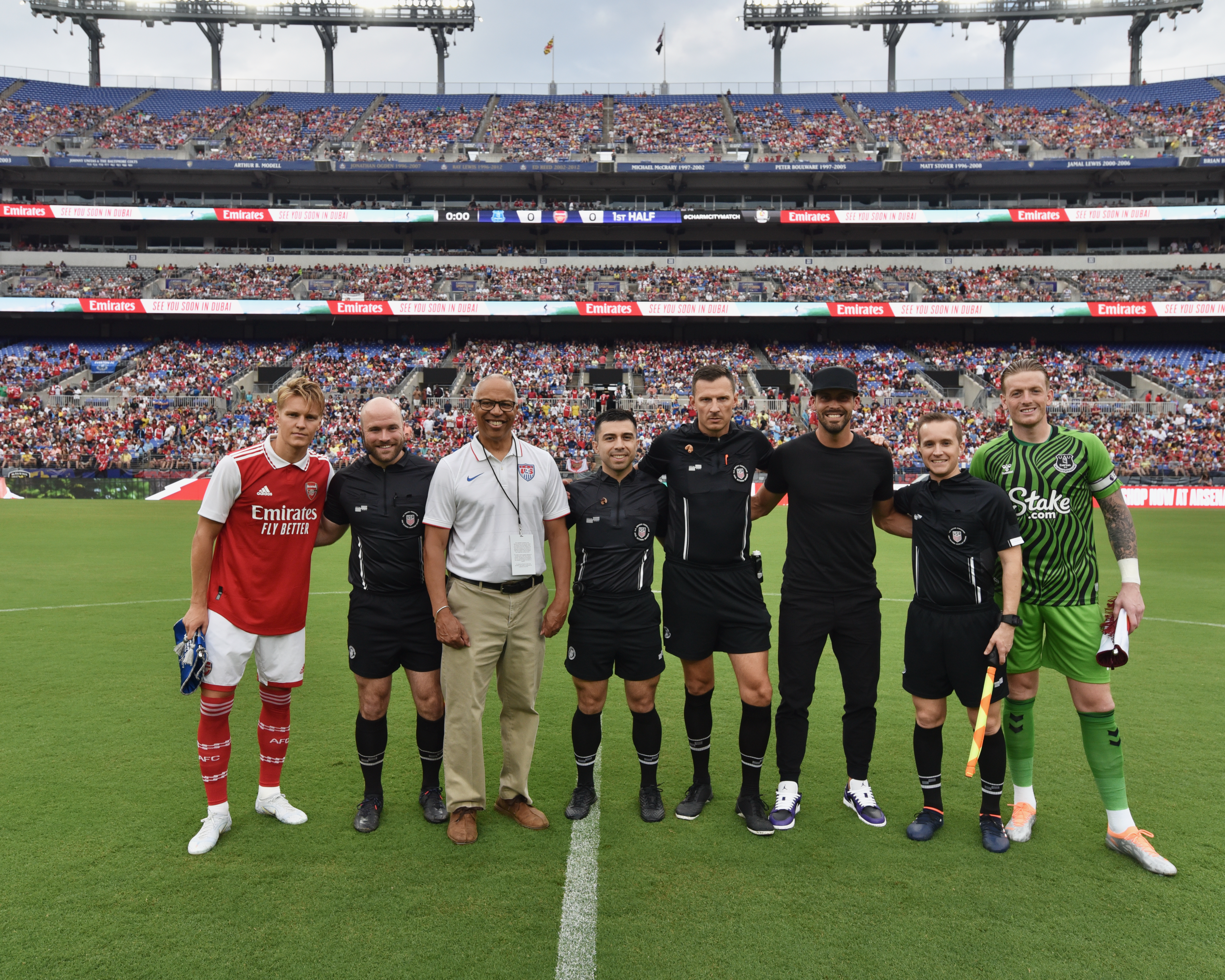
Arsenal captain Ødegaard (left) with Everton captain Jordan Pickford (right) ahead of Arsenal's pre-season friendly with Everton

It was reported on 29 June 2022 that the first-team players who were not in action for their respective countries since the end of the previous campaign were back to the London Colney training ground for pre-season training.

On 4 July, the Gunners travelled to Germany for a small training camp at Adidas headquarters in Herzogenaurach. Five academy players – Salah-Eddine Oulad M'Hand, Charlie Patino, Matt Smith, Lino Sousa and Reuell Walters – were with the first-team squad.

Four days later, Arsenal faced 2. Bundesliga side 1. FC Nürnberg at Max-Morlock-Stadion in Nuremberg. New signings Gabriel Jesus, Marquinhos and Matt Turner made their non-competitive debuts for the club in a 5–3 win. They returned to England on the next day.

On 11 July, Arsenal confirmed that the internationals who were in action for their respective countries in June were all back to London Colney. Two days later, manager Arteta named a 33-man squad for the trip to the United States where they would play three more friendlies. The 17-year-old defender Reuell Walters was the only academy player to travel with the first team to the US.

The Gunners faced fellow Premier League side Everton at M&T Bank Stadium in Baltimore, Maryland on 16 July. Gabriel Jesus and Bukayo Saka both scored one goal in the first half, helping the team win 2–0. Four days later, Arsenal took on Major League Soccer side Orlando City at Exploria Stadium in Orlando, Florida. The Gunners won 3–1 with Gabriel Martinelli scoring the opener, Eddie Nketiah scoring the second, and Reiss Nelson scoring the third.

On 23 July, the club played their third and final game of the USA tour – also the final game of the 2022 Florida Cup series – against Premier League side Chelsea at Camping World Stadium in Orlando. New signing Oleksandr Zinchenko made his non-competitive debut for Arsenal. In the 15th minute, Gabriel Jesus put the Gunners ahead with his fourth goal of pre-season. On 36 minutes, Martin Ødegaard added a further goal by sliding his shot low into the net. Saka scored the third shortly after the hour mark. Albert Sambi Lokonga headed in a cross from Cédric Soares at the far post in the closing stages, making the score 4–0. Arsenal ended the 10-day trip to America with winning the Florida Cup.

The Gunners finished their pre-season campaign by thrashing La Liga side Sevilla 6–0 to claim the 2022 Emirates Cup on 30 July. The match saw four goals in the opening 20 minutes, courtesy of braces from Saka and Gabriel Jesus, with the Brazilian completing his treble on 77 minutes before Nketiah netted in the final minute.

Before the start of the game against Sevilla, Arsenal announced that Ødegaard was named their new men's first-team captain.

==== First-team transfers (summer transfer window) ====
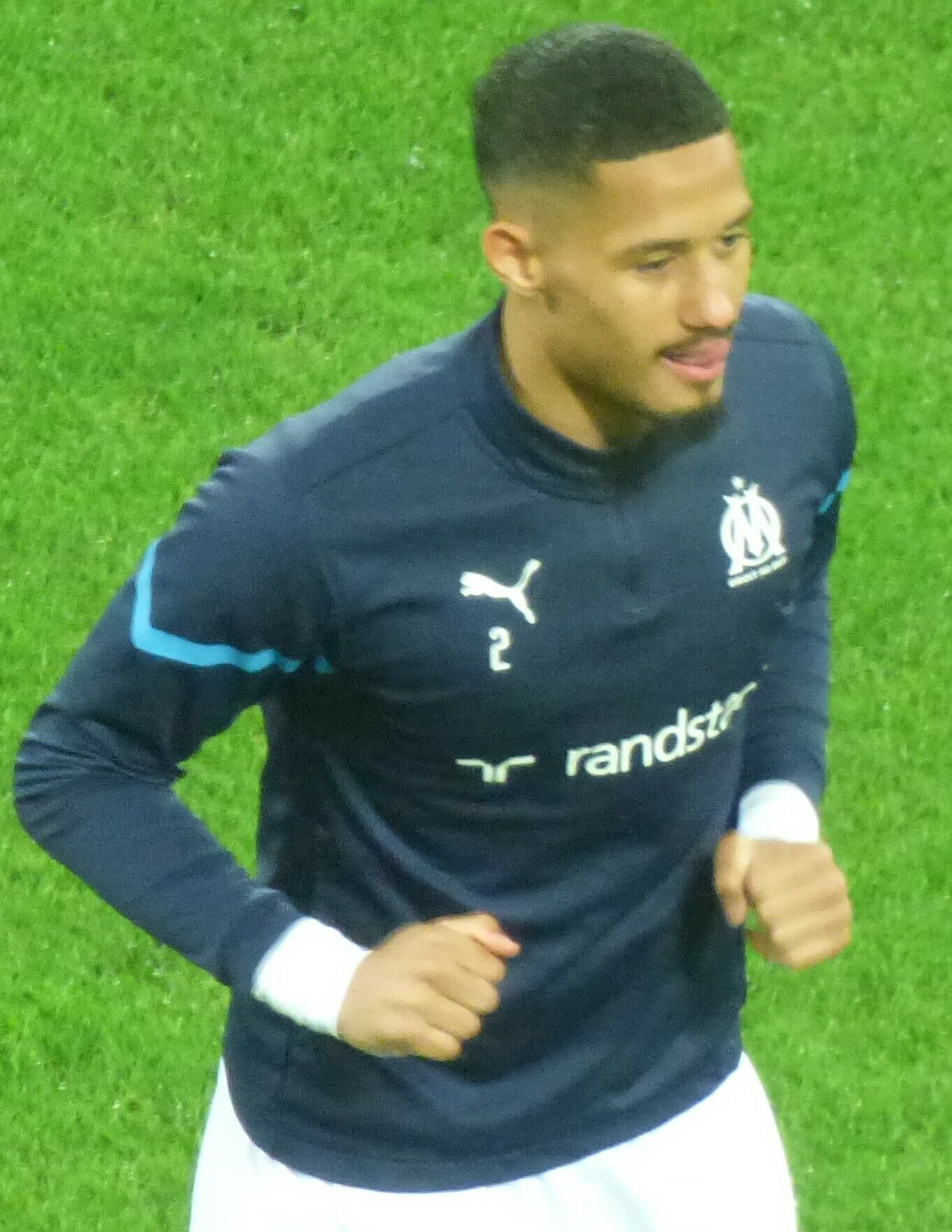
Saliba with Marseille in January 2022

In the previous season, French centre-back William Saliba spent a year on loan with Marseille in Ligue 1. During his time with Marseille, Saliba made 52 appearances in all competitions, and helped the club to second in the league, whilst also reaching the semi-finals of the inaugural Europa Conference League season. Saliba was named as Ligue 1 Young Player of the Year and was awarded a position in the Team of the Year. He also won his first caps for France. In early June 2022, Saliba confirmed he would return to north London from his Marseille loan spell. He would wear the number 12 shirt from the 2022–23 season.

On 19 May 2022, three days before the last game of the 2021–22 season, Arsenal announced that Greek defender Konstantinos Mavropanos joined Bundesliga side VfB Stuttgart on a permanent transfer. On 24 May, the club confirmed that Egyptian midfielder Mohamed Elneny had signed a new contract. On 10 June, Arsenal announced that they were to release nine players, two of whom, Alexandre Lacazette and Nketiah, made men's first-team appearances for the Gunners. Eight days later, the club confirmed English striker and academy graduate Nketiah signed a new long-term contract, and would wear the number 14 shirt from the 2022–23 season, having previously worn the number 30. The departure of French midfielder Matteo Guendouzi to Ligue 1 side Marseille was announced on 1 July. Two weeks later, the Gunners confirmed American defender Auston Trusty joined EFL Championship side Birmingham City F.C. on a season-long loan.

Arsenal announced their first signing of the summer transfer window on 10 June, with 19-year-old Brazilian forward Marquinhos joining the club on a long-term contract from Série A side São Paulo. Eleven days later, the club announced the signing of 22-year-old Portuguese midfielder Fábio Vieira from Primeira Liga side Porto. He was given the number 21 shirt.

On 27 June, the Gunners confirmed that 28-year-old American goalkeeper Matt Turner had joined the club from Major League Soccer side New England Revolution, and would wear the number 30 shirt. As of June 2022, Turner had made 18 appearances for the United States. He wore the number one shirt and played every game as USA won the 2021 CONCACAF Gold Cup as hosts, keeping five clean sheets in the tournament, and earning the Golden Glove award. He was also honoured as MLS Goalkeeper of the Year in 2021. Turner has been an Arsenal fan since his teenage years.

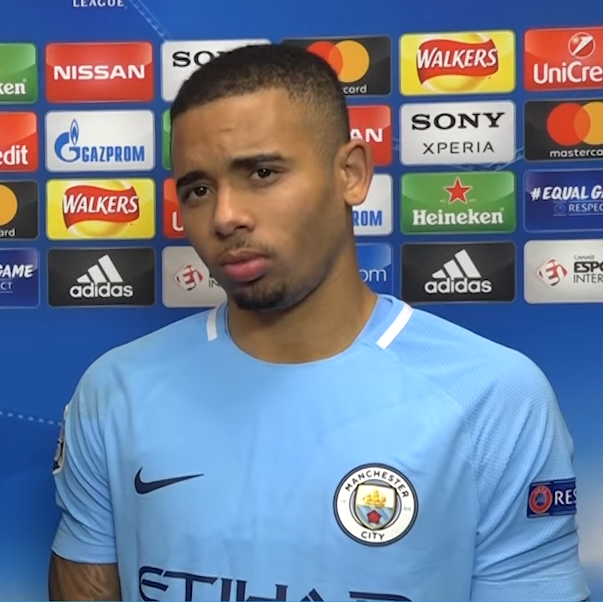
Jesus with Manchester City in 2018

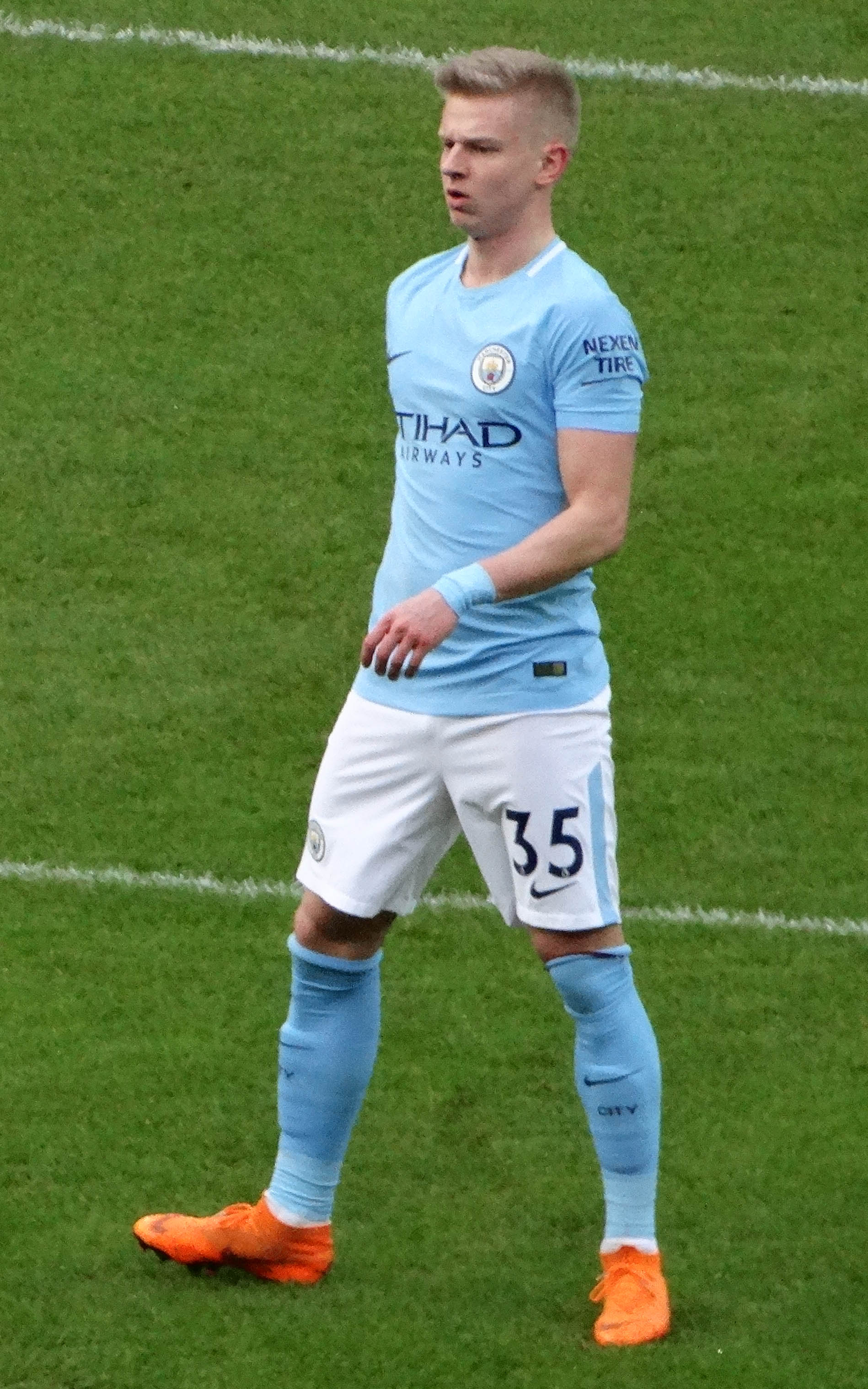
Zinchenko playing for Manchester City in 2018

In July 2022, the Gunners announced two signings of notable players from fellow Premier League side Manchester City, where Arteta spent three years and a half at as an assistant coach to Pep Guardiola before returning to Arsenal as head coach. On 4 July, 25-year-old Brazilian striker Gabriel Jesus joined Arsenal on a long-term contract, and was assigned the number 9 shirt. With the ability to play in several attacking positions, he is one of the leading strikers in the Premier League during his six seasons in Manchester City. On 22 July, 25-year-old Ukrainian left-sided player and Arsenal supporter Oleksandr Zinchenko, who is comfortable operating in midfield and defence, joined the club on a long-term contract, and would wear the number 35 shirt. Gabriel Jesus and Zinchenko had both won four Premier League titles, the FA Cup and a number of EFL Cups as Manchester City players. Manager Arteta believed that Gabriel Jesus and Zinchenko would help bring a winning mentality to the young squad.

The Gunners continued their summer exodus after signing five players. In late July, the club announced the loan departures of English goalkeeper and academy graduate Arthur Okonkwo and Portuguese defender Nuno Tavares to League Two side Crewe Alexandra and Ligue 1 side Marseille respectively.

On 2 August, Arsenal announced German goalkeeper Bernd Leno, who had made 125 appearances for the club in all competitions, joined fellow Premier League side Fulham on a permanent transfer. On the next day, the Gunners confirmed English goalkeeper Aaron Ramsdale took the number one shirt, moving from his previous number 32 following Leno's move to Fulham.

The departures of five first-team players were announced afterwards, as English forward and academy graduate Folarin Balogun joined Ligue 1 side Reims on a one-year loan, Uruguayan midfielder Lucas Torreira completed his transfer to Süper Lig side Galatasaray, Spanish defender Pablo Marí joined Serie A side AC Monza on a one-year loan deal, Icelandic goalkeeper Rúnar Alex Rúnarsson joined Süper Lig side Alanyaspor on loan for the 2022–23 season, and Ivorian winger Nicolas Pépé joined Ligue 1 side OGC Nice on a season-long loan.

On transfer deadline day, 1 September, two first-team players departed the club. English midfielder and academy graduate Ainsley Maitland-Niles joined fellow Premier League side Southampton on a one-year loan. Spanish defender and academy graduate Héctor Bellerín, who had made 239 first-team appearances in all competitions and won three FA Cups with the club, joined La Liga side Barcelona on a permanent transfer.

After the summer transfer window closed, there were twenty-four players in the first-team squad: three goalkeepers, eight defenders, six midfielders, and seven forwards. Eight first-team players were out on loan.

=== August ===
The team began their campaign with a London derby away against Crystal Palace at Selhurst Park, managed by former Arsenal captain Patrick Vieira. Returning loanee Saliba and new signings Gabriel Jesus and Zinchenko made their competitive debuts for the team in a 2–0 win. Martinelli opened the scoring in the 20th minute, becoming the first Brazilian to net a season-opening goal of a Premier League campaign. In the 85th minute, Saka's cross was deflected home by Marc Guéhi to ensure Arteta registered his 50th league victory, making him the second-quickest manager to reach 50 top-flight wins for Arsenal after Arsène Wenger. Eight days later, the club played their first home match of the season against Leicester City. Gabriel Jesus netted twice in the first half on his home debut, becoming the first player to score more than once on his home Premier League debut for Arsenal. Granit Xhaka and Martinelli also scored in a 4–2 win.

On 20 August, Arsenal faced newly-promoted Bournemouth away at Dean Court. While Ødegaard netted twice within the opening 11 minutes, Saliba scored his first for the club in the 54th minute, sealing a 3–0 victory. The win vaulted them to the top of the Premier League for the first time since 17 January 2016. Saka became the second-youngest player to play 100 times for the club in the Premier League, behind Cesc Fàbregas.

On 26 August, the draw for the Europa League group stage was made. Arsenal were drawn in Group A, along with Dutch club PSV Eindhoven, Norwegian champions Bodø/Glimt and Swiss champions Zürich. A day later, the Gunners played at home against newly promoted Fulham. Kieran Tierney and Elneny made their first Premier League starts of the season. Arsenal conceded first, after a Gabriel Magalhães error in the 56th minute, but Ødegaard equalised eight minutes later and Gabriel redeemed himself with a scrambled finish in the 85th minute. The win marked Arteta's 100th Premier League game in charge. It was reported on 30 August that Elneny had suffered a significant injury in the match against Fulham, and would be out for two months.

Arsenal's last match of the month was against 15th-placed Aston Villa at home on 31 August. Albert Sambi Lokonga was handed his first start of the season as he replaced the injured Elneny. Two goals, from Jesus and Martinelli, secured a 2-1 victory, Arsenal's 200th league win since moving to Emirates Stadium in 2006. It was the fourth time Arsenal had started a top-flight season with a run of five wins, after 1930–31, 1947–48 and 2004–05. Arteta became the 11th manager to have won the first five games of a Premier League season, after Kevin Keegan, Carlo Ancelotti, Alex Ferguson, Arsène Wenger, Alan Curbishley, José Mourinho, Manuel Pellegrini, Pep Guardiola, Maurizio Sarri, and Jürgen Klopp. He was named Premier League Manager of the Month for the third time.

=== September ===
The club started September with a 1–3 defeat at Old Trafford to rivals Manchester United on 4 September, seeing their five-game winning start to the Premier League season come to an end. Zinchenko returned to the starting line-up, while Arsenal's first two defensive midfielders – Partey and Elneny – were still injured. Two strikes from Marcus Rashford and one from Antony secured a United win; despite the loss, Arsenal remained top of the table. It was reported on 21 December that a disallowed opener from Martinelli was one of six incorrect VAR interventions before the league halted for the World Cup. The Gunners began their fifth Europa League campaign on 8 September with a trip to Switzerland in a group stage match against Zürich, the reigning Swiss Super League champions. This was the first time the two teams played each other in a European game. New signings Marquinhos and Turner made their competitive debuts, and fellow new recruit Vieira got his full debut in a 2–1 win. At half-time, the news broke of the death of Queen Elizabeth II, and Arsenal's players returned to the field wearing black armbands in respect, while a minute's silence was held before the start of the second half.

Arsenal's home fixture against Everton, which was originally due to be played on 11 September, was postponed two days beforehand as a mark of respect following the passing of the Queen. The Europa League group stage match between Arsenal and Eredivisie side PSV Eindhoven, originally scheduled to be played on 15 September, was also postponed due to organisational issues. The league match between Arsenal and Manchester City, originally scheduled for 19 October, was postponed to accommodate the rearranged fixture.

Ahead of the first international break of the season, the Gunners faced eighth-placed Brentford away at Brentford Community Stadium on 18 September. Before kick-off, there was a minute's silence in tribute to Queen Elizabeth II, followed by a rendition of the national anthem "God Save the King". Vieira scored his first Premier League goal in a 3-0 win, with Saliba and Jesus also scoring two headers. As a schoolboy midfielder at the age of 15 years and 181 days, Ethan Nwaneri came off the bench to replace Vieira in second-half stoppage time. He became the youngest player to ever appear in the Premier League – breaking the record previously held by Harvey Elliott, and the all-time English top-flight record held since August 1964 by former Sunderland goalkeeper Derek Forster, by three days. He also became Arsenal's youngest-ever player in any senior competition, breaking the previous record of 16 years and 177 days, set by Cesc Fàbregas in the 2003–04 League Cup.

On 29 September, Arsenal announced that academy graduate Emile Smith Rowe had undergone surgery to repair a damaged tendon in his groin. He would return to full training in December.

=== October ===
On 1 October, following the international break, the club played the North London derby at home against Tottenham. Partey opened the scoring in the 20th minute with a shot from 25 yards, the first time he had scored from outside the box in 65 attempts for Arsenal. Although Spurs equalised in the 31st minute from a Harry Kane penalty, Jesus and Xhaka scored in the second half to take a 3-1 victory. The win kept Arsenal on top of the Premier League table, and meant that it was the first time the club had won three consecutive league home games against their rivals since September 2013. A Europa League game against Bodø/Glimt, the defending Eliteserien champions, followed on 6 October at home. Arsenal won 3–0, sending them top of their Europa League group.

On 9 October, the club faced ninth-placed Liverpool, a team that Arsenal had only won one of their last 14 Premier League matches against since the 2015–16 season and had failed to score in their past six meetings with in all competitions. The Gunners took the lead after just 58 seconds when Martinelli tucked the ball home, but Liverpool equalised through Darwin Núñez in the 34th minute. Arsenal reclaimed the lead shortly before half-time through Saka, but Liverpool again got back on terms through substitute Roberto Firmino in the 53rd minute. Saka nevertheless scored a decisive penalty in the 76th minute, making the score 3–2, and sealing the Gunners' first win over Liverpool since July 2020. Four days later, the Gunners faced Bodø/Glimt away. The game took place on an artificial pitch at Aspmyra Stadion, where the Norwegian team had won each of their last 14 home matches in European competition. The Gunners won 1–0.

Arsenal continued their league campaign on 16 October, facing 14th-placed Leeds United away at Elland Road. The game saw goalkeeper Ramsdale produce a man of the match display as the Gunners won 1–0. Saka scored the winning goal from a tight angle in the 35th minute, assisted by Ødegaard; Leeds striker Patrick Bamford missed a penalty midway through the second half. Having won nine of their first ten league games for the first time ever, Arsenal moved four points clear at the top of the league. On 20 October, the Gunners played the postponed Europa League match at home to Dutch side PSV Eindhoven. Xhaka's 70th minute strike sealed a third-straight 1-0 victory. The win ensured Arsenal qualified for the Europa League knockout stage with two group games to spare. On the next day, the club announced that centre-back Gabriel Magalhães had signed a new long-term contract. On 23 October, Arsenal faced 14th-placed Southampton at St Mary's Stadium. The eight-game winning run was ended, as Xhaka's 11th-minute opener was cancelled out by Stuart Armstrong's second-half leveller, in the club's first draw in 28 Premier League matches since January 2022.

Four days later, the Gunners suffered a 2-0 away defeat against PSV Eindhoven at Philips Stadion, the first time the Gunners had suffered an away defeat in the Europa League group stage since November 2017. Arsenal's ninth match of the month was against newly promoted Nottingham Forest at home on 30 October. Before and during the game, the team paid tribute to their on-loan defender Pablo Marí, who was recovering after being stabbed in an Italian supermarket on 27 October. Substitute Reiss Nelson scored twice in the second half after a Martinelli opener, while Partey and Ødegaard added gloss in a 5-0 win.

=== November ===
On 3 November, the Gunners hosted Swiss side Zürich at Emirates Stadium in their final Europa League group game. In the 17th minute, Tierney scored the only goal of the game with a left-footed shot from 20 yards to the bottom right corner, helping the team win 1–0. They would go straight into the Europa League round of 16 in March 2023, skipping the knockout play-off round in February. Arsenal went on to face rivals Chelsea at Stamford Bridge on 6 November, a match that saw manager Arteta reach 150 games in all competitions – the same number of appearances he made for the Gunners as a player. Zinchenko was back in the starting line-up after missing nine games with a calf injury. Gabriel Magalhães's close-range finish from Saka's corner in the 63rd minute earned the visitors a 1–0 win. This was Arteta's 87th victory in charge of Arsenal – more than any of his predecessors, including George Graham and Wenger, over the equivalent period.

Three days later, the Gunners entered the EFL Cup in the third round, facing Premier League side Brighton & Hove Albion at home. The 20-year-old Estonia international keeper and academy graduate Karl Hein made his competitive debut for the first team and started in goal, becoming the fourth Estonian to start for a Premier League side. Although Nketiah opened the scoring, three Brighton goals from Danny Welbeck, Kaoru Mitoma, Tariq Lamptey saw the visitors win 3–1 and end the Gunners' 12-match winning run at home. This was the second time in 20 seasons that Arsenal had failed to progress past the third round of the EFL Cup (formerly League Cup). On 12 November, Arteta's side played their last game before the World Cup break against 19th-placed Wolverhampton Wanderers away at Molineux Stadium. Captain Ødegaard scored two goals without response, taking the team five points clear at the top of the table and ensuring they would be first on Christmas Day for the first time since 2007.

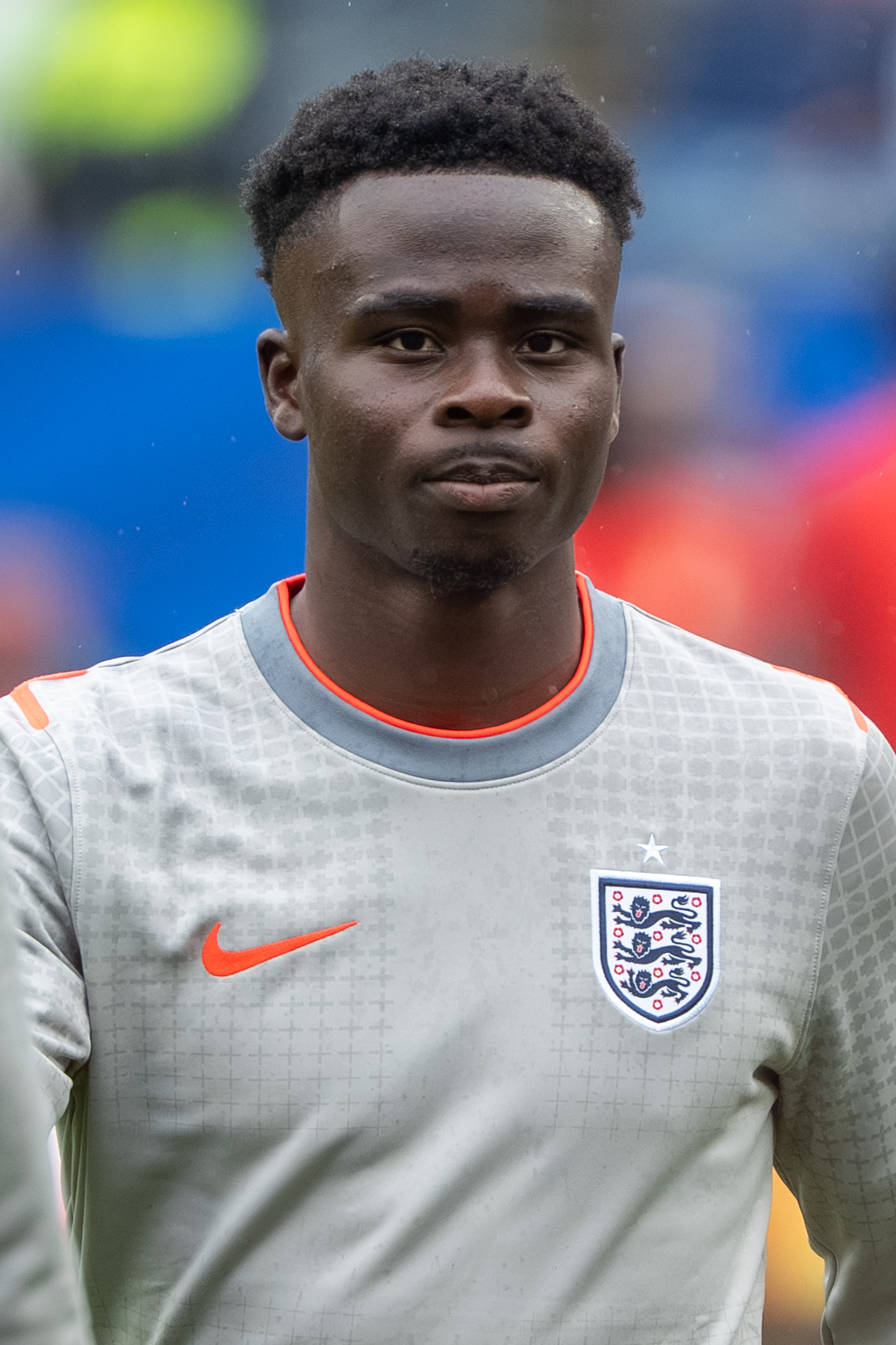
Saka with England at the 2026 FIFA World Cup

The 2022 FIFA World Cup took place in Qatar from 20 November to 18 December. Ten Arsenal players were named in squads for the tournament: Gabriel Jesus and Martinelli (Brazil), Ramsdale, Saka and White (England), Saliba (France), Partey (Ghana), Tomiyasu (Japan), Xhaka (as Switzerland's captain), and Turner (United States), of whom six (Saka, Turner, Tomiyasu, Partey, Martinelli, and Saliba) made their World Cup debuts. Only Saliba's France reached the World Cup final on 18 December, in which they were defeated.

=== December ===
On 4 December, manager Arteta named a 27-man squad – including thirteen academy players – for the trip to the United Arab Emirates, where they would play two friendlies in the Dubai Super Cup. Two days later, Arsenal confirmed that striker Gabriel Jesus had undergone surgery to his right knee after suffering an injury during Brazil's World Cup group stage match against Cameroon on 2 December. The club did not give any timescale on his return. The Gunners faced Ligue 1 side Lyon in Dubai on 8 December, winning 3-0. They played their second game in Dubai against Serie A side Milan on 13 December, winning 2-1 and claiming the Dubai Super Cup. After flying back to England, Arsenal lost 2-0 to Serie A side Juventus in their final friendly at Emirates Stadium on 17 December.

The Gunners' first league action after the World Cup was a Boxing Day fixture at home against 16th-placed West Ham United, on the anniversary of Arteta's first game as Arsenal manager. The Hammers opened the scoring with a Saïd Benrahma penalty in the 27th minute, but Saka's 53rd minute equaliser, Martinelli's low shot, and Nketiah's calm finish secured a 3-1 victory. Former 22-year manager Wenger watched a game at the stadium for the first time since leaving the club in May 2018.

On New Year's Eve, Arsenal travelled to the south coast of England to play their final game of 2022 – also the last Premier League fixture of the year – against 7th-placed Brighton & Hove Albion. Before kick-off, there was a minute's applause in tribute to Pelé, who had died on 29 December. Goals from Saka, Ødegaard, and Nketiah put Arsenal three goals up, before Mitoma reduced the deficit for the Seagulls in the 65th minute. Martinelli scored six minutes later, and although Evan Ferguson pulled a goal back, the 4-2 victory took Arsenal seven points clear at the top of the table, the fifth team in English top-flight history to pick up as many as 43 points from the first 16 games in a season. Arteta picked up his second Premier League Manager of the Month award of the campaign, winning the award for the fourth time in his career. Ødegaard won the Premier League Player of the Month award, the first Arsenal player to do so since Pierre-Emerick Aubameyang in September 2019. It was also the first time since March 2015 the club scooped both awards, when manager Arsène Wenger and striker Olivier Giroud were the recipients.

=== January ===
Arsenal started 2023 with a home game against third-placed Newcastle on 3 January, hoping to extend their advantage over Manchester City. However, neither team was able to break the deadlock and the game finished 0–0. Six days later, the Gunners entered the FA Cup in the third round, facing League One side Oxford United away at Kassam Stadium. The opener came from Elneny and was followed by a brace from Nketiah, in a 3-0 win. On 15 January, Arsenal faced rivals Tottenham at Tottenham Hotspur Stadium in the second North London derby of the season. Saka's cross was deflected home by Spurs goalkeeper Lloris in the 14th minute, while Ødegaard doubled Arsenal's lead with a long-range strike later in the first half. Arsenal keeper Aaron Ramsdale produced a man of the match display with seven saves, helping his side record the first clean sheet in North London derbies since Arteta took charge of Arsenal in December 2019. Having secured their first league double over Tottenham since the 2013–14 season, Arsenal moved eight points clear of City. An incident at the end of the game, in which Ramsdale was kicked in the back by a Tottenham supporter who had jumped onto the advertising hoarding, was strongly criticised by the Professional Footballers' Association, the Football Association, and the Premier League said: "There is no place in football for acts of violence, and under no circumstance should players be attacked or fear for their safety at games." The supporter was subsequently banned from football matches for four years.

On 22 January, Arsenal faced rivals Manchester United, the only team that had beaten them in the Premier League this season up until that point, at home. In the 17th minute, Rashford gave United the lead with a long-range strike, but Nketiah levelled seven minutes later. On 53 minutes, Saka cut in from the right and arrowed a shot across United goalkeeper David de Gea into the far corner of the goal, before Lisandro Martínez looped a header into the net six minutes later. In the 90th minute, the ball came loose in the area and Nketiah was able to steer it home, sealing a 3-2 victory. The win gave the Gunners a five-point advantage at the top of the Premier League with a game in hand.

The Gunners headed to face Manchester City on 27 January at Etihad Stadium in the FA Cup fourth round. New recruit Trossard was handed his first Arsenal start, and Kiwior was named on the bench following his signing with the club earlier in the week. In the 64th minute, Nathan Aké scored the only goal of the tight game with a low shot, helping the hosts win 1–0. On 31 January, the club announced that midfielder Elneny had undergone surgery to his right knee after suffering a significant injury in a training session. He would be out for an extended period of time. Arteta was named Premier League Manager of the Month for the third time in the season. He was the first manager to win the award in successive months since Manchester City's Guardiola did so in November and December 2021. Arteta also became the first Arsenal manager to win the award three times in a single campaign.

==== First-team transfers (winter transfer window) ====
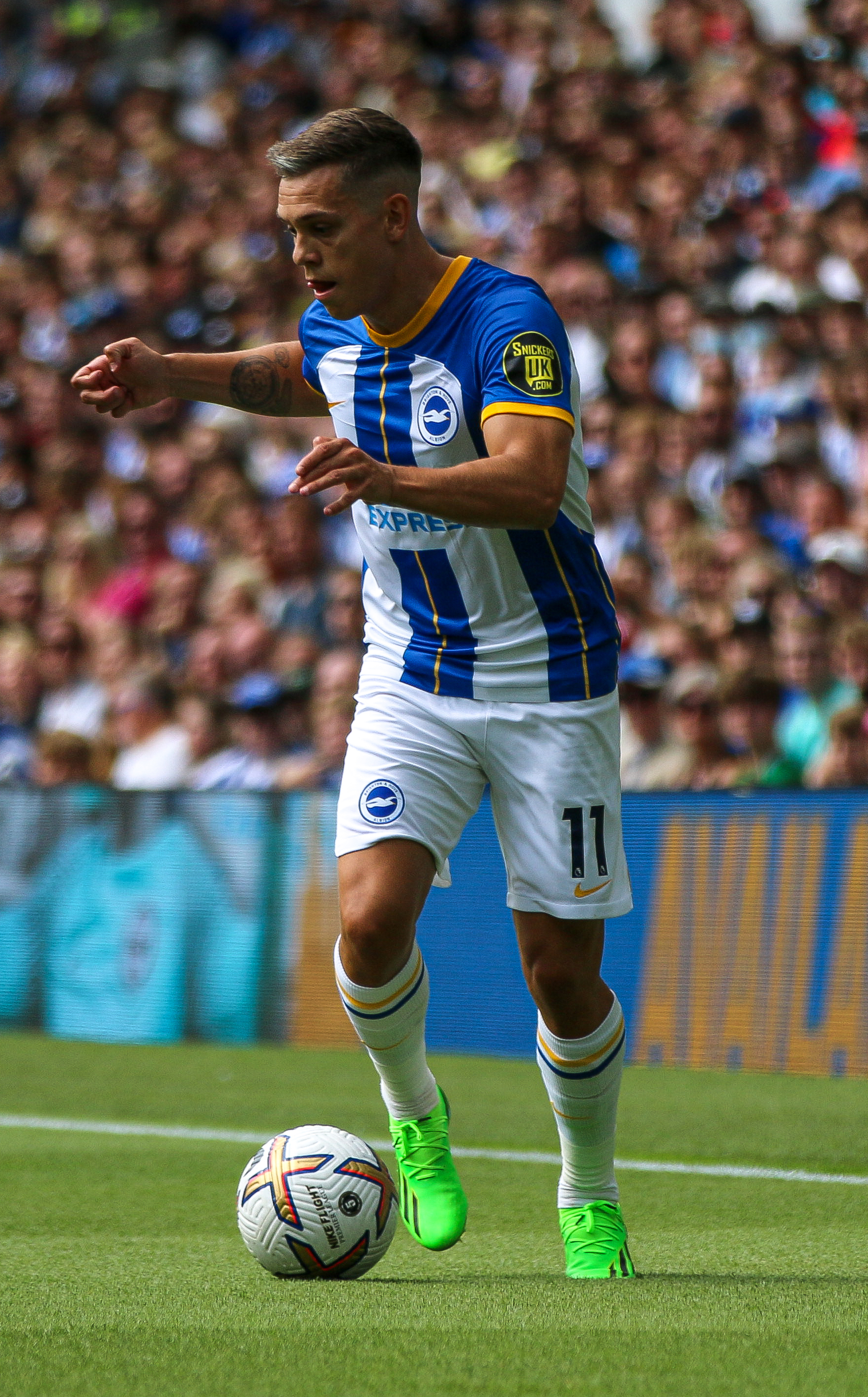
Trossard playing for Brighton & Hove Albion in 2022

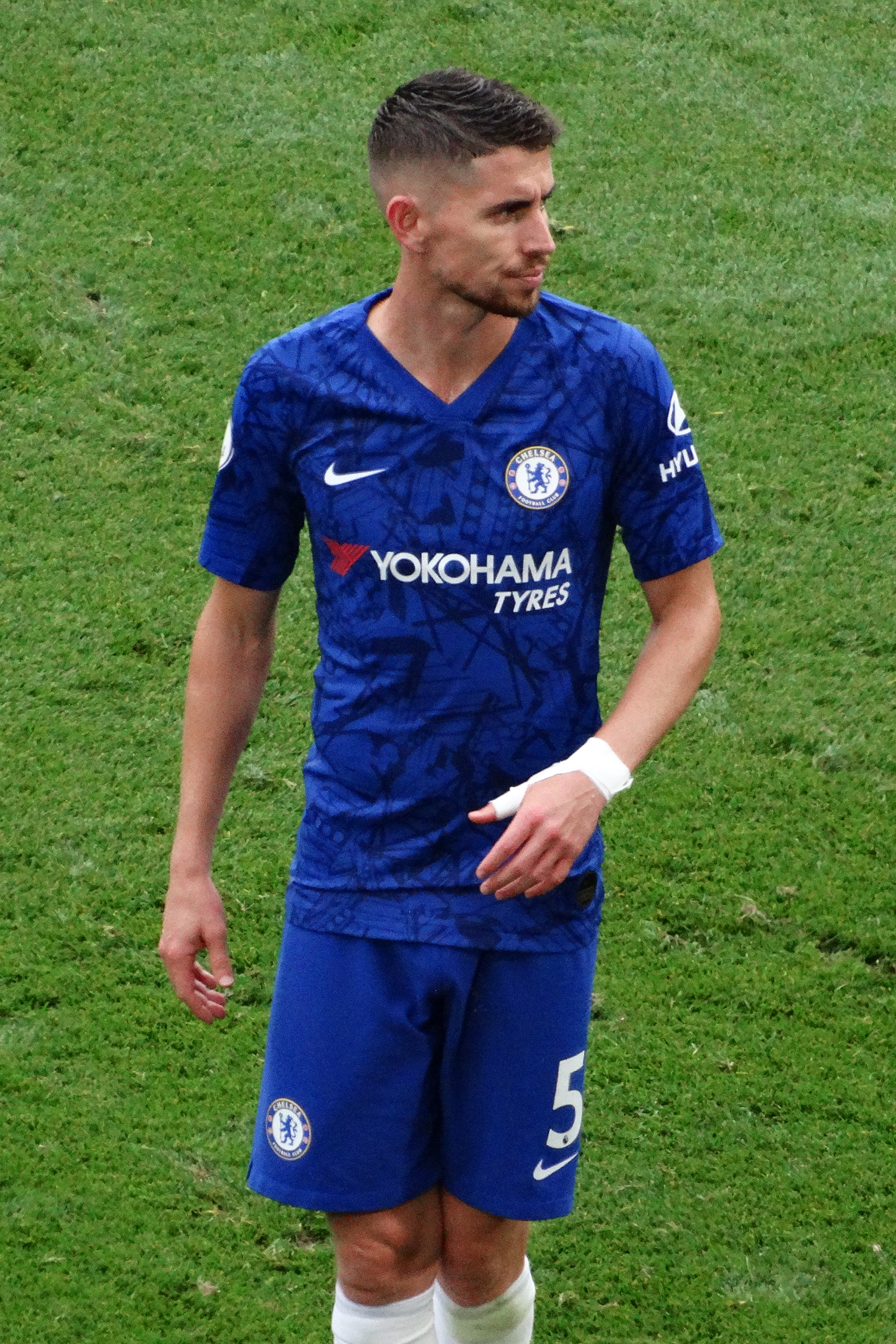
Jorginho with Chelsea in 2019

On 16 January, the club confirmed English goalkeeper and academy graduate Arthur Okonkwo was recalled from his loan at League Two side Crewe Alexandra and joined Austrian Bundesliga side Sturm Graz on loan for the remainder of the season. Arsenal announced their first signing of the winter transfer window on 20 January with 28-year-old Belgian forward Leandro Trossard joining the club on a long-term contract from fellow Premier League side Brighton & Hove Albion. He would wear the number 19 shirt. With the ability to play in several attacking positions, Trossard scored seven goals in sixteen Premier League games for Brighton this season. He also made three appearances for Belgium at the 2022 World Cup.

On 23 January, the club confirmed that they had signed 22-year-old Polish defender Jakub Kiwior from Serie A side Spezia. He would wear the number 15 shirt. A versatile defender, Kiwior was capable of playing both as a centre-back and as a defensive midfielder during his time with the Italian side. As of December 2022, he had won nine caps for Poland and started all four of their matches at the 2022 World Cup.

On transfer deadline day, 31 January, the Gunners announced that 31-year-old Italian midfielder Jorginho had joined the club from Premier League side Chelsea and would wear the number 20 shirt. Jorginho had made 143 Premier League appearances for Chelsea, winning the UEFA Europa League, UEFA Champions League, UEFA Super Cup and FIFA Club World Cup during his time at the club. Capped 46 times, he was part of the Italy squad which won UEFA Euro 2020. In 2021, he was named UEFA Men's Player of the Year and placed third in the Ballon d'Or.

The departures of two first-team players were announced on the same day, as Brazilian forward Marquinhos joined EFL Championship side Norwich City on loan for the remainder of the season, and Belgian midfielder Albert Sambi Lokonga joined fellow Premier League side Crystal Palace on loan until June 2023. On 1 February, Arsenal confirmed that Portuguese defender Cédric Soares had joined Premier League side Fulham on loan until the end of the 2022–23 season. After the winter transfer window closed, there were twenty-four players in the first-team squad: three goalkeepers, eight defenders, six midfielders, and seven forwards. Eleven first-team players were out on loan.

=== February ===
On 3 February, the club announced that Brazilian forward Martinelli had penned a new long-term contract. On 4 February Arteta's side faced 19th-placed Everton, a team that had appointed Sean Dyche as their new manager five days previously. James Tarkowski netted the only goal of the match in the 60th minute to clinch victory for the hosts, marking Arsenal's second Premier League defeat of the season and their first in the previous 14 games. Despite the loss, the Gunners remained top of the table by five points with a game in hand. On 11 February, Arsenal played at home against seventh-placed Brentford. Winter signing Trossard was brought on with the game still scoreless on the hour mark, and had scored his first goal for the club within five minutes. In the 74th minute however, Ivan Toney nodded in Christian Nørgaard's cross from close range for the visitors. The goal was eventually awarded by the video assistant referee Lee Mason after checking whether Brentford's had committed an offence. However, Mason failed to identify that Brentford's Nørgaard, who assisted the goal, was offside before making the crucial cross for Toney to score, and it later emerged that no lines had been drawn to check for a possible offside. Speaking at his post-match press conference, Arteta said that "different rules" were applied for Toney's Brentford equaliser. The following day, the Professional Game Match Officials Limited (PGMOL) acknowledged the errors in a statement. Lee Mason subsequently left PGMOL.

On 15 February, Arteta's side played the postponed Premier League match at home to second-placed reigning champions Manchester City. In the 24th minute, a Tomiyasu mistake allowed City's Kevin De Bruyne to score, before a Saka penalty brought Arsenal level in the 42nd minute. Two City goals in the second half from Jack Grealish and Erling Haaland sealed a 3-1 defeat, Arsenal's first home loss in 14 league games, and their eleventh consecutive league loss against Manchester City, their longest losing run against an opponent in their league history. After the match, Arsenal swapped places with City at the top of the table on goal difference with a game in hand. The Gunners travelled to Villa Park on 18 February to play against 11th-placed Aston Villa, managed by former Arsenal manager Unai Emery, who was facing his former club for the first time in the Premier League. In a six-goal thriller Arteta's side twice came from behind to win the match, while scoring twice in stoppage time. Strikes from Ollie Watkins and Philippe Coutinho were cancelled out by Saka and Zinchenko's first Premier League goal, before Jorginho's long-range shot and Martinelli's counter sealed a 4-2 victory, taking Arsenal two points clear of City with a game in hand.

On 21 February, Arsenal confirmed that Egyptian midfielder Elneny, who underwent surgery to his right knee in January, had extended his contract with the club until June 2024. The Gunners' last match of the month was against 14th-placed Leicester City at King Power Stadium on 25 February. Zinchenko started as Arsenal's captain for the first time as a mark of respect in the week of the first anniversary of Russia's invasion of his homeland Ukraine. Martinelli scored early in the second half—the 200th goal the Gunners had scored in the Premier League under Arteta—to take Arsenal's tenth away win of the campaign. Arteta dedicated the win to the people of Ukraine.

=== March ===
On 1 March, the Gunners played the postponed Premier League match at home to 18th-placed Everton. Saka scored from a narrow angle five minutes before half time with his 50th goal involvement in the Premier League, before Martinelli scored in first-half stoppage time. Ødegaard and Martinelli scored a third and fourth in the second half to take a 4-0 victory. This was Arsenal's 100th league victory against Everton, making the Gunners the first team in English league history to register 100 wins against a specific opponent. The result moved them five points clear at the top of the Premier League.

Three days later, Arteta's side played at home against 19th-placed Bournemouth. After Vieira replaced Xhaka in the starting lineup, this was the first time since January 1986 that Arsenal named a starting line-up without a single player to have made a competitive appearance under Wenger, who was in charge of the Gunners from 1996 to 2018. Bournemouth took the lead after just nine seconds through Philip Billing, in the second-quickest goal in Premier League history; They doubled their lead in the 57th minute through a Marcos Senesi header. Five minutes later, substitute Smith Rowe assisted Partey to reduce the deficit by one. Nelson came on as a substitute in the 69th minute, and assisted White's first Arsenal goal just a minute later. In the seventh minute of stoppage time, Nelson won the match with a long-range effort, sparking wild celebrations. This was the first time the Gunners had won a Premier League game in which they trailed by two or more goals since February 2012.

On 9 March, Arsenal drew 2-2 against Sporting CP in the Europa League last-16 first leg in Lisbon. They continued their Premier League campaign on 12 March, facing seventh-placed Fulham away at Craven Cottage. Gabriel Jesus was included in the Gunners' matchday squad for the first time since November 2022 following his knee injury, and came on in the second half. Goals from Gabriel Magalhães, Martinelli, and Ødegaard, all assisted by Trossard, secured a 3-0 win. The 3–0 win was Arteta's 100th victory in all competitions as Gunners boss, making him the ninth Arsenal manager to reach the milestone, and ensuring the Gunners became the first team in English Football League history to win five consecutive London derbies away from home without conceding a single goal. Arsenal's fine form during the season was recognised at the 2023 London Football Awards, which took place on 13 March. Ødegaard picked up the Premier League Player of the Year award, Saka won the Men's Young Player of the Year award, Ramsdale received the Goalkeeper of the Year award, and Arteta was named Manager of the Year.

The Gunners hosted Sporting CP in the second leg on 16 March. Xhaka put Arsenal ahead, before Pedro Gonçalves levelled with a 46-yard chip. Arsenal had several chances to score in extra-time, but despite Manuel Ugarte receiving a second yellow card, the Portuguese side held out to force the game to penalties, which they won 5-3. Ahead of the last international break of the season, the Gunners played at home on 19 March against 12th-placed Crystal Palace, who had sacked manager and former Arsenal captain Patrick Vieira two days previously. Martinelli scored his sixth goal in six Premier League games in the 28th minute with a left-footed strike, before Saka's brace and Xhaka's strike secured a 4-1 win. The victory extended the Gunners' winning streak to six in the league, and gave them an eight-point advantage over Manchester City with their opponents having a game in hand. With 10 league games to go, the Gunners had notched up 69 points to reach their same points tally as the previous season. The Gunners became the first side in English Football League history to win nine London derbies in a single league campaign.

On 21 March, Arsenal confirmed that defender Tomiyasu, who had suffered a significant injury in the match against Sporting five days ago, had undergone surgery to his right knee. Tomiyasu would miss the rest of the season.

Arteta picked up his fourth Premier League Manager of the Month award of the season, becoming the third manager in Premier League history to do so in a single campaign, after Guardiola in 2017–18 and Klopp in 2019–20. Saka won the Premier League Player of the Month award for the first time in his career. Ramsdale's vital save to deny Bournemouth's Dango Ouattara won the Premier League Save of the Month award, making him the first Arsenal goalkeeper to claim the award.

=== April ===
After the international break, Arsenal faced 14th-placed Leeds United at home on 1 April. Jesus opened the scoring with a penalty in the 12th minute, before White doubled the lead early in the second half. Gabriel Jesus netted his second eight minutes later, and although Rasmus Kristensen pulled one back, Xhaka restored the Gunners' three-goal lead on 84 minutes. The victory was Arteta's 100th in all competitions as Arsenal manager. The Gunners headed to Anfield to take on eighth-placed Liverpool on 9 April. Martinelli opened with his 25th Premier League goal, before assisting Jesus in the 28th minute. The hosts however pulled one back through Mohamed Salah on 42 minutes, who missed a penalty seven minutes into the second half, before Firmino scored a late equaliser in the 87th minute after sustained Liverpool pressure. In stoppage time, Ramsdale produced a flying fingertip save to deny Salah's deflected curling shot, then kept out Ibrahima Konaté's effort from point-blank range. The Gunners' seven-game winning run in the Premier League came to an end.

On 16 April, Arteta's side faced 14th-placed West Ham United at London Stadium. Gabriel Jesus scored his fourth goal in three matches in the seventh minute, before Ødegaard volleyed in a second three minutes later. However, Benrahma and Bowen pulled two goals back, with Saka also missing a penalty, to ensure that the Gunners had let a two-goal lead slip in consecutive league games. Five days later, the Gunners played at home against 20th-placed Southampton. The away team took a surprise lead through Theo Walcott after 28 seconds, and he doubled their lead fourteen minutes later. Martinelli pulled one back with his 15th league goal, before Duje Ćaleta-Car restored Southampton's two-goal cushion on 66 minutes. Two late goals from Ødegaard and Saka earned Arsenal a 3-3 draw, leaving the Gunners five points ahead of Manchester City, who had two games in hand.

The top two teams faced each other at the Etihad Stadium on 26 April. Saliba remained out with a back injury, and captain Ødegaard made his 100th appearance for the team in all competitions. Kevin De Bruyne opened the scoring for City seven minutes in, before John Stones doubled their lead in first-half stoppage time. De Bruyne scored his second nine minutes into the second half, and although Arsenal pulled one back through Holding in the 86th minute, Haaland netted in second-half stoppage time, sealing a 4–1 win for the hosts, and ending Arsenal's ten-game unbeaten run in the Premier League. This was Arsenal's twelfth consecutive Premier League loss against City, with an aggregate score of 5–33. After the match, their lead at the top of the league was cut to two points over Guardiola's side who had two games in hand and a superior goal difference. Despite the loss, Arteta's side mathematically qualified for next season's UEFA Champions League after a six-year absence.

Ramsdale's vital save to deny Liverpool's Salah won the Premier League Save of the Month award, making him the first Arsenal goalkeeper to receive the award back to back.

=== May ===
The club started May with a 3–1 win over 12th-placed Chelsea at home on 2 May. The Gunners dominated the first half, with Ødegaard netting twice and Gabriel Jesus once. This marked the second time the club had four players (Saka, Martinelli, Ødegaard and Gabriel Jesus) reach double figures for goals in a Premier League season, after 2012–13. The result secured the Gunners' fourth Premier League double over Chelsea and ensured it was the first time since February 2004 that Arsenal had won three consecutive Premier League games against the Blues. After the game, the club condemned the behaviour of a man who shone a laser in the face of Chelsea player Mykhailo Mudryk. The Metropolitan Police confirmed a 21-year-old man was arrested after the incident. The Gunners faced third-placed Newcastle United at St James' Park on 7 May. Arsenal secured a 2-0 victory, courtesy of an early Ødegaard strike and a Fabian Schär own goal. The Gunners had 81 points from 35 Premier League matches this campaign, a point behind leaders Manchester City who still had a game in hand.

Arsenal faced to seventh-placed Brighton & Hove Albion at home on 14 May. Second-half goals from Julio Enciso, Deniz Undav, and Pervis Estupiñán sealed a 3-0 win for the visitors. Four days later, the club announced that English goalkeeper Ramsdale had signed a new long-term contract.

In their final away game of the season, Arsenal faced 16th-placed Nottingham Forest at the City Ground on 20 May. Arsenal lost 1-0, courtesy of an early goal from Taiwo Awoniyi; the result sealed Forest's place in the top flight, and allowed Manchester City to clinch the Premier League title with three games still to play. In contrast to the first half of the season, when Arteta's side only dropped 7 points in 19 games (16 wins, 2 draws and 1 loss), they had collected just 9 points from their past 8 matches (2 wins, 3 draws and 3 losses). The Gunners were eight points clear of Guardiola's side earlier this season and had led the league for a long time, but ultimately their challenge collapsed. In fact, Arsenal topped the Premier League table for 248 days over the course of this campaign, the most without finishing first in English top-flight history.

The club confirmed on 23 May that English forward Saka had signed a new long-term contract. The Gunners' final game of the season was at home against 13th-placed Wolverhampton Wanderers. Two goals from Xhaka—his first brace for Arsenal in his 297th appearance—were followed by strikes from Saka, Jesus, and Kiwior's first Arsenal goal. The 5–0 win meant that Arteta's side finished the Premier League campaign in second place, five points behind champions Manchester City.

Arsenal's performances this campaign led to several season award nominations. Arteta was nominated for Premier League Manager of the Season; Ødegaard and Saka were shortlisted for Premier League Player of the Season; Martinelli, Ødegaard and Saka were included on the shortlist for the Premier League Young Player of the Season award; Ramsdale's vital stop to deny Bournemouth's Dango Ouattara on 4 March and his flying fingertip save to stop Liverpool's Salah from scoring a deflected curling shot on 9 April were nominated for the Premier League Save of the Season award; while Nelson won the Premier League Game Changer of the Season award, as his performance transformed the match against Bournemouth on 4 March. Arteta was also in contention for the League Managers Association (LMA) Manager of the Year award. Ødegaard and Saka were nominated for Professional Footballers' Association (PFA) Players' Player of the Year; Martinelli and Saka were included on the shortlist for the PFA Young Player of the Year award, which was won by Saka; Ødegaard, Ramsdale, Saka and Saliba were selected for the PFA Premier League Team of the Year; Ødegaard and Saka were also in contention for the PFA Premier League Fans' Player of the Year award. Saka and Ødegaard finished second and third respectively in the Football Writers' Association (FWA) Footballer of the Year award. Ødegaard and Saka were nominated for the 2023 Ballon d'Or, while Ramsdale was shortlisted for the 2023 Yashin Trophy. Ødegaard was voted as Arsenal's Player of the Season, and Nelson's last-gasp strike against Bournemouth was voted as the club's Goal of the Season.

=== June ===
Due to Premier League champions Manchester City winning the 2023 FA Cup final on 3 June, Arsenal, the league runners-up, would play against them in the 2023 FA Community Shield in August.

The Gunners' UEFA club coefficient was 76.000 points at the end of this campaign. They would be in Pot 2 for the 2023–24 Champions League group stage draw.

== First team ==
=== First-team coaching staff ===
| Position | Name | Nat. | Date of birth (age) | Appointed on | Last club/team | References |
|---|---|---|---|---|---|---|
| Manager | Mikel Arteta | ESP | 26 March 1982 (aged 41) | 20 December 2019 | (England) Manchester City (as assistant coach) | |
| Assistant Coaches | Albert Stuivenberg | NED | 5 August 1970 (aged 52) | 24 December 2019 | Wales (as assistant manager) | |
| Assistant Coaches | Steve Round | ENG | 9 November 1970 (aged 52) | 24 December 2019 | (England) Aston Villa (as Director of Football) | |
| Assistant Coaches | Carlos Cuesta | ESP | 29 July 1995 (aged 27) | 28 August 2020 | (Italy) Juventus | |
| Assistant Coaches | Miguel Molina | ESP | 3 January 1993 (aged 30) | 28 August 2020 | (Spain) Atlético Madrid | |
| Goalkeeping Coach | Iñaki Caña | ESP | 19 September 1975 (aged 47) | 24 December 2019 | (England) Brentford | |
| Set Piece Coach | Nicolas Jover | FRA | 28 October 1981 (aged 41) | 5 July 2021 | (England) Manchester City (as set-piece coach) | |

Notes:

- Age as of 30 June 2023.
- Carlos Cuesta is the first-team Individual Development Coach.

=== First-team squad ===
Notes:

- Squad numbers last updated on 31 January 2023. Age as of 30 June 2023.
- Appearances and goals last updated on 28 May 2023, including all competitions for senior teams.
- Flags indicate national team as defined under FIFA eligibility rules. Players may hold more than one non-FIFA nationality.
- Player^{*} – Player who joined the club permanently or on loan during the season.
- Player^{†} – Player who departed the club permanently or on loan during the season.
- Player (HG) – Player who fulfils the Premier League's "Home Grown Player" criteria.
- Player (CT) – Player who fulfils UEFA's "club-trained player" criteria.
- Player (AT) – Player who fulfils UEFA's "association-trained player" criteria.
- Player (U21) – Player who was registered by Arsenal as an Under-21 Player on the 2022–23 Premier League Squad List.
- Player (ListB) – Player who was registered by Arsenal on the 2022–23 UEFA Europa League Squad List B.
- Positions: AM – Attacking midfielder, CB – Centre back, CM – Central midfielder, DM – Defensive midfielder, GK – Goalkeeper, LB – Left back, LW – Left winger, LWB – Left wing-back, RB – Right back, RW – Right winger, RWB – Right wing-back, ST – Striker.

| No. | Player | Nat. | Position(s) (Footedness) | Date of birth (age) | Signed | | Transfer fee | Apps. | Goals | Ref. |
| No. | Player | Nat. | Position(s) (Footedness) | Date of birth (age) | In | From | Transfer fee | Apps. | Goals | Ref. |
Goalkeepers
| 1 | Aaron Ramsdale (HG, AT) | ENG | GK (R) | 14 May 1998 (aged 25) | 2021 | (England) Sheffield United | £24m | 78 | 0 | |
| 30 | Matt Turner^{*} | USA | GK (R) | 24 June 1994 (aged 29) | 2022 | (United States) New England Revolution | Undisclosed | 7 | 0 | |
| 31 | Karl Hein (HG, CT, U21, ListB) | EST | GK (R) | 13 April 2002 (aged 21) | 2019 | (England) Arsenal Academy | N/A | 1 | 0 | |
Defenders
| 3 | Kieran Tierney | SCO | LB / LWB (L) | 5 June 1997 (aged 26) | 2019 | (Scotland) Celtic | £25m | 123 | 5 | |
| 4 | Ben White (HG, AT) | ENG | RB / CB (R) | 8 October 1997 (aged 25) | 2021 | (England) Brighton & Hove Albion | £50m | 83 | 2 | |
| 6 | Gabriel Magalhães | BRA | CB (L) | 19 December 1997 (aged 25) | 2020 | (France) Lille | £23.14m | 118 | 11 | |
| 12 | William Saliba (HG, CT, U21) | FRA | CB (R) | 24 March 2001 (aged 22) | 2019 | (France) Saint-Étienne | £27m | 33 | 3 | |
| 15 | Jakub Kiwior^{*} | POL | CB / LB (L) | 15 February 2000 (aged 23) | 2023 | (Italy) Spezia | £17.6m | 8 | 1 | |
| 16 | Rob Holding (HG, AT) | ENG | CB (R) | 20 September 1995 (aged 27) | 2016 | (England) Bolton Wanderers | £2m | 162 | 5 | |
| 18 | Takehiro Tomiyasu | JPN | RB / LB (R) | 5 November 1998 (aged 24) | 2021 | (Italy) Bologna | £16m | 53 | 0 | |
| 35 | Oleksandr Zinchenko^{*} | UKR | LB / CM (L) | 15 December 1996 (aged 26) | 2022 | (England) Manchester City | £30m | 33 | 1 | |
Midfielders
| 5 | Thomas Partey | GHA | DM / CM / RB (R) | 13 June 1993 (aged 30) | 2020 | (Spain) Atlético Madrid | £45.3m | 99 | 5 | |
| 8 | Martin Ødegaard (captain) | NOR | AM / CM (L) | 17 December 1998 (aged 24) | 2021 | (Spain) Real Madrid | £30m | 105 | 24 | |
| 20 | Jorginho^{*} | ITA | DM / CM (R) | 20 December 1991 (aged 31) | 2023 | (England) Chelsea | £12m | 16 | 0 | |
| 21 | Fábio Vieira^{*} | POR | AM (L) | 30 May 2000 (aged 23) | 2022 | (Portugal) Porto | £29.9m | 33 | 2 | |
| 25 | Mohamed Elneny | EGY | DM (R) | 11 July 1992 (aged 30) | 2016 | (Switzerland) Basel | £5m | 155 | 6 | |
| 34 | Granit Xhaka (vice-captain) | SUI | CM (L) | 27 September 1992 (aged 30) | 2016 | (Germany) Borussia Mönchengladbach | £34.5m | 297 | 23 | |
Forwards
| 7 | Bukayo Saka (HG, CT, U21, ListB) | ENG | RW (L) | 5 September 2001 (aged 21) | 2018 | (England) Arsenal Academy | N/A | 179 | 38 | |
| 9 | Gabriel Jesus^{*} (vice-captain) | BRA | ST (R) | 3 April 1997 (aged 26) | 2022 | (England) Manchester City | £45m | 33 | 11 | |
| 10 | Emile Smith Rowe (HG, CT) | ENG | LW / AM (R) | 28 July 2000 (aged 22) | 2017 | (England) Arsenal Academy | N/A | 96 | 18 | |
| 11 | Gabriel Martinelli (HG, CT, U21) | BRA | LW / ST (R) | 18 June 2001 (aged 22) | 2019 | (Brazil) Ituano | £6m | 130 | 33 | |
| 14 | Eddie Nketiah (HG, CT) | ENG | ST (R) | 30 May 1999 (aged 24) | 2016 | (England) Arsenal Academy | N/A | 131 | 32 | |
| 19 | Leandro Trossard^{*} | BEL | LW / ST (R) | 4 December 1994 (aged 28) | 2023 | (England) Brighton & Hove Albion | £21m | 22 | 1 | |
| 24 | Reiss Nelson (HG, CT) | ENG | RW / LW (R) | 10 December 1999 (aged 23) | 2016 | (England) Arsenal Academy | N/A | 66 | 7 | |
Out on loan
| — | Ainsley Maitland-Niles^{†} (HG, CT) | ENG | CM / RB / RWB / LWB (R) | 29 August 1997 (aged 25) | 2014 | (England) Arsenal Academy | N/A | 132 | 3 | |
| — | Nicolas Pépé^{†} | CIV | RW (L) | 29 May 1995 (aged 28) | 2019 | (France) Lille | £72m | 112 | 27 | |
| — | Nuno Tavares^{†} | POR | LB / LWB (L) | 26 January 2000 (aged 23) | 2021 | (Portugal) Benfica | £8m | 28 | 1 | |
| — | Auston Trusty^{†} | USA | CB (L) | 12 August 1998 (aged 24) | 2022 | (United States) Colorado Rapids | Undisclosed | 0 | 0 | |
| 13 | Rúnar Alex Rúnarsson^{†} | ISL | GK (R) | 18 February 1995 (aged 28) | 2020 | (France) Dijon | Undisclosed | 6 | 0 | |
| 17 | Cédric Soares^{†} | POR | RB / RWB (R) | 31 August 1991 (aged 31) | 2020 | (England) Southampton | Free | 59 | 2 | |
| 22 | Pablo Marí^{†} | ESP | CB (L) | 31 August 1993 (aged 29) | 2020 | (Brazil) Flamengo | £6.8m | 22 | 1 | |
| 23 | Albert Sambi Lokonga^{†} | BEL | CM (R) | 22 October 1999 (aged 23) | 2021 | (Belgium) Anderlecht | £17.2m | 39 | 0 | |
| 26 | Folarin Balogun^{†} (HG, CT, U21) | USA | ST (R) | 3 July 2001 (aged 21) | 2019 | (England) Arsenal Academy | N/A | 10 | 2 | |
| 27 | Marquinhos^{*†} (U21) | BRA | RW (L) | 7 April 2003 (aged 20) | 2022 | (Brazil) São Paulo | £3.5m | 6 | 1 | |
| 33 | Arthur Okonkwo^{†} (HG, CT, U21) | ENG | GK (R) | 9 September 2001 (aged 21) | 2018 | (England) Arsenal Academy | N/A | 0 | 0 | |

==== Squad number changes ====
Note: Squad numbers last updated on 31 January 2023.

| No. | Current player | Previous player | Notes | Ref. |
|---|---|---|---|---|
| 1 | (England) Aaron Ramsdale (previously no. 32) | (Germany) Bernd Leno (2021–22) | Leno departed the club. | |
| 9 | (Brazil) Gabriel Jesus (new signing) | (France) Alexandre Lacazette (2021–22) | Lacazette departed the club. | |
| 11 | (Brazil) Gabriel Martinelli (previously no. 35) | (Uruguay) Lucas Torreira (2021–22) | Torreira departed the club. | |
| 12 | (France) William Saliba (returning loanee) | (Brazil) Willian (2020–21) | Willian departed the club. | |
| 14 | (England) Eddie Nketiah (previously no. 30) | (Gabon) Pierre-Emerick Aubameyang (2021–22) | Aubameyang departed the club. | |
| 15 | (Poland) Jakub Kiwior (new signing) | (England) Ainsley Maitland-Niles (2021–22) | Maitland-Niles was loaned out. | |
| 19 | (Belgium) Leandro Trossard (new signing) | (Ivory Coast) Nicolas Pépé (2021–22) | Pépé was loaned out. | |
| 20 | (Italy) Jorginho (new signing) | (Portugal) Nuno Tavares (2021–22) | Tavares was loaned out. | |
| 21 | (Portugal) Fábio Vieira (new signing) | (England) Calum Chambers (2021–22) | Chambers departed the club. | |
| 27 | (Brazil) Marquinhos (new signing) | (Greece) Konstantinos Mavropanos (2021–22) | Mavropanos departed the club. | |
| 30 | (United States) Matt Turner (new signing) | (England) Eddie Nketiah (2021–22) | Nketiah took the number 14 shirt. | |
| 31 | (Estonia) Karl Hein (previously no. 49) | (Bosnia and Herzegovina) Sead Kolašinac (2021–22) | Kolašinac departed the club. | |
| 35 | (Ukraine) Oleksandr Zinchenko (new signing) | (Brazil) Gabriel Martinelli (2021–22) | Martinelli took the number 11 shirt. | |

== Academy ==
=== Academy coaching staff ===
| Position | Name | Nationality | Year joined | Last club/team | References |
|---|---|---|---|---|---|
| Academy Manager | Per Mertesacker | Germany | 2018 | (England) Arsenal (as player) | |
| Head of Academy Coaching | Luke Hobbs | England | 2013 | (England) Southend United | |
| Under-21s Head Coach | Mehmet Ali | Turkey | 2022 | (England) Reading | |
| Under-18s Head Coach | Jack Wilshere | England | 2022 | (Denmark) AGF (as player) | |

=== Academy players ===
The following Arsenal Academy players made appearances for the club's first team during the season.

Notes:

- Players last updated on 28 May 2023. Age as of 30 June 2023.
- Flags indicate national team as defined under FIFA eligibility rules. Players may hold more than one non-FIFA nationality.

| Team | Squad number | Player | Nationality | Position | Date of birth (age) | References |
|---|---|---|---|---|---|---|
| U18s | 83 | Ethan Nwaneri | England | MF | 21 March 2007 (aged 16) | |

== Board and management team ==
Arsenal board
| Position | Name | Ref. |
|---|---|---|
| Co-Chairman | (United States) Stan Kroenke | |
| Co-Chairman | (United States) Josh Kroenke | |
| Executive Vice-Chair | (England) Tim Lewis | |
| Director | (England) Lord Harris of Peckham | |

Management team
| Position | Name | Ref. |
|---|---|---|
| Chief Executive Officer | (England) Vinai Venkatesham | |
| Sporting Director | (Brazil) Edu Gaspar | |
| Director of Football Operations | (England) Richard Garlick | |
| Head of Sports Medicine | (Republic of Ireland) Dr Gary O'Driscoll | |

Notes:

- On 15 March 2023, the club announced that Arsenal owner Stan Kroenke and his son Josh had been appointed as co-chairmen whilst Tim Lewis had become executive vice-chairman in a boardroom restructure.
- On 18 November 2022, the club appointed Edu Gaspar as their first-ever sporting director.

== Contracts and transfers ==
=== New contracts ===
The following Arsenal players signed their first or new professional contracts with the club.

| Date | No. | Pos. | Player | Contract type | Ref. |
First team
| 24 May 2022 | 25 | MF | (Egypt) Mohamed Elneny | Contract extension till 2023 | |
| 18 June 2022 | 14 | FW | (England) Eddie Nketiah | Contract extension till 2027 | |
| 21 October 2022 | 6 | DF | (Brazil) Gabriel Magalhães | Contract extension till 2027 | |
| 3 February 2023 | 11 | FW | (Brazil) Gabriel Martinelli | Contract extension till at least 2027 | |
| 21 February 2023 | 25 | MF | (Egypt) Mohamed Elneny | Contract extension till 2024 | |
| 18 May 2023 | 1 | GK | (England) Aaron Ramsdale | Contract extension till 2027 | |
| 23 May 2023 | 7 | FW | (England) Bukayo Saka | Contract extension till 2027 | |
Academy
| 24 May 2022 | 42 | MF | (Romania) Cătălin Cîrjan | First professional contract | |
| 9 June 2022 | 91 | MF | (England) Amario Cozier-Duberry | First professional contract | |
| 4 July 2022 | 41 | MF | (England) Mauro Bandeira | First professional contract | |
| 5 July 2022 | 50 | DF | (England) Taylor Foran | First professional contract | |
| 6 July 2022 | 71 | FW | (England) Charles Sagoe Jr | First professional contract | |
| 8 July 2022 | 75 | MF | (England) James Sweet | First professional contract | |
| 8 July 2022 | 77 | FW | (England) Billy Vigar | First professional contract | |
| 12 August 2022 | 64 | DF | (England) Brooke Norton-Cuffy | First professional contract | |
| 29 April 2023 | 110 | DF | (Poland) Michał Rosiak | First professional contract | |

=== Released ===
The following players from Arsenal's first team, under-21s and under-18s squads were released by the club.

| Date | No. | Pos. | Player | Subsequent club | Join date | Notes | Ref. |
First team
| 30 June 2022 | 9 | FW | (France) Alexandre Lacazette | (France) Lyon | 1 July 2022 | End of contract | |
Academy
| 24 May 2022 | 81 | MF | (Brazil) Luigi Gaspar | (England) Watford | 6 July 2022 | Contract termination | |
| 30 June 2022 | 46 | DF | (England) Jonathan Dinzeyi | Unattached in the 2022–23 season | | End of contract | |
| 30 June 2022 | 56 | DF | (Spain) Joel López | (Spain) Cultural Leonesa | 5 August 2022 | End of contract | |
| 30 June 2022 | 57 | MF | (Republic of Ireland) Jordan McEneff | (Republic of Ireland) Derry City | 19 August 2022 | End of contract | |

=== Transfers in ===
The following players joined Arsenal permanently and signed professional contracts with the club.

| Date | No. | Pos. | Player | Transferred from | Fee | Ref. |
First team
| 10 June 2022 | 27 | FW | (Brazil) Marquinhos | (Brazil) São Paulo | £3.5m | |
| 21 June 2022 | 21 | MF | (Portugal) Fábio Vieira | (Portugal) Porto | £29.9m | |
| 27 June 2022 | 30 | GK | (United States) Matt Turner | (United States) New England Revolution | Undisclosed | |
| 4 July 2022 | 9 | FW | (Brazil) Gabriel Jesus | (England) Manchester City | £45m | |
| 22 July 2022 | 35 | DF | (Ukraine) Oleksandr Zinchenko | (England) Manchester City | £30m | |
| 20 January 2023 | 19 | FW | (Belgium) Leandro Trossard | (England) Brighton & Hove Albion | £21m | |
| 23 January 2023 | 15 | DF | (Poland) Jakub Kiwior | (Italy) Spezia | £17.6m | |
| 31 January 2023 | 20 | MF | (Italy) Jorginho | (England) Chelsea | £12m | |

Total expenditure: ▼£159.0 million (excluding add-ons and undisclosed figures)

=== Transfers out ===
| Date | No. | Pos. | Player | Transferred to | Fee | Ref. |
First team
| 30 June 2022 | 27 | DF | (Greece) Konstantinos Mavropanos | (Germany) VfB Stuttgart | Undisclosed | |
| 30 June 2022 | 29 | MF | (France) Matteo Guendouzi | (France) Marseille | £9m | |
| 2 August 2022 | 1 | GK | (Germany) Bernd Leno | (England) Fulham | £8m | |
| 8 August 2022 | — | MF | (Uruguay) Lucas Torreira | (Turkey) Galatasaray | Undisclosed | |
| 1 September 2022 | 2 | DF | (Spain) Héctor Bellerín | (Spain) Barcelona | Free transfer | |
Academy
| 23 June 2022 | 64 | DF | (England) Jordi Osei-Tutu | (Germany) Bochum | Free transfer | |
| 30 June 2022 | 39 | DF | (Northern Ireland) Daniel Ballard | (England) Sunderland | Undisclosed | |
| 1 July 2022 | 84 | GK | (England) Remy Mitchell | (Wales) Swansea City | Free transfer | |
| 4 July 2022 | 74 | DF | (England) Zak Swanson | (England) Portsmouth | Undisclosed | |
| 16 July 2022 | 52 | MF | (England) Omari Hutchinson | (England) Chelsea | Undisclosed | |
| 1 September 2022 | 66 | MF | (England) James Olayinka | (England) Cheltenham Town | Undisclosed | |
| 19 January 2023 | 43 | DF | (England) Harry Clarke | (England) Ipswich Town | Undisclosed | |

Total income: ▲£17 million (excluding add-ons and undisclosed figures)

=== Loans out ===
- Date^{‡} – Loan was originally scheduled to last to until end of the season but was curtailed.

| Date | No. | Pos. | Player | Loaned to | On loan until | Ref. |
First team
| 15 July 2022 | — | DF | (United States) Auston Trusty | (England) Birmingham City | End of Season | |
| 29 July 2022 | 33 | GK | (England) Arthur Okonkwo | (England) Crewe Alexandra | 14 January 2023^{‡} | |
| 30 July 2022 | 20 | DF | (Portugal) Nuno Tavares | (France) Marseille | End of Season | |
| 3 August 2022 | 26 | FW | (United States) Folarin Balogun | (France) Reims | End of Season | |
| 11 August 2022 | 22 | DF | (Spain) Pablo Marí | (Italy) AC Monza | End of Season | |
| 15 August 2022 | 13 | GK | (Iceland) Rúnar Alex Rúnarsson | (Turkey) Alanyaspor | End of Season | |
| 25 August 2022 | 19 | FW | (Ivory Coast) Nicolas Pépé | (France) Nice | End of Season | |
| 1 September 2022 | 15 | MF | (England) Ainsley Maitland-Niles | (England) Southampton | End of Season | |
| 16 January 2023 | 33 | GK | (England) Arthur Okonkwo | (Austria) Sturm Graz | End of Season | |
| 31 January 2023 | 23 | MF | (Belgium) Albert Sambi Lokonga | (England) Crystal Palace | End of Season | |
| 31 January 2023 | 27 | FW | (Brazil) Marquinhos | (England) Norwich City | End of Season | |
| 1 February 2023 | 17 | DF | (Portugal) Cédric Soares | (England) Fulham | End of Season | |
Academy
| 20 June 2022 | 43 | DF | (England) Harry Clarke | (England) Stoke City | 19 January 2023^{‡} | |
| 20 June 2022 | 66 | DF | (Tunisia) Omar Rekik | (Netherlands) Sparta Rotterdam | 30 January 2023^{‡} | |
| 22 June 2022 | 53 | FW | (England) Tyreece John-Jules | (England) Ipswich Town | End of Season | |
| 23 June 2022 | 58 | FW | (Denmark) Mika Biereth | (Netherlands) RKC Waalwijk | End of Season | |
| 30 June 2022 | 62 | FW | (Sweden) Nikolaj Möller | (Netherlands) FC Den Bosch | End of Season | |
| 6 July 2022 | 48 | GK | (England) Ovie Ejeheri | (England) Chelmsford City | 2 January 2023 | |
| 7 July 2022 | 60 | DF | (England) Alex Kirk | (Scotland) Ayr United | End of Season | |
| 20 July 2022 | 78 | MF | (Mexico) Marcelo Flores | (Spain) Real Oviedo | End of Season | |
| 21 July 2022 | 37 | DF | (England) Ryan Alebiosu | (Scotland) Kilmarnock | End of Season | |
| 1 August 2022 | 65 | DF | (Republic of Ireland) Mazeed Ogungbo | (England) Crawley Town | End of Season | |
| 3 August 2022 | 69 | MF | (England) Charlie Patino | (England) Blackpool | End of Season | |
| 22 August 2022 | 64 | DF | (England) Brooke Norton-Cuffy | (England) Rotherham United | 6 January 2023^{‡} | |
| 22 August 2022 | 73 | GK | (England) Tom Smith | (England) Bromley | 30 January 2023^{‡} | |
| 23 August 2022 | 68 | MF | (Netherlands) Salah-Eddine Oulad M'Hand | (England) Hull City | 31 January 2023^{‡} | |
| 1 September 2022 | 36 | MF | (Nigeria) Tim Akinola | (England) Chesterfield | End of Season | |
| 1 September 2022 | 39 | MF | (England) Miguel Azeez | (Spain) Ibiza | 4 January 2023^{‡} | |
| 6 January 2023 | 64 | DF | (England) Brooke Norton-Cuffy | (England) Coventry City | End of Season | |
| 10 January 2023 | 39 | MF | (England) Miguel Azeez | (England) Wigan Athletic | End of Season | |
| 19 January 2023 | 48 | GK | (England) Ovie Ejeheri | (Finland) SJK Seinäjoki | End of Season | |
| 30 January 2023 | 73 | GK | (England) Tom Smith | (England) Colchester United | End of Season | |
| 31 January 2023 | 43 | FW | (England) Nathan Butler-Oyedeji | (England) Accrington Stanley | End of Season | |
| 31 January 2023 | 50 | DF | (England) Taylor Foran | (England) Hartlepool United | End of Season | |
| 31 January 2023 | 66 | DF | (Tunisia) Omar Rekik | (England) Wigan Athletic | End of Season | |
| 31 January 2023 | 76 | FW | (England) Kido Taylor-Hart | (England) Derby County | End of Season | |
| 31 January 2023 | 77 | FW | (England) Billy Vigar | (England) Derby County | End of Season | |
| 17 February 2023 | 108 | GK | (England) Brian Okonkwo | (England) Hitchin Town | 19 February 2023 | |

== Kits ==
Supplier: Adidas / Sponsor: Emirates / Sleeve sponsor: Visit Rwanda

| Home | Away | Away alt.^{1} | Away alt.^{2} | Third | "No More Red" |

| Goalkeeper^{1} | Goalkeeper^{2} | Goalkeeper^{3} |

=== Kit information ===
This is Adidas's fourth year supplying Arsenal kit, having taken over from Puma at the beginning of the 2019–20 season. On 30 September 2022, Arsenal announced the extension of the partnership with Adidas until 2030.

- Home: The club confirmed on 19 May 2022 that their new home kit for the 2022–23 season would debut in the final home game of the 2021–22 season. The home kit uses Arsenal's traditional colours of red and white. The shirt has a red body and white sleeves, and is complemented by white shorts and red socks. The new feature added to the home kit is a lightning bolt pattern appearing on the collar and socks.
- Away: On 18 July 2022, the Gunners released their new away kit. The all-black shirt combines a bronze cannon badge and metallic trims with an all-over AFC graphic, and is partnered with black shorts and socks. White shorts and grey socks were used in some away games when there was a colour clash with the home team's kit. It was reported that Arsenal sold £1 million of the new away kit on launch day, a new club's record for first-day kit sales.
- Third: The new third kit was revealed on 29 July 2022, one day before the 2022 Emirates Cup match. It is the first pink outfield shirt in Arsenal's history. The shirt features an all-over ermine print, and is combined with navy shorts and pink socks.
- No More Red: On 6 January 2023, Arsenal announced that they were going to extend their "No More Red" campaign for a second season; an initiative that aims to combat knife crime in the capital. The same commemorative kit from the previous season was used this season, with typical white features set upon a slightly off-white kit.
- Goalkeeper: The new goalkeeper kits are based on Adidas's goalkeeper template for the season.

=== Kit usage ===
| Kit | Combination | Usage |
|---|---|---|
| Home | Red body, white sleeves, white shorts, and red socks. | Used in all home games except the final game of the season.; Premier League: used away against Chelsea, Everton, Leicester City, Manchester City, Newcastle United, Tottenham Hotspur and Wolverhampton Wanderers.; FA Cup: used away against Manchester City.; Europa League: used away against Sporting CP. |
| Away | Black shirt, black shorts, and black socks. | Premier League: used away against Aston Villa, Brighton & Hove Albion, Fulham, Leeds United, Nottingham Forest, Southampton and West Ham United.; Europa League: used away against Bodø/Glimt and Zürich. |
| Away alt.^{1} | Black shirt, black shorts, and grey socks. | Premier League: used away against Brentford, Liverpool and Manchester United. |
| Away alt.^{2} | Black shirt, white shorts, and black socks. | Europa League: used away against PSV Eindhoven. |
| Third | Pink shirt, navy shorts, and pink socks. | Premier League: used away against Bournemouth and Crystal Palace. |
| No More Red | White shirt, white shorts, and white socks. | FA Cup: used away against Oxford United. |
| Goalkeeper^{1} | Yellow shirt, yellow shorts, and yellow socks. | Premier League: used at home against Bournemouth, Brentford, Brighton & Hove Albion, Chelsea, Crystal Palace, Everton, Fulham, Leicester City, Liverpool, Manchester City, Manchester United, Newcastle United, Nottingham Forest, Southampton, Tottenham Hotspur and West Ham United; used away against Chelsea, Crystal Palace, Everton, Liverpool, Manchester City, Manchester United, Newcastle United and Southampton.; FA Cup: used away against Manchester City.; EFL Cup: used at home against Brighton & Hove Albion.; Europa League: used at home against Sporting CP; used away against PSV Eindhoven and Sporting CP. |
| Goalkeeper^{2} | Cyan shirt, cyan shorts, and cyan socks. | Premier League: used at home against Leeds United; used away against Bournemouth, Brentford, Brighton & Hove Albion, Fulham, Leeds United, Tottenham Hotspur, West Ham United and Wolverhampton Wanderers.; FA Cup: used away against Oxford United.; Europa League: used at home against Bodø/Glimt; used away against Bodø/Glimt and Zürich. |
| Goalkeeper^{3} | Grey shirt, grey shorts, and grey socks. | Premier League: used at home against Aston Villa; used away against Aston Villa, Leicester City and Nottingham Forest.; Europa League: used at home against PSV Eindhoven and Zürich. |

== Pre-season and friendlies ==
On 19 April 2022, Arsenal announced that they would travel to the United States in July to compete in the FC Series as part of their preparations during pre-season with matches against Orlando City and Chelsea. On 10 May, a further US tour friendly was confirmed against Everton in The Charm City Match in July. On 18 May, La Liga side Sevilla revealed their participation in the 2022 Emirates Cup in late July. On 6 June, Arsenal announced that they would travel to Germany to face 1. FC Nürnberg as part of a pre-season training camp at the Adidas headquarters in July, before heading to the US.

In order to prepare for the resumption of the Premier League following the mid-season World Cup break, Arsenal announced that they were going to partake in a warm-weather training camp in Dubai, United Arab Emirates in early December. This involved participating in the Dubai Super Cup against Lyon and Milan on 8 and 13 December respectively. Arsenal then announced a final friendly against Serie A side Juventus to be played on 17 December.

=== Friendlies ===
Win Draw Loss

| 8 July 2022 Friendly | 1. FC Nürnberg | 3–5 | Arsenal | Nuremberg, Germany |
| 17:30 CEST; 16:30 BST | Geis 24'; Duah 29'; Schleimer 73' | Report | Gabriel Jesus 47', 75'; Elneny 54', (yellow card) 59'; Schindler 57' (o.g.); Handwerker 63' (o.g.); Marí (yellow card) 85' | Stadium: Max-Morlock-Stadion; Attendance: 21,616; Referee: Michael Bacher |

| 16 July 2022 The Charm City Match | Everton | 0–2 | Arsenal | Baltimore, United States |
| 19:00 EDT; 00:00 BST ^{+1} | Godfrey (yellow card) 44'; Gbamin (yellow card) 79' | Report | Gabriel Jesus 33'; Saka 36'; Marí (yellow card) 89' | Stadium: M&T Bank Stadium; Attendance: 39,245 |

| 17 December 2022 Friendly | Arsenal | 0–2 | Juventus | Holloway |
| 18:00 GMT | | Report | Xhaka 45+1' (o.g.); Iling-Junior 90+1' | Stadium: Emirates Stadium; Attendance: 25,000; Referee: David Coote |

=== Florida Cup ===
| 20 July 2022 | Orlando City | 1–3 | Arsenal | Orlando, United States |
| 20:30 EDT; 01:30 BST ^{+1} | Jansson (yellow card) 13'; Torres 29'; Smith (yellow card) 61'; Ruan (yellow card) 90+3' | Report | Holding (yellow card) 2'; Martinelli 5'; Maitland-Niles (yellow card) 19'; Nketiah 66'; Nelson 80' | Stadium: Exploria Stadium; Attendance: 19,738; Referee: Kevin Broadley (United States) |
Note: The match was originally scheduled to kick off at 19:30 EDT (00:30 BST ^{+1}) but was delayed by 60 minutes due to inclement weather.

| 23 July 2022 | Arsenal | 4–0 | Chelsea | Orlando, United States |
| 20:00 EDT; 01:00 BST ^{+1} | Gabriel Jesus 15'; Ødegaard 36', (yellow card) 78'; Nketiah (yellow card) 61'; Saka 66'; Sambi Lokonga 90+2', (yellow card) 90+2' | Report | Mount (yellow card) 50'; Ampadu (yellow card) 77'; Alonso (yellow card) 77'; Koulibaly (yellow card) 90' | Stadium: Camping World Stadium; Attendance: 63,811; Referee: Kevin Broadley (United States) |
Note: This result ensured that Arsenal won the 2022 Florida Cup.

=== Emirates Cup ===
| 30 July 2022 | Arsenal | 6–0 | Sevilla | Holloway |
| 12:30 BST | Saka 10' (pen.), 19'; Gabriel Jesus 13', 15', 77'; Nketiah 89' | Report | Salas (yellow card) 73' | Stadium: Emirates Stadium; Attendance: 60,000; Referee: Andrew Madley (England) |
Note: This result ensured that Arsenal won the 2022 Emirates Cup.

=== Dubai Super Cup ===
| 8 December 2022 | Arsenal | 3–0 (2–1 p) | Lyon | Dubai, United Arab Emirates |
| 19:30 GST; 15:30 GMT | Gabriel 19'; Nketiah 33'; Vieira 39' | Report | | Stadium: Al Maktoum Stadium; Attendance: 7,451; Referee: Adel Al Naqbi (United Arab Emirates) |
| | Penalties |
| | Marquinhos (penalty scored); Smith (penalty scored); Cîrjan (penalty missed); Cozier-Duberry (penalty missed); Walters (penalty missed) | | (penalty missed) Reine-Adélaïde; (penalty scored) Mendes; (penalty missed) Tetê; (penalty missed) Barcola; (penalty missed) Cherki |
Note: Arsenal gained 4 points from this fixture: 3 for the victory in 90 minutes and 1 for the penalty shoot-out victory.

| 13 December 2022 | Arsenal | 2–1 (4–3 p) | Milan | Dubai, United Arab Emirates |
| 18:00 GST; 14:00 GMT | Ødegaard 21'; Nelson 41'; Nketiah (yellow card) 71'; Elneny (yellow card) 77' | Report | Tomori 78' | Stadium: Al Maktoum Stadium; Attendance: 11,965; Referee: Sultan Mohamed Saleh (United Arab Emirates) |
| | Penalties |
| | Cédric (penalty scored); Gabriel (penalty scored); Marquinhos (penalty scored); Elneny (penalty scored); Smith (penalty missed) | | (penalty scored) Bennacer; (penalty missed) Brahim; (penalty scored) Tonali; (penalty scored) Lazetić; (penalty missed) Krunić |
Note: Arsenal gained 4 points from this fixture: 3 for the victory in 90 minutes and 1 for the penalty shoot-out victory. This ensured that Arsenal won the Dubai Super Cup.

== Competitions ==
=== Overall record ===
Arsenal's playing record this campaign was 32 wins, 8 draws and 9 losses for an overall win rate of 65.31%, the second highest in the club's history.

| Competition | First match | Last match | Starting round | Final position | Record | | | | | | | |
| Competition | First match | Last match | Starting round | Final position | Pld | W | D | L | GF | GA | GD | Win % |
|---|---|---|---|---|---|---|---|---|---|---|---|---|
| Premier League | 5 August 2022 | 28 May 2023 | Matchday 1 | 2nd | 38 | 26 | 6 | 6 | 88 | 43 | +45 | 68.42 |
| FA Cup | 9 January 2023 | 27 January 2023 | Third round | Fourth round | 2 | 1 | 0 | 1 | 3 | 1 | +2 | 50.00 |
| EFL Cup | 9 November 2022 | | Third round | Third round | 1 | 0 | 0 | 1 | 1 | 3 | −2 | 0.00 |
| UEFA Europa League | 8 September 2022 | 16 March 2023 | Group stage | Round of 16 | 8 | 5 | 2 | 1 | 11 | 6 | +5 | 62.50 |
| Total | | | | | 49 | 32 | 8 | 9 | 103 | 53 | +50 | 65.31 |

Source: Soccerway

=== Premier League ===
Arsenal won 26 league games this season, equalling their highest-ever tally in the Premier League, which were also achieved in 2001–02 and 2003–04. They ended the campaign on 84 points, the third-highest total in their history. This was the first time the Gunners finished in the top four since the 2015–16 season.

==== League table ====
| Pos | Team | Pld | W | D | L | GF | GA | GD | Pts | Qualification or relegation |
|---|---|---|---|---|---|---|---|---|---|---|
| 1 | Manchester City (C) | 38 | 28 | 5 | 5 | 94 | 33 | +61 | 89 | Qualification to Champions League group stage |
| 2 | Arsenal | 38 | 26 | 6 | 6 | 88 | 43 | +45 | 84 | Qualification to Champions League group stage |
| 3 | Manchester United | 38 | 23 | 6 | 9 | 58 | 43 | +15 | 75 | Qualification to Champions League group stage |
| 4 | Newcastle United | 38 | 19 | 14 | 5 | 68 | 33 | +35 | 71 | Qualification to Champions League group stage |
| 5 | Liverpool | 38 | 19 | 10 | 9 | 75 | 47 | +28 | 67 | Qualification to Europa League group stage (Note: Since the winners of the 2022–23 FA Cup, Manchester City, qualified for the Champions League, the spot given to the FA Cup winners (Europa League group stage) was passed to the sixth-placed team.) |

Source: Premier League
Rules for classification: 1) Points; 2) Goal difference; 3) Goals scored; 4) If the champions, relegated teams or qualified teams for UEFA competitions cannot be determined by rules 1 to 3, rules 4.1 to 4.3 are applied – 4.1) Points gained in head-to-head record between such teams; 4.2) Away goals scored in head-to-head record between such teams; 4.3) Play-offs
(C) Champions

==== Results summary ====
| Overall | | | | | | | | Home | | | | | | Away | | | | | |
| Pld | W | D | L | GF | GA | GD | Pts | W | D | L | GF | GA | GD | W | D | L | GF | GA | GD |
|---|---|---|---|---|---|---|---|---|---|---|---|---|---|---|---|---|---|---|---|
| 38 | 26 | 6 | 6 | 88 | 43 | +45 | 84 | 14 | 3 | 2 | 53 | 25 | +28 | 12 | 3 | 4 | 35 | 18 | +17 |

Source: Premier League

==== Results by round ====
| Round | 1 | 2 | 3 | 4 | 5 | 6 | 8 | 9 | 10 | 11 | 13 | 14 | 15 | 16 | 17 | 18 | 19 | 20 | 21 | 22 | 23 | 12^{2} | 24 | 25 | 7^{1} | 26 | 27 | 28 | 29 | 30 | 31 | 32 | 33 | 34 | 35 | 36 | 37 | 38 |
|---|---|---|---|---|---|---|---|---|---|---|---|---|---|---|---|---|---|---|---|---|---|---|---|---|---|---|---|---|---|---|---|---|---|---|---|---|---|---|
| Ground | A | H | A | H | H | A | A | H | H | A | A | H | A | A | H | A | H | A | H | A | H | H | A | A | H | H | A | H | H | A | A | H | A | H | A | H | A | H |
| Result | W | W | W | W | W | L | W | W | W | W | D | W | W | W | W | W | D | W | W | L | D | L | W | W | W | W | W | W | W | D | D | D | L | W | W | L | L | W |
| Position | 2 | 2 | 1 | 1 | 1 | 1 | 1 | 1 | 1 | 1 | 1 | 1 | 1 | 1 | 1 | 1 | 1 | 1 | 1 | 1 | 1 | 2 | 1 | 1 | 1 | 1 | 1 | 1 | 1 | 1 | 1 | 1 | 1 | 2 | 2 | 2 | 2 | 2 |
| Points | 3 | 6 | 9 | 12 | 15 | 15 | 18 | 21 | 24 | 27 | 28 | 31 | 34 | 37 | 40 | 43 | 44 | 47 | 50 | 50 | 51 | 51 | 54 | 57 | 60 | 63 | 66 | 69 | 72 | 73 | 74 | 75 | 75 | 78 | 81 | 81 | 81 | 84 |

Source: Premier League
A = Away; H = Home; W = Win; D = Draw; L = Loss; P = Postponed
Notes:
- Positions show the situation at the end of the corresponding Game Weeks (GW), not the position at the conclusion of matches or game days.
- ^{1} Matchday 7 (vs. Everton) was postponed, alongside all other matches in the Premier League, due to the passing of Queen Elizabeth II.
- ^{2} Matchday 12 (vs. Manchester City) was postponed to accommodate Arsenal's rearranged Europa League fixture against PSV Eindhoven.

==== Matches ====
The league fixtures were announced on 16 June 2022.

Win Draw Loss

| 5 August 2022 1 | Crystal Palace | 0–2 | Arsenal | Selhurst |
| 20:00 BST | Clyne (yellow card) 64' | Report | Martinelli 20'; Xhaka (yellow card) 44'; White (yellow card) 60'; Guéhi 85' (o.g.) | Stadium: Selhurst Park; Attendance: 25,286; Referee: Anthony Taylor |

| 13 August 2022 2 | Arsenal | 4–2 | Leicester City | Holloway |
| 15:00 BST | Gabriel Jesus 23', 35'; Xhaka 55'; Martinelli 75'; Tomiyasu (yellow card) 90' | Report | Fofana (yellow card) 16'; Saliba 53' (o.g.); Maddison 74' | Stadium: Emirates Stadium; Attendance: 60,033; Referee: Darren England |

| 20 August 2022 3 | Bournemouth | 0–3 | Arsenal | Bournemouth |
| 17:30 BST | Zemura (yellow card) 27'; Smith (yellow card) 60' | Report | Ødegaard 5', 11'; Gabriel Jesus (yellow card) 52'; Saliba 54' | Stadium: Vitality Stadium; Attendance: 10,423; Referee: Craig Pawson |

| 27 August 2022 4 | Arsenal | 2–1 | Fulham | Holloway |
| 17:30 BST | White (yellow card) 36'; Gabriel Jesus (yellow card) 45'; Ødegaard 64'; Gabriel 86' | Report | Palhinha (yellow card) 45'; Robinson (yellow card) 51'; Mitrović 56'; Decordova-Reid (yellow card) 70' | Stadium: Emirates Stadium; Attendance: 60,164; Referee: Jarred Gillett |

| 31 August 2022 5 | Arsenal | 2–1 | Aston Villa | Holloway |
| 19:30 BST | Gabriel Jesus 30'; Ødegaard (yellow card) 39'; Saliba (yellow card) 48'; Martinelli 77' | Report | Ramsey (yellow card) 13'; Konsa (yellow card) 54'; McGinn (yellow card) 68'; Douglas Luiz 74' | Stadium: Emirates Stadium; Attendance: 60,012; Referee: Robert Jones |

| 4 September 2022 6 | Manchester United | 3–1 | Arsenal | Trafford |
| 16:30 BST | Antony 35'; Rashford 66', 75'; McTominay (yellow card) 71'; Maguire (yellow card) 81'; Eriksen (yellow card) 90+4' | Report | Saliba (yellow card) 25'; Saka 60', (yellow card) 87'; Gabriel Jesus (yellow card) 77' | Stadium: Old Trafford; Attendance: 73,431; Referee: Paul Tierney |

| 18 September 2022 8 | Brentford | 0–3 | Arsenal | Brentford |
| 12:00 BST | | Report | Saliba 17'; Gabriel Jesus 28', (yellow card) 90'; Vieira 49'; Xhaka (yellow card) 58' | Stadium: Gtech Community Stadium; Attendance: 17,122; Referee: David Coote |
Note: Original kick-off time was moved from 14:00 BST following discussions between the Premier League, the Metropolitan Police and relevant clubs after the passing of Queen Elizabeth II.

| 1 October 2022 9 | Arsenal | 3–1 | Tottenham Hotspur | Holloway |
| 12:30 BST | Partey 20'; Gabriel Jesus 49'; Xhaka 67'; Saliba (yellow card) 78'; Martinelli (yellow card) 85' | Report | Kane 31' (pen.); Emerson (red card) 62'; Dier (yellow card) 90+3' | Stadium: Emirates Stadium; Attendance: 60,278; Referee: Anthony Taylor |

| 9 October 2022 10 | Arsenal | 3–2 | Liverpool | Holloway |
| 16:30 BST | Martinelli 1'; Ødegaard (yellow card) 45+4'; Saka 45+5', 76' (pen.) | Report | Díaz (yellow card) 6'; Núñez 34'; Firmino 53'; Gomez (yellow card) 71' | Stadium: Emirates Stadium; Attendance: 60,059; Referee: Michael Oliver |

| 16 October 2022 11 | Leeds United | 0–1 | Arsenal | Leeds |
| 14:00 BST | Bamford (penalty missed) 64' | Report | Saka 35'; Saliba (yellow card) 62'; Gabriel (yellow card) 90+5' | Stadium: Elland Road; Attendance: 36,700; Referee: Chris Kavanagh |

| 23 October 2022 13 | Southampton | 1–1 | Arsenal | Southampton |
| 14:00 BST | S. Armstrong 65'; Walcott (yellow card) 89'; Lyanco (yellow card) 90+3' | Report | Xhaka 11'; Saka (yellow card) 29' | Stadium: St Mary's Stadium; Attendance: 31,145; Referee: Robert Jones |

| 30 October 2022 14 | Arsenal | 5–0 | Nottingham Forest | Holloway |
| 14:00 GMT | Martinelli 5'; Nelson 49', 52'; Partey 57'; Ødegaard 78' | Report | Gibbs-White (yellow card) 44' | Stadium: Emirates Stadium; Attendance: 60,263; Referee: Simon Hooper |

| 6 November 2022 15 | Chelsea | 0–1 | Arsenal | Fulham |
| 12:00 GMT | Aubameyang (yellow card) 27'; Azpilicueta (yellow card) 51'; Chalobah (yellow card) 60'; Gallagher (yellow card) 85'; Sterling (yellow card) 89' | Report | Saka (yellow card) 42'; Gabriel 63'; White (yellow card) 80' | Stadium: Stamford Bridge; Attendance: 40,142; Referee: Michael Oliver |

| 12 November 2022 16 | Wolverhampton Wanderers | 0–2 | Arsenal | Wolverhampton |
| 19:45 GMT | Toti (yellow card) 37'; B. Traoré (yellow card) 45+1'; Bueno (yellow card) 90+2' | Report | Partey (yellow card) 52'; Ødegaard 54', 75'; Gabriel (yellow card) 60' | Stadium: Molineux Stadium; Attendance: 31,624; Referee: Stuart Attwell |

Mid-season break for 2022 FIFA World Cup

| 26 December 2022 17 | Arsenal | 3–1 | West Ham United | Holloway |
| 20:00 GMT | Saka 53'; Martinelli 58'; Nketiah 69' | Report | Bowen (yellow card) 8'; Benrahma 27' (pen.); Coufal (yellow card) 44' | Stadium: Emirates Stadium; Attendance: 60,125; Referee: Michael Oliver |

| 31 December 2022 18 | Brighton & Hove Albion | 2–4 | Arsenal | Brighton and Hove |
| 17:30 GMT | Gilmour (yellow card) 45'; March (yellow card) 57'; Mitoma 65'; Ferguson 77'; Sarmiento (yellow card) 81' | Report | Saka 2', (yellow card) 54'; Ødegaard 39'; Gabriel (yellow card) 45+1'; Partey (yellow card) 45+2'; Nketiah 47'; Martinelli 71' | Stadium: Falmer Stadium; Attendance: 31,647; Referee: Anthony Taylor |

| 3 January 2023 19 | Arsenal | 0–0 | Newcastle United | Holloway |
| 19:45 GMT | Nketiah (yellow card) 32'; Ødegaard (yellow card) 40'; Xhaka (yellow card) 42'; Zinchenko (yellow card) 90+6' | Report | Bruno Guimarães (yellow card) 27'; Wilson (yellow card) 28'; Joelinton (yellow card) 58'; Almirón (yellow card) 59'; Lascelles (yellow card) 90+7' | Stadium: Emirates Stadium; Attendance: 60,319; Referee: Andrew Madley |

| 15 January 2023 20 | Tottenham Hotspur | 0–2 | Arsenal | Tottenham |
| 16:30 GMT | Romero (yellow card) 35'; Sessegnon (yellow card) 45+1'; Sarr (yellow card) 53'; Lenglet (yellow card) 72' | Report | Lloris 14' (o.g.); Ødegaard 36'; Martinelli (yellow card) 70'; Gabriel (yellow card) 90+1' | Stadium: Tottenham Hotspur Stadium; Attendance: 61,870; Referee: Craig Pawson |

| 22 January 2023 21 | Arsenal | 3–2 | Manchester United | Holloway |
| 16:30 GMT | White (yellow card) 19'; Nketiah 24', 90'; Saka 53' | Report | Rashford 17'; Antony (yellow card) 47'; Martínez 59'; Shaw (yellow card) 83' | Stadium: Emirates Stadium; Attendance: 60,325; Referee: Anthony Taylor |

| 4 February 2023 22 | Everton | 1–0 | Arsenal | Liverpool |
| 12:30 GMT | Tarkowski 60'; Mykolenko (yellow card) 63'; Onana (yellow card) 69'; Pickford (yellow card) 86'; Maupay (yellow card) 90+6' | Report | Zinchenko (yellow card) 90+6' | Stadium: Goodison Park; Attendance: 39,314; Referee: David Coote |

| 11 February 2023 23 | Arsenal | 1–1 | Brentford | Holloway |
| 15:00 GMT | Trossard 66' | Report | Toney 74'; Nørgaard (yellow card) 90+6'; Schade (yellow card) 90+8' | Stadium: Emirates Stadium; Attendance: 60,254; Referee: Peter Bankes |

| 15 February 2023 12 | Arsenal | 1–3 | Manchester City | Holloway |
| 19:30 GMT | Saka 42' (pen.); Tomiyasu (yellow card) 48'; Nketiah (yellow card) 64' | Report | De Bruyne 24'; Walker (yellow card) 34'; Ederson (yellow card) 36'; Silva (yellow card) 45+2'; Grealish (yellow card) 62', (goal) 72'; Haaland 82' | Stadium: Emirates Stadium; Attendance: 60,276; Referee: Anthony Taylor |
Note: Originally scheduled for 19 October 2022, this match was postponed to accommodate Arsenal's rearranged Europa League fixture against PSV Eindhoven. The latter was postponed due to the severe limitations on police resources and organisational issues related to the ongoing events surrounding the national mourning for Queen Elizabeth II.

| 18 February 2023 24 | Aston Villa | 2–4 | Arsenal | Birmingham |
| 12:30 GMT | Watkins 5'; Coutinho 31'; Douglas Luiz (yellow card) 45+3'; Martínez (yellow card) 84' | Report | Saka 16', (yellow card) 45+3'; Zinchenko 61'; Martínez 90+3' (o.g.); Martinelli 90+8' | Stadium: Villa Park; Attendance: 42,066; Referee: Simon Hooper |

| 25 February 2023 25 | Leicester City | 0–1 | Arsenal | Leicester |
| 15:00 GMT | | Report | Martinelli (yellow card) 38', (goal) 46' | Stadium: King Power Stadium; Attendance: 32,227; Referee: Craig Pawson |

| 1 March 2023 7 | Arsenal | 4–0 | Everton | Holloway |
| 19:45 GMT | Saka 40'; Martinelli 45+1', 80'; Ødegaard 71' | Report | Tarkowski (yellow card) 51'; Godfrey (yellow card) 66' | Stadium: Emirates Stadium; Attendance: 60,213; Referee: Michael Oliver |
Note: Originally scheduled for 11 September 2022, this match, alongside all others in the Premier League, was postponed due to the passing of Queen Elizabeth II.

| 4 March 2023 26 | Arsenal | 3–2 | Bournemouth | Holloway |
| 15:00 GMT | Partey 62'; White 70'; Nelson 90+7' | Report | Billing 1'; Senesi 57'; Neto (yellow card) 64'; Mepham (yellow card) 86' | Stadium: Emirates Stadium; Attendance: 60,222; Referee: Chris Kavanagh |

| 12 March 2023 27 | Fulham | 0–3 | Arsenal | Fulham |
| 14:00 GMT | | Report | Gabriel 21'; Martinelli 26'; Ødegaard 45+2', (yellow card) 74' | Stadium: Craven Cottage; Attendance: 24,426; Referee: David Coote |

| 19 March 2023 28 | Arsenal | 4–1 | Crystal Palace | Holloway |
| 14:00 GMT | Martinelli 28'; Saka 43', 74'; Xhaka 55' | Report | Tomkins (yellow card) 59'; Schlupp 63' | Stadium: Emirates Stadium; Attendance: 60,247; Referee: Stuart Attwell |

| 1 April 2023 29 | Arsenal | 4–1 | Leeds United | Holloway |
| 15:00 BST | Gabriel Jesus 35' (pen.), 55'; White 47'; Xhaka 84' | Report | Koch (yellow card) 45'; Kristensen 76'; Bamford (yellow card) 90+1' | Stadium: Emirates Stadium; Attendance: 60,283; Referee: Darren England |

| 9 April 2023 30 | Liverpool | 2–2 | Arsenal | Liverpool |
| 16:30 BST | Van Dijk (yellow card) 31'; Alexander-Arnold (yellow card) 41'; Salah 42', (penalty missed) 54'; Robertson (yellow card) 45+5'; Fabinho (yellow card) 55'; Firmino 87' | Report | Martinelli 8'; White (yellow card) 23'; Gabriel Jesus 28'; Xhaka (yellow card) 41'; Ramsdale (yellow card) 53'; Saka (yellow card) 84' | Stadium: Anfield; Attendance: 53,267; Referee: Paul Tierney |

| 16 April 2023 31 | West Ham United | 2–2 | Arsenal | Stratford |
| 14:00 BST | Benrahma 33' (pen.); Bowen 54'; Cresswell (yellow card) 82' | Report | Gabriel Jesus 7', (yellow card) 45+4'; Ødegaard 10'; Partey (yellow card) 35'; Saka (penalty missed) 52' | Stadium: London Stadium; Attendance: 62,475; Referee: David Coote |

| 21 April 2023 32 | Arsenal | 3–3 | Southampton | Holloway |
| 20:00 BST | Martinelli 20'; Zinchenko (yellow card) 45+4'; Ødegaard 88'; Saka 90' | Report | Alcaraz 1', (yellow card) 27'; Walcott 14'; Perraud (yellow card) 32'; Walker-Peters (yellow card) 42'; Ćaleta-Car 66'; Armstrong (yellow card) 76'; Diallo (yellow card) 90+4' | Stadium: Emirates Stadium; Attendance: 60,175; Referee: Simon Hooper |

| 26 April 2023 33 | Manchester City | 4–1 | Arsenal | Manchester |
| 20:00 BST | De Bruyne 7', 54'; Stones 45+1'; Dias (yellow card) 45+5'; Grealish (yellow card) 75'; Rodri (yellow card) 88'; Haaland 90+5' | Report | Partey (yellow card) 76'; Holding 86' | Stadium: Etihad Stadium; Attendance: 53,482; Referee: Michael Oliver |

| 2 May 2023 34 | Arsenal | 3–1 | Chelsea | Holloway |
| 20:00 BST | Ødegaard 18', 31'; Gabriel Jesus 34' | Report | Madueke 65'; Kovačić (yellow card) 80'; Gallagher (yellow card) 90+5' | Stadium: Emirates Stadium; Attendance: 60,144; Referee: Robert Jones |
Note: Originally scheduled for 29 April 2023, this match was postponed due to consequences of the increased policing demands necessary for the coronation of King Charles III.

| 7 May 2023 35 | Newcastle United | 0–2 | Arsenal | Newcastle upon Tyne |
| 16:30 BST | Burn (yellow card) 73'; Schär (yellow card) 90+6' | Report | Ødegaard 14'; Schär 71' (o.g.); Nketiah (yellow card) 90+6' | Stadium: St James' Park; Attendance: 50,267; Referee: Chris Kavanagh |

| 14 May 2023 36 | Arsenal | 0–3 | Brighton & Hove Albion | Holloway |
| 16:30 BST | Partey (yellow card) 88' | Report | Estupiñán (yellow card) 34', (goal) 90+6'; Enciso 51'; Groß (yellow card) 55'; Undav 86' | Stadium: Emirates Stadium; Attendance: 60,139; Referee: Andrew Madley |

| 20 May 2023 37 | Nottingham Forest | 1–0 | Arsenal | West Bridgford |
| 17:30 BST | Awoniyi 19', (yellow card) 25'; Niakhaté (yellow card) 45+2'; Gibbs-White (yellow card) 78' | Report | Gabriel Jesus (yellow card) 54'; Gabriel (yellow card) 78' | Stadium: City Ground; Attendance: 29,514; Referee: Anthony Taylor |

| 28 May 2023 38 | Arsenal | 5–0 | Wolverhampton Wanderers | Holloway |
| 16:30 BST | Xhaka 11', 14'; Saka 27'; Gabriel Jesus 58'; Kiwior 78' | Report | | Stadium: Emirates Stadium; Attendance: 60,095; Referee: Andre Marriner |

=== FA Cup ===
As a Premier League side, Arsenal entered the FA Cup in the third round. They were drawn away to League One side Oxford United. In the fourth round, they were drawn away to fellow Premier League side Manchester City.

Win Draw Loss

| 9 January 2023 Third round | Oxford United | 0–3 | Arsenal | Oxford |
| 20:00 GMT | Brown (yellow card) 59' | Report | Elneny 63'; Nketiah 70', 76' | Stadium: Kassam Stadium; Attendance: 11,538; Referee: David Coote |

| 27 January 2023 Fourth round | Manchester City | 1–0 | Arsenal | Manchester |
| 20:00 GMT | Aké 64'; Gündoğan (yellow card) 90+3' | Report | Holding (yellow card) 42'; Zinchenko (yellow card) 90+2' | Stadium: Etihad Stadium; Attendance: 51,694; Referee: Paul Tierney |

=== EFL Cup ===
As the Gunners were competing in UEFA competition in the 2022–23 season, they entered the EFL Cup in the third round. They were drawn at home to fellow Premier League side Brighton & Hove Albion.

| 9 November 2022 Third round | Arsenal | 1–3 | Brighton & Hove Albion | Holloway |
| 19:45 GMT | Nketiah 20'; Elneny (yellow card) 25'; Hein (yellow card) 26' | Report | Caicedo (yellow card) 8'; Welbeck 27' (pen.); Sarmiento (yellow card) 43'; Mitoma 58'; Lamptey 71' | Stadium: Emirates Stadium; Attendance: 59,233; Referee: Jarred Gillett |

=== UEFA Europa League ===
==== Group stage ====
The draw for the group stage was held on 26 August 2022.

| Pos | Team | Pld | W | D | L | GF | GA | GD | Pts | Qualification | ARS | PSV | BOD | ZUR |
|---|---|---|---|---|---|---|---|---|---|---|---|---|---|---|
| 1 | (England) Arsenal | 6 | 5 | 0 | 1 | 8 | 3 | +5 | 15 | Advance to round of 16 | — | 1–0 | 3–0 | 1–0 |
| 2 | (Netherlands) PSV Eindhoven | 6 | 4 | 1 | 1 | 15 | 4 | +11 | 13 | Advance to knockout round play-offs | 2–0 | — | 1–1 | 5–0 |
| 3 | (Norway) Bodø/Glimt | 6 | 1 | 1 | 4 | 5 | 10 | −5 | 4 | Transfer to Europa Conference League | 0–1 | 1–2 | — | 2–1 |
| 4 | (Switzerland) Zürich | 6 | 1 | 0 | 5 | 5 | 16 | −11 | 3 | | 1–2 | 1–5 | 2–1 | — |

Source: UEFA
Rules for classification: Group stage tiebreakers

Win Draw Loss

| 8 September 2022 1 | Zürich (Swiss Football Association) | 1–2 | (The Football Association) Arsenal | St. Gallen, Switzerland |
| 18:45 CEST | Kryeziu (yellow card) 18', (goal) 44' (pen.) | Report | Marquinhos 16'; Nketiah 62' | Stadium: Kybunpark; Attendance: 17,070; Referee: Mohammed Al-Hakim (Sweden) |
Note: Due to a music concert and athletic event in the vicinity of Zürich's home ground, Letzigrund, the match was played at Kybunpark, St. Gallen.

| 6 October 2022 3 | Arsenal (The Football Association) | 3–0 | (Norwegian Football Federation) Bodø/Glimt | London, England |
| 20:00 BST | Nketiah 23'; Holding 27'; Xhaka (yellow card) 41'; Vieira 84' | Report | Wembangomo (yellow card) 33'; Sampsted (yellow card) 53' | Stadium: Emirates Stadium; Attendance: 59,724; Referee: Harm Osmers (Germany) |

| 13 October 2022 4 | Bodø/Glimt (Norwegian Football Federation) | 0–1 | (The Football Association) Arsenal | Bodø, Norway |
| 18:45 CEST | Vetlesen (yellow card) 66' | Report | Saka 24', (yellow card) 30'; Partey (yellow card) 89'; Turner (yellow card) 90+2' | Stadium: Aspmyra Stadion; Attendance: 7,922; Referee: Irfan Peljto (Bosnia and Herzegovina) |

| 20 October 2022 2 | Arsenal (The Football Association) | 1–0 | (Royal Dutch Football Association) PSV Eindhoven | London, England |
| 18:00 BST | Xhaka (yellow card) 45+1', (goal) 70'; Ødegaard (yellow card) 88'; Tierney (yellow card) 88' | Report | Gutiérrez (yellow card) 56' | Stadium: Emirates Stadium; Attendance: 52,200; Referee: Alejandro Hernández Hernández (Spain) |
Note: The match was originally scheduled for 15 September 2022, but was postponed due to the severe limitations on police resources and organisational issues related to the ongoing events surrounding the national mourning for Queen Elizabeth II.

| 27 October 2022 5 | PSV Eindhoven (Royal Dutch Football Association) | 2–0 | (The Football Association) Arsenal | Eindhoven, Netherlands |
| 18:45 CEST | Veerman 55'; De Jong 63'; Mwene (yellow card) 67'; Simons (yellow card) 80' | Report | Tierney (yellow card) 58'; Martinelli (yellow card) 67'; Gabriel Jesus (yellow card) 79'; Xhaka (yellow card) 80' | Stadium: Philips Stadion; Attendance: 35,000; Referee: Marco Di Bello (Italy) |

| 3 November 2022 6 | Arsenal (The Football Association) | 1–0 | (Swiss Football Association) Zürich | London, England |
| 20:00 GMT | Tierney 17'; Gabriel (yellow card) 90+6' | Report | Aliti (yellow card) 32'; Katić (yellow card) 49'; Condé (yellow card) 62' | Stadium: Emirates Stadium; Attendance: 48,500; Referee: Erik Lambrechts (Belgium) |

==== Knockout phase ====
===== Round of 16 =====
As a result of finishing top of the group, Arsenal advanced directly to the round of 16. The draw was held on 24 February 2023. As a seeded team, Arsenal played the second leg at home.

| 9 March 2023 First leg | Sporting CP (Portuguese Football Federation) | 2–2 | (The Football Association) Arsenal | Lisbon, Portugal |
| 17:45 WET | Coates (yellow card) 23'; Inácio 34'; Paulinho 55'; Morita (yellow card) 58' | Report | Saliba 22'; Zinchenko (yellow card) 23'; Martinelli (yellow card) 43'; Morita 62' (o.g.) | Stadium: Estádio José Alvalade; Attendance: 36,006; Referee: Tobias Stieler (Germany) |

| 16 March 2023 Second leg | Arsenal (The Football Association) | 1–1 (a.e.t.) (3–3 agg.) (3–5 p) | (Portuguese Football Federation) Sporting CP | London, England |
| 20:00 GMT | Xhaka 19', (yellow card) 45+2'; Vieira (yellow card) 24'; Holding (yellow card) 71' | Report | Ugarte (yellow card) 53' (yellow-red card) 118'; Gonçalves 62'; Diomande (yellow card) 118' | Stadium: Emirates Stadium; Attendance: 59,929; Referee: Antonio Mateu Lahoz (Spain) |
| | Penalties |
| | Ødegaard (penalty scored); Saka (penalty scored); Trossard (penalty scored); Martinelli (penalty missed) | | (penalty scored) St. Juste; (penalty scored) Esgaio; (penalty scored) Inácio; (penalty scored) Arthur; (penalty scored) Santos |

== Statistics ==
Keys
| No. | Squad number | Pos. | Position |
| Player^{*} | Player who joined the club permanently or on loan during the season | | |
| Player^{†} | Player who departed the club permanently or on loan during the season | | |

=== Appearances ===
Twenty-eight players made appearances for Arsenal's first team during the season; six of them (Gabriel Magalhães, Martinelli, Ødegaard, Saka, White and Xhaka) each played at least 45 of the total 49 matches.

This was the first time since 1990–91 that the Gunners had four players (Gabriel Magalhães, Ramsdale, Saka and White) feature in every top-flight game. Ramsdale became the first Arsenal player to be on the pitch for every minute of the league season since goalkeeper Wojciech Szczęsny in 2011–12.

The Gunners were the most settled side of the Premier League season, as Arteta made the fewest changes to his starting XI between matches (just 38 across the whole campaign).

Arsenal had the second-youngest average starting line-up in the 2022–23 Premier League, at 25 years and 52 days – 11 days older than Relegated Southampton, and 2 years and 201 days younger than champions Manchester City.

Includes all competitions. Players with no appearances not included in the list.

| No. | Pos. | Player | Premier League | FA Cup | EFL Cup | Europa League | Total |
|---|---|---|---|---|---|---|---|
| 1 | GK | (England) Aaron Ramsdale | 38 | 0 | 0 | 3 | 41 |
| 3 | DF | (Scotland) Kieran Tierney | 6+21 | 2 | 1 | 6 | 15+21 |
| 4 | DF | (England) Ben White | 36+2 | 0+1 | 0 | 3+4 | 39+7 |
| 5 | MF | (Ghana) Thomas Partey | 28+5 | 1 | 0 | 0+6 | 29+11 |
| 6 | DF | (Brazil) Gabriel Magalhães | 38 | 2 | 0+1 | 5+2 | 45+3 |
| 7 | FW | (England) Bukayo Saka | 37+1 | 2 | 0 | 3+5 | 42+6 |
| 8 | MF | (Norway) Martin Ødegaard | 37 | 0+1 | 0 | 2+5 | 39+6 |
| 9 | FW | (Brazil) Gabriel Jesus^{*} | 24+2 | 0 | 0+1 | 3+3 | 27+6 |
| 10 | MF | (England) Emile Smith Rowe | 0+12 | 0+1 | 0 | 0+1 | 0+14 |
| 11 | FW | (Brazil) Gabriel Martinelli | 34+2 | 1+1 | 0+1 | 5+2 | 40+6 |
| 12 | DF | (France) William Saliba | 27 | 0+1 | 1 | 4 | 32+1 |
| 14 | FW | (England) Eddie Nketiah | 9+21 | 2 | 1 | 6 | 18+21 |
| 15 | DF | (Poland) Jakub Kiwior^{*} | 5+2 | 0 | 0 | 1 | 6+2 |
| 16 | DF | (England) Rob Holding | 6+8 | 2 | 1 | 6+1 | 15+9 |
| 18 | DF | (Japan) Takehiro Tomiyasu | 6+15 | 2 | 0 | 5+3 | 13+18 |
| 19 | FW | (Belgium) Leandro Trossard^{*} | 10+10 | 1 | 0 | 0+1 | 11+11 |
| 20 | MF | (Italy) Jorginho^{*} | 9+5 | 0 | 0 | 2 | 11+5 |
| 21 | MF | (Portugal) Fábio Vieira^{*} | 3+19 | 2 | 1 | 8 | 14+19 |
| 24 | FW | (England) Reiss Nelson | 0+11 | 0 | 1 | 4+2 | 5+13 |
| 25 | MF | (Egypt) Mohamed Elneny | 1+4 | 1 | 1 | 1 | 4+4 |
| 30 | GK | (United States) Matt Turner^{*} | 0 | 2 | 0 | 5 | 7 |
| 31 | GK | (Estonia) Karl Hein | 0 | 0 | 1 | 0 | 1 |
| 34 | MF | (Switzerland) Granit Xhaka | 36+1 | 1+1 | 0+1 | 6+1 | 43+4 |
| 35 | DF | (Ukraine) Oleksandr Zinchenko^{*} | 26+1 | 0+2 | 0+1 | 2+1 | 28+5 |
| 83 | MF | (England) Ethan Nwaneri | 0+1 | 0 | 0 | 0 | 0+1 |
Players who departed the club on loan but featured this season
| 17 | DF | (Portugal) Cédric Soares^{†} | 0+2 | 0 | 1 | 0+1 | 1+3 |
| 23 | MF | (Belgium) Albert Sambi Lokonga^{†} | 2+4 | 1+1 | 1 | 6 | 10+5 |
| 27 | FW | (Brazil) Marquinhos^{*†} | 0+1 | 0+1 | 1 | 2+1 | 3+3 |

=== Goals ===
Arsenal scored 103 goals in all competitions this season, which was the first time they reached three figures since 2018–19. They scored club-record 88 goals in the Premier League – the most they got in any top-flight campaign since 1963–64.

Nineteen players scored for Arsenal's first team during the season, sixteen of them netted in the Premier League. This was the first time since 1970–71 that the Gunners had two players (Martinelli and Ødegaard) score at least 15 league goals.

Includes all competitions. The list is sorted by squad number when total goals are equal. Players with no goals not included in the list.

| Rk. | No. | Pos. | Player | Premier League | FA Cup | EFL Cup | Europa League | Total |
|---|---|---|---|---|---|---|---|---|
| 1 | 7 | FW | (England) Bukayo Saka | 14 | 0 | 0 | 1 | 15 |
| 1 | 8 | MF | (Norway) Martin Ødegaard | 15 | 0 | 0 | 0 | 15 |
| 1 | 11 | FW | (Brazil) Gabriel Martinelli | 15 | 0 | 0 | 0 | 15 |
| 4 | 9 | FW | (Brazil) Gabriel Jesus^{*} | 11 | 0 | 0 | 0 | 11 |
| 5 | 14 | FW | (England) Eddie Nketiah | 4 | 2 | 1 | 2 | 9 |
| 5 | 34 | MF | (Switzerland) Granit Xhaka | 7 | 0 | 0 | 2 | 9 |
| 7 | 5 | MF | (Ghana) Thomas Partey | 3 | 0 | 0 | 0 | 3 |
| 7 | 6 | DF | (Brazil) Gabriel Magalhães | 3 | 0 | 0 | 0 | 3 |
| 7 | 12 | DF | (France) William Saliba | 2 | 0 | 0 | 1 | 3 |
| 7 | 24 | FW | (England) Reiss Nelson | 3 | 0 | 0 | 0 | 3 |
| 11 | 4 | DF | (England) Ben White | 2 | 0 | 0 | 0 | 2 |
| 11 | 16 | DF | (England) Rob Holding | 1 | 0 | 0 | 1 | 2 |
| 11 | 21 | MF | (Portugal) Fábio Vieira^{*} | 1 | 0 | 0 | 1 | 2 |
| 14 | 3 | DF | (Scotland) Kieran Tierney | 0 | 0 | 0 | 1 | 1 |
| 14 | 15 | DF | (Poland) Jakub Kiwior^{*} | 1 | 0 | 0 | 0 | 1 |
| 14 | 19 | FW | (Belgium) Leandro Trossard^{*} | 1 | 0 | 0 | 0 | 1 |
| 14 | 25 | MF | (Egypt) Mohamed Elneny | 0 | 1 | 0 | 0 | 1 |
| 14 | 27 | FW | (Brazil) Marquinhos^{*†} | 0 | 0 | 0 | 1 | 1 |
| 14 | 35 | DF | (Ukraine) Oleksandr Zinchenko^{*} | 1 | 0 | 0 | 0 | 1 |
| Own goal(s) | | | | 4 | 0 | 0 | 1 | 5 |
| Total | | | | 88 | 3 | 1 | 11 | 103 |

=== Disciplinary record ===
Arteta's team went a whole season with no red cards, and no player reached the threshold for bookings in the Premier League.

Includes all competitions. The list is sorted by squad number when total cards are equal. Players with no cards not included in the list.

| Rk. | No. | Pos. | Player | Premier League | | | FA Cup | | | EFL Cup | | | Europa League | | | Total | | |
| Rk. | No. | Pos. | Player | Yellow card | Second yellow card | Red card | Yellow card | Second yellow card | Red card | Yellow card | Second yellow card | Red card | Yellow card | Second yellow card | Red card | Yellow card | Second yellow card | Red card |
|---|---|---|---|---|---|---|---|---|---|---|---|---|---|---|---|---|---|---|
| 1 | 34 | MF | (Switzerland) Granit Xhaka | 5 | 0 | 0 | 0 | 0 | 0 | 0 | 0 | 0 | 4 | 0 | 0 | 9 | 0 | 0 |
| 2 | 7 | FW | (England) Bukayo Saka | 6 | 0 | 0 | 0 | 0 | 0 | 0 | 0 | 0 | 1 | 0 | 0 | 7 | 0 | 0 |
| 2 | 9 | FW | (Brazil) Gabriel Jesus^{*} | 6 | 0 | 0 | 0 | 0 | 0 | 0 | 0 | 0 | 1 | 0 | 0 | 7 | 0 | 0 |
| 4 | 5 | MF | (Ghana) Thomas Partey | 5 | 0 | 0 | 0 | 0 | 0 | 0 | 0 | 0 | 1 | 0 | 0 | 6 | 0 | 0 |
| 4 | 6 | DF | (Brazil) Gabriel Magalhães | 5 | 0 | 0 | 0 | 0 | 0 | 0 | 0 | 0 | 1 | 0 | 0 | 6 | 0 | 0 |
| 6 | 4 | DF | (England) Ben White | 5 | 0 | 0 | 0 | 0 | 0 | 0 | 0 | 0 | 0 | 0 | 0 | 5 | 0 | 0 |
| 6 | 8 | MF | (Norway) Martin Ødegaard | 4 | 0 | 0 | 0 | 0 | 0 | 0 | 0 | 0 | 1 | 0 | 0 | 5 | 0 | 0 |
| 6 | 11 | FW | (Brazil) Gabriel Martinelli | 3 | 0 | 0 | 0 | 0 | 0 | 0 | 0 | 0 | 2 | 0 | 0 | 5 | 0 | 0 |
| 6 | 35 | DF | (Ukraine) Oleksandr Zinchenko^{*} | 3 | 0 | 0 | 1 | 0 | 0 | 0 | 0 | 0 | 1 | 0 | 0 | 5 | 0 | 0 |
| 10 | 12 | DF | (France) William Saliba | 4 | 0 | 0 | 0 | 0 | 0 | 0 | 0 | 0 | 0 | 0 | 0 | 4 | 0 | 0 |
| 11 | 14 | FW | (England) Eddie Nketiah | 3 | 0 | 0 | 0 | 0 | 0 | 0 | 0 | 0 | 0 | 0 | 0 | 3 | 0 | 0 |
| 12 | 3 | DF | (Scotland) Kieran Tierney | 0 | 0 | 0 | 0 | 0 | 0 | 0 | 0 | 0 | 2 | 0 | 0 | 2 | 0 | 0 |
| 12 | 16 | DF | (England) Rob Holding | 0 | 0 | 0 | 1 | 0 | 0 | 0 | 0 | 0 | 1 | 0 | 0 | 2 | 0 | 0 |
| 12 | 18 | DF | (Japan) Takehiro Tomiyasu | 2 | 0 | 0 | 0 | 0 | 0 | 0 | 0 | 0 | 0 | 0 | 0 | 2 | 0 | 0 |
| 15 | 1 | GK | (England) Aaron Ramsdale | 1 | 0 | 0 | 0 | 0 | 0 | 0 | 0 | 0 | 0 | 0 | 0 | 1 | 0 | 0 |
| 15 | 21 | MF | (Portugal) Fábio Vieira^{*} | 0 | 0 | 0 | 0 | 0 | 0 | 0 | 0 | 0 | 1 | 0 | 0 | 1 | 0 | 0 |
| 15 | 25 | MF | (Egypt) Mohamed Elneny | 0 | 0 | 0 | 0 | 0 | 0 | 1 | 0 | 0 | 0 | 0 | 0 | 1 | 0 | 0 |
| 15 | 30 | GK | (United States) Matt Turner^{*} | 0 | 0 | 0 | 0 | 0 | 0 | 0 | 0 | 0 | 1 | 0 | 0 | 1 | 0 | 0 |
| 15 | 31 | GK | (Estonia) Karl Hein | 0 | 0 | 0 | 0 | 0 | 0 | 1 | 0 | 0 | 0 | 0 | 0 | 1 | 0 | 0 |
| Total | | | | 52 | 0 | 0 | 2 | 0 | 0 | 2 | 0 | 0 | 17 | 0 | 0 | 73 | 0 | 0 |

=== Clean sheets ===
Ramsdale became the third different goalkeeper to keep ten away clean sheets in a Premier League season, after Chelsea's Petr Čech and Manchester City's Ederson.

Includes all competitions. The list is sorted by squad number when total clean sheets are equal. Goalkeepers with no appearances not included in the list.

| Rk. | No. | Goalkeeper | Premier League | FA Cup | EFL Cup | Europa League | Total | Season percentage |
|---|---|---|---|---|---|---|---|---|
| 1 | 1 | (England) Aaron Ramsdale | 14 | 0 | 0 | 1 | 15 | 37% (15/41) |
| 2 | 30 | (United States) Matt Turner^{*} | 0 | 1 | 0 | 3 | 4 | 57% (4/7) |
| 3 | 31 | (Estonia) Karl Hein | 0 | 0 | 0 | 0 | 0 | 0% (0/1) |
| Total | | | 14 | 1 | 0 | 4 | 19 | 39% (19/49) |

=== Captains ===
Includes all competitions. The list is sorted by squad number when total number of games where a player started as captain are equal. Players with no games started as captain not included in the list.

| Rk. | No. | Pos. | Player | Premier League | FA Cup | EFL Cup | Europa League | Total | Ref. |
|---|---|---|---|---|---|---|---|---|---|
| 1 | 8 | MF | (Norway) Martin Ødegaard | 36 | 0 | 0 | 2 | 38 | — |
| 2 | 34 | MF | (Switzerland) Granit Xhaka | 1 | 1 | 0 | 5 | 7 | |
| 3 | 16 | DF | (England) Rob Holding | 0 | 1 | 1 | 0 | 2 | |
| 4 | 9 | FW | (Brazil) Gabriel Jesus^{*} | 0 | 0 | 0 | 1 | 1 | |
| 4 | 35 | DF | (Ukraine) Oleksandr Zinchenko^{*} | 1 | 0 | 0 | 0 | 1 | |
| Total | | | | 38 | 2 | 1 | 8 | 49 | |

=== International call-ups ===
Eighteen Arsenal first-team players (excluding players who were loaned out) were named in their respective countries' senior squads for international fixtures during the season.

The list is sorted by national team and player, respectively. Players with no senior national team call-ups not included in the list.

| National team | Player | Pos. | Debut | Caps | Goals | Latest call-up | Notes |
|---|---|---|---|---|---|---|---|
| Belgium | Leandro Trossard^{*} | FW | 2020 | 26 | 5 | March 2023 | |
| Brazil | Gabriel Jesus^{*} | FW | 2016 | 59 | 19 | November 2022 | |
| Brazil | Gabriel Martinelli | FW | 2022 | 6 | 0 | November 2022 | |
| Egypt | Mohamed Elneny | MF | 2011 | 93 | 8 | November 2022 | |
| England | Aaron Ramsdale | GK | 2021 | 3 | 0 | June 2023 | |
| England | Bukayo Saka | FW | 2020 | 28 | 11 | June 2023 | |
| England | Ben White | DF | 2021 | 4 | 0 | November 2022 | |
| Estonia | Karl Hein | GK | 2020 | 22 | 0 | June 2023 | |
| France | William Saliba | DF | 2022 | 8 | 0 | November 2022 | |
| Ghana | Thomas Partey | MF | 2016 | 45 | 13 | June 2023 | |
| Italy | Jorginho^{*} | MF | 2016 | 48 | 5 | June 2023 | |
| Japan | Takehiro Tomiyasu | DF | 2018 | 32 | 1 | November 2022 | |
| Norway | Martin Ødegaard | MF | 2014 | 51 | 2 | June 2023 | Started as Norway's captain |
| Poland | Jakub Kiwior^{*} | DF | 2022 | 13 | 1 | June 2023 | |
| Scotland | Kieran Tierney | DF | 2016 | 39 | 1 | June 2023 | |
| Switzerland | Granit Xhaka | MF | 2011 | 115 | 13 | June 2023 | Started as Switzerland's captain |
| Ukraine | Oleksandr Zinchenko^{*} | MF | 2015 | 53 | 8 | March 2023 | Started as Ukraine's captain |
| United States | Matt Turner^{*} | GK | 2021 | 29 | 0 | June 2023 | Started as the United States' captain for 2023 CONCACAF Gold Cup |

Arsenal top assist providers (2022–23 season, all competitions)
| Rank | Player | Assists |
|---|---|---|
| 1 | (Norway) Martin Ødegaard | 12 |
| 2 | (England) Bukayo Saka | 11 |
| 3 | (Brazil) Gabriel Martinelli | 10 |
| 4 | (Belgium) Leandro Trossard | 10 |
| 5 | (Switzerland) Granit Xhaka | 7 |
| 6 | (Portugal) Fábio Vieira | 6 |
| 7 | (England) Ben White | 5 |
| 8 | (Brazil) Gabriel Jesus | 5 |
| 9 | (Ukraine) Oleksandr Zinchenko | 2 |
| 10 | (Scotland) Kieran Tierney | 2 |

== Awards and nominations ==
Keys
| M | Matches | W | Won | D | Drawn | L | Lost |
| Pts | Points | GF | Goals for | GA | Goals against | GD | Goal difference |
| Pos. | Position | Pld | Played | G | Goals | A | Assists |
| CS | Clean sheets (for defenders and goalkeepers) | | | S | Saves (for goalkeepers) | | |
| Final score | The score at full time; Arsenal's listed first. | | | (N) | The game was played at a neutral site. | | |
| (H) | Arsenal were the home team. | | | (A) | Arsenal were the away team. | | |
| Opponent | The opponent team without a flag is English. | | | | | | |
| Player^{*} | Player who joined Arsenal permanently or on loan during the season | | | | | | |
| Player^{†} | Player who departed Arsenal permanently or on loan during the season | | | | | | |

=== Monthly awards ===
==== Arsenal Player of the Month ====
The winner of the award was chosen via a poll on the club's official website.

| Month | Pos. | Player | Pld | G | A | CS | Votes | Ref. |
|---|---|---|---|---|---|---|---|---|
| August | FW | (Brazil) Gabriel Jesus^{*} | 5 | 3 | 3 | – | Unknown | |
| September | MF | (Switzerland) Granit Xhaka | 3 | 0 | 1 | – | 83% | |
| October | MF | (Switzerland) Granit Xhaka | 9 | 3 | 0 | – | 42% | |
| November | DF | (England) Ben White | 3 | 0 | 0 | 3 | 47% | |
| December | FW | (England) Bukayo Saka | 2 | 2 | 0 | – | 50% | |
| January | DF | (Ukraine) Oleksandr Zinchenko^{*} | 5 | 0 | 0 | 3 | 48% | |
| February | DF | (Ukraine) Oleksandr Zinchenko^{*} | 5 | 1 | 0 | 1 | 49% | |
| March | FW | (Belgium) Leandro Trossard^{*} | 5 | 0 | 5 | – | 39% | |
| April | MF | (Norway) Martin Ødegaard | 5 | 2 | 1 | – | 68% | |

==== Arsenal Goal of the Month ====
The winner of the award was chosen from goals scored by men's, women's and academy teams via a poll on the club's official website.

- Score – The score at the time of the goal. Arsenal's score listed first.
- Player^{◊} – Women's first-team player
- Player^{#} – Academy player

| Month | Pos. | Player | Score | Final score | Opponent | Competition | Date | Votes | Ref. |
|---|---|---|---|---|---|---|---|---|---|
| August | DF | (France) William Saliba | 3–0 (A) | 3–0 (A) | Bournemouth | Premier League | 20 August | 51% | |
| September | MF | (Portugal) Fábio Vieira^{*} | 3–0 (A) | 3–0 (A) | Brentford | Premier League | 18 September | 61% | |
| October | MF | (Ghana) Thomas Partey | 1–0 (H) | 3–1 (H) | Tottenham Hotspur | Premier League | 1 October | 51% | |
| November | FW | (Netherlands) Vivianne Miedema^{◊} | 1–1 (A) | 1–1 (A) | (Italy) Juventus Women | Women's Champions League | 24 November | 27% | |
| December | FW | (England) Eddie Nketiah | 3–1 (H) | 3–1 (H) | West Ham United | Premier League | 26 December | 34% | |
| January | FW | (England) Bukayo Saka | 2–1 (H) | 3–2 (H) | Manchester United | Premier League | 22 January | 53% | |
| February | DF | (Ukraine) Oleksandr Zinchenko^{*} | 2–2 (A) | 4–2 (A) | Aston Villa | Premier League | 18 February | 40% | |
| March | FW | (England) Reiss Nelson | 3–2 (H) | 3–2 (H) | Bournemouth | Premier League | 4 March | 52% | |
| April | FW | (Republic of Ireland) Katie McCabe^{◊} | 2–1 (H) | 2–1 (H) | Manchester City Women | Women's Super League | 2 April | 63% | |

==== Premier League Manager of the Month ====
The winner of the award was chosen by a combination of an online public vote and a panel of experts.

Arteta picked up four Premier League's Manager of the Month awards in the 2022–23 season, becoming the third manager in Premier League history to do so in a single campaign. As manager of Arsenal, he had six awards in total up until that point, the joint-9th highest awards a single manager had received since its inception in August 1993.

| Month | Manager | M | W | D | L | GF | GA | GD | Pts | Pos | Result | Ref. |
|---|---|---|---|---|---|---|---|---|---|---|---|---|
| August | (Spain) Mikel Arteta | 5 | 5 | 0 | 0 | 13 | 4 | +9 | 15 | 1st | Won | |
| October | (Spain) Mikel Arteta | 5 | 4 | 1 | 0 | 13 | 4 | +9 | 13 | 1st | Nominated | |
| November/December | (Spain) Mikel Arteta | 4 | 4 | 0 | 0 | 10 | 3 | +7 | 12 | 1st | Won | |
| January | (Spain) Mikel Arteta | 3 | 2 | 1 | 0 | 5 | 2 | +3 | 7 | 1st | Won | |
| March | (Spain) Mikel Arteta | 4 | 4 | 0 | 0 | 14 | 3 | +11 | 12 | 1st | Won | |

==== Premier League Player of the Month ====
The winner of the award was chosen by a combination of an online public vote, a panel of experts, and the captain of each Premier League club.

Ødegaard won the Premier League's Player of the Month award after league-high six goal involvements (three goals and three assists) across November and December 2022. Saka won the Premier League's Player of the Month award (for the first time in his career) in March 2023, after joint-league-high five goal involvements (three goals and two assists).

| Month | Pos. | Player | Pld | G | A | CS | S | Result | Ref. |
|---|---|---|---|---|---|---|---|---|---|
| August | FW | (Brazil) Gabriel Jesus^{*} | 5 | 3 | 3 | – | – | Nominated | |
| August | MF | (Norway) Martin Ødegaard | 5 | 3 | 0 | – | – | Nominated | |
| October | MF | (Switzerland) Granit Xhaka | 5 | 2 | 0 | – | – | Nominated | |
| November/December | MF | (Norway) Martin Ødegaard | 4 | 3 | 3 | – | – | Won | |
| November/December | FW | (England) Bukayo Saka | 4 | 2 | 1 | – | – | Nominated | |
| January | FW | (England) Bukayo Saka | 3 | 1 | 1 | – | – | Nominated | |
| March | FW | (England) Bukayo Saka | 4 | 3 | 2 | – | – | Won | |
| March | FW | (Belgium) Leandro Trossard^{*} | 4 | 0 | 5 | – | – | Nominated | |

==== Premier League Goal of the Month ====
The winner of the award was chosen by a combination of an online public vote and a panel of experts.

- Score – The score at the time of the goal. Arsenal's score listed first.

| Month | Pos. | Player | Score | Final score | Opponent | Date | Result | Ref. |
|---|---|---|---|---|---|---|---|---|
| August | FW | (Brazil) Gabriel Jesus^{*} | 1–0 (H) | 4–2 (H) | Leicester City | 13 August | Nominated | |
| August | DF | (France) William Saliba | 3–0 (A) | 3–0 (A) | Bournemouth | 20 August | Nominated | |
| October | MF | (Ghana) Thomas Partey | 1–0 (H) | 3–1 (H) | Tottenham Hotspur | 1 October | Nominated | |
| November/December | FW | (England) Eddie Nketiah | 3–1 (H) | 3–1 (H) | West Ham United | 26 December | Nominated | |
| January | FW | (England) Bukayo Saka | 2–1 (H) | 3–2 (H) | Manchester United | 22 January | Nominated | |
| March | FW | (England) Reiss Nelson | 3–2 (H) | 3–2 (H) | Bournemouth | 4 March | Nominated | |

==== Premier League Save of the Month ====
The winner of the award was chosen by a combination of an online public vote and a panel of experts.

Ramsdale's vital save to deny Bournemouth's Dango Ouattara won March's Premier League Save of the Month award. It prevented Arsenal from going 2–0 down after 21 minutes of a match they ultimately went on to win 3–2 with Reiss Nelson netting the last-gasp winner. His flying fingertip save to stop Liverpool's Salah from scoring a deflected curling shot in stoppage time won April's award. It secured the Gunners a 2–2 draw at Anfield.

- Score – The score at the time of the save. Arsenal's score listed first.

| Month | Goalkeeper | Score | Final score | Opponent | Shot taker | Date | Result | Ref. |
|---|---|---|---|---|---|---|---|---|
| January | (England) Aaron Ramsdale | 2–0 (A) | 2–0 (A) | Tottenham Hotspur | Ryan Sessegnon | 15 January | Nominated | |
| February | (England) Aaron Ramsdale | 2–2 (A) | 4–2 (A) | Aston Villa | Leon Bailey | 18 February | Nominated | |
| March | (England) Aaron Ramsdale | 0–1 (H) | 3–2 (H) | Bournemouth | Dango Ouattara | 4 March | Won | |
| April | (England) Aaron Ramsdale | 2–2 (A) | 2–2 (A) | Liverpool | Mohamed Salah | 9 April | Won | |

=== Yearly awards ===
==== Arsenal F.C. ====
| Award | Player | Votes | Notes | Ref. |
|---|---|---|---|---|
| 2022–23 Player of the Season | (Norway) Martin Ødegaard | 55% | | |
| 2022–23 Goal of the Season | (England) Reiss Nelson | Unknown | vs Bournemouth on 4 March | |

==== Premier League ====
| Award | Manager or Player | Result | Notes | Ref. |
|---|---|---|---|---|
| 2022–23 Manager of the Season | (Spain) Mikel Arteta | Nominated | | |
| 2022–23 Player of the Season | (Norway) Martin Ødegaard | Nominated | | |
| 2022–23 Player of the Season | (England) Bukayo Saka | Nominated | | |
| 2022–23 Young Player of the Season | (Brazil) Gabriel Martinelli | Nominated | | |
| 2022–23 Young Player of the Season | (Norway) Martin Ødegaard | Nominated | | |
| 2022–23 Young Player of the Season | (England) Bukayo Saka | Nominated | | |
| 2022–23 Save of the Season | (England) Aaron Ramsdale | Nominated | vs Bournemouth on 4 March | |
| 2022–23 Save of the Season | (England) Aaron Ramsdale | Nominated | vs Liverpool on 9 April | |
| 2022–23 Game Changer of the Season | (England) Reiss Nelson | Won | vs Bournemouth on 4 March | |

==== League Managers Association ====
| Award | Manager | Result | Ref. |
|---|---|---|---|
| 2023 Manager of the Year | (Spain) Mikel Arteta | Nominated | |

==== Professional Footballers' Association ====
| Award | Player | Result | Ref. |
|---|---|---|---|
| 2022–23 Players' Player of the Year | (Norway) Martin Ødegaard | Nominated | |
| 2022–23 Players' Player of the Year | (England) Bukayo Saka | Nominated | |
| 2022–23 Young Player of the Year | (Brazil) Gabriel Martinelli | Nominated | |
| 2022–23 Young Player of the Year | (England) Bukayo Saka | Won | |
| 2022–23 Premier League Fans' Player of the Year | (Norway) Martin Ødegaard | Nominated | |
| 2022–23 Premier League Fans' Player of the Year | (England) Bukayo Saka | Nominated | |
| 2022–23 Premier League Team of the Year | (Norway) Martin Ødegaard | Selected | |
| 2022–23 Premier League Team of the Year | (England) Aaron Ramsdale | Selected | |
| 2022–23 Premier League Team of the Year | (England) Bukayo Saka | Selected | |
| 2022–23 Premier League Team of the Year | (France) William Saliba | Selected | |

==== Football Writers' Association ====
| Award | Player | Result | Ref. |
|---|---|---|---|
| 2023 Footballer of the Year | (England) Bukayo Saka | 2nd | |
| 2023 Footballer of the Year | (Norway) Martin Ødegaard | 3rd | |

==== London Football Awards ====
| Award | Manager or Player | Result | Ref. |
|---|---|---|---|
| 2022–23 Premier League Player of the Year | (Norway) Martin Ødegaard | Won | |
| 2022–23 Premier League Player of the Year | (England) Bukayo Saka | Nominated | |
| 2022–23 Men's Young Player of the Year | (Brazil) Gabriel Martinelli | Nominated | |
| 2022–23 Men's Young Player of the Year | (England) Bukayo Saka | Won | |
| 2022–23 Men's Young Player of the Year | (France) William Saliba | Nominated | |
| 2022–23 Goalkeeper of the Year | (England) Aaron Ramsdale | Won | |
| 2022–23 Manager of the Year | (Spain) Mikel Arteta | Won | |

==== Globe Soccer Awards ====
| Award | Manager | Result | Ref. |
|---|---|---|---|
| 2023 Best Coach | (Spain) Mikel Arteta | Nominated | |

==== Ballon d'Or ====
| Award | Player | Result | Ref. |
|---|---|---|---|
| 2023 Ballon d'Or | (England) Bukayo Saka | 24th | |
| 2023 Ballon d'Or | (Norway) Martin Ødegaard | 28th | |
| 2023 Yashin Trophy | (England) Aaron Ramsdale | 8th | |

== Milestones ==
Keys
| Final score | The score at full time; Arsenal's listed first. | (N) | The game was played at a neutral site. |
| (H) | Arsenal were the home team. | (A) | Arsenal were the away team. |
| Opponent | The opponent team without a flag is English. | | |
| Player^{*} | Player who joined Arsenal permanently or on loan during the season | | |
| Player^{†} | Player who departed Arsenal permanently or on loan during the season | | |

=== Debuts or 100th appearances ===
As a schoolboy midfielder at the age of 15 years and 181 days, Nwaneri became the youngest player in Premier League history when he came on as a substitute against Brentford in September. He also became Arsenal's youngest-ever player in any senior competition.

The following players made their 1st or 100th competitive appearances for Arsenal's first team during the campaign. When two Arsenal players make their first-team debuts at the same time, the Heritage number goes in order of who joined the club earlier.

| Date | Heritage number | Squad number | Pos. | Player | Age | Final score | Opponent | Competition | Ref. |
Debuts
| 5 August | 887 | 12 | DF | (France) William Saliba | 21 | 2–0 (A) | Crystal Palace | Premier League | |
| 5 August | 888 | 9 | FW | (Brazil) Gabriel Jesus^{*} | 25 | 2–0 (A) | Crystal Palace | Premier League | |
| 5 August | 889 | 35 | DF | (Ukraine) Oleksandr Zinchenko^{*} | 25 | 2–0 (A) | Crystal Palace | Premier League | |
| 4 September | 890 | 21 | MF | (Portugal) Fábio Vieira^{*} | 22 | 1–3 (A) | Manchester United | Premier League | |
| 8 September | 891 | 27 | FW | (Brazil) Marquinhos^{*†} | 19 | 2–1 (A) | (Switzerland) Zürich | Europa League | |
| 8 September | 892 | 30 | GK | (United States) Matt Turner^{*} | 28 | 2–1 (A) | (Switzerland) Zürich | Europa League | |
| 18 September | 893 | 83 | MF | (England) Ethan Nwaneri | 15 | 3–0 (A) | Brentford | Premier League | |
| 9 November | 894 | 31 | GK | (Estonia) Karl Hein | 20 | 1–3 (H) | Brighton & Hove Albion | EFL Cup | |
| 22 January | 895 | 19 | FW | (Belgium) Leandro Trossard^{*} | 28 | 3–2 (H) | Manchester United | Premier League | |
| 4 February | 896 | 20 | MF | (Italy) Jorginho^{*} | 31 | 0–1 (A) | Everton | Premier League | |
| 9 March | 897 | 15 | DF | (Poland) Jakub Kiwior^{*} | 23 | 2–2 (A) | (Portugal) Sporting CP | Europa League | |
100th appearances
| 18 September | 848 | 14 | FW | (England) Eddie Nketiah | 23 | 3–0 (A) | Brentford | Premier League | |
| 20 October | 869 | 3 | DF | (Scotland) Kieran Tierney | 25 | 1–0 (H) | (Netherlands) PSV Eindhoven | Europa League | |
| 27 October | 867 | 11 | FW | (Brazil) Gabriel Martinelli | 21 | 0–2 (A) | (Netherlands) PSV Eindhoven | Europa League | |
| 15 February | 872 | 6 | DF | (Brazil) Gabriel Magalhães | 25 | 1–3 (H) | Manchester City | Premier League | |
| 26 April | 879 | 8 | MF | (Norway) Martin Ødegaard | 24 | 1–4 (A) | Manchester City | Premier League | |

=== First goals ===
The following players scored their first goals for Arsenal's first team during the campaign.

| Date | No. | Pos. | Player | Age | Final score | Opponent | Competition | Ref. |
|---|---|---|---|---|---|---|---|---|
| 13 August | 9 | FW | (Brazil) Gabriel Jesus^{*} | 25 | 4–2 (H) | Leicester City | Premier League | |
| 20 August | 12 | DF | (France) William Saliba | 21 | 3–0 (A) | Bournemouth | Premier League | |
| 8 September | 27 | FW | (Brazil) Marquinhos^{*†} | 19 | 2–1 (A) | (Switzerland) Zürich | Europa League | |
| 18 September | 21 | MF | (Portugal) Fábio Vieira^{*} | 22 | 3–0 (A) | Brentford | Premier League | |
| 11 February | 19 | FW | (Belgium) Leandro Trossard^{*} | 28 | 1–1 (H) | Brentford | Premier League | |
| 18 February | 35 | DF | (Ukraine) Oleksandr Zinchenko^{*} | 26 | 4–2 (A) | Aston Villa | Premier League | |
| 4 March | 4 | DF | (England) Ben White | 25 | 3–2 (H) | Bournemouth | Premier League | |
| 28 May | 15 | DF | (Poland) Jakub Kiwior^{*} | 23 | 5–0 (H) | Wolverhampton Wanderers | Premier League | |

=== First assists ===
The following players registered their first assists for Arsenal's first team during the campaign.

| Date | No. | Pos. | Player | Age | Final score | Opponent | Competition | Ref. |
|---|---|---|---|---|---|---|---|---|
| 5 August | 35 | DF | (Ukraine) Oleksandr Zinchenko^{*} | 25 | 2–0 (A) | Crystal Palace | Premier League | |
| 13 August | 9 | FW | (Brazil) Gabriel Jesus^{*} | 25 | 4–2 (H) | Leicester City | Premier League | |
| 27 August | 12 | DF | (France) William Saliba | 21 | 2–1 (H) | Fulham | Premier League | |
| 8 September | 27 | FW | (Brazil) Marquinhos^{*†} | 19 | 2–1 (A) | (Switzerland) Zürich | Europa League | |
| 1 October | 4 | DF | (England) Ben White | 24 | 3–1 (H) | Tottenham Hotspur | Premier League | |
| 6 October | 21 | MF | (Portugal) Fábio Vieira^{*} | 22 | 3–0 (H) | (Norway) Bodø/Glimt | Europa League | |
| 25 February | 19 | FW | (Belgium) Leandro Trossard^{*} | 28 | 1–0 (A) | Leicester City | Premier League | |
| 7 May | 20 | MF | (Italy) Jorginho^{*} | 31 | 2–0 (A) | Newcastle United | Premier League | |

=== First clean sheet ===
The following goalkeeper kept his first clean sheet for Arsenal's first team during the campaign.

| Date | No. | Goalkeeper | Age | Final score | Opponent | Competition | Ref. |
|---|---|---|---|---|---|---|---|
| 6 October | 30 | (United States) Matt Turner^{*} | 28 | 3–0 (H) | (Norway) Bodø/Glimt | Europa League | |

=== First starts as captain ===
The following players made their first starts as captain of Arsenal's first team during the campaign.

| Date | No. | Pos. | Player | Age | Final score | Opponent | Competition | Ref. |
|---|---|---|---|---|---|---|---|---|
| 3 November | 9 | FW | (Brazil) Gabriel Jesus^{*} | 25 | 1–0 (H) | (Switzerland) Zürich | Europa League | |
| 25 February | 35 | DF | (Ukraine) Oleksandr Zinchenko^{*} | 26 | 1–0 (A) | Leicester City | Premier League | |

== Injuries ==
The following first-team players were unavailable for at least 30 days after suffering an injury during the campaign.

- National team^{‡} – International fixture

| No. | Pos. | Player | Last game before suffering an injury | First game after recovering from an injury | Arsenal games missed | Notes | Ref. |
|---|---|---|---|---|---|---|---|
| 24 | FW | (England) Reiss Nelson | Crystal Palace (5 August 2022) | Tottenham Hotspur (1 October 2022) | 7 | Nelson suffered a muscular injury in training after the match against Crystal Palace. | |
| 25 | MF | (Egypt) Mohamed Elneny | Fulham (27 August 2022) | (Switzerland) Zürich (3 November 2022) | 13 | Elneny suffered a hamstring injury in the match against Fulham. | |
| 10 | MF | (England) Emile Smith Rowe | Manchester United (4 September 2022) | Oxford United (9 January 2023) | 18 | Smith Rowe underwent surgery to repair a damaged tendon in his groin in September. | |
| 35 | DF | (Ukraine) Oleksandr Zinchenko | Tottenham Hotspur (1 October 2022) | Chelsea (6 November 2022) | 9 | Zinchenko suffered a calf injury in October. | |
| 9 | FW | (Brazil) Gabriel Jesus | Cameroon^{‡} (2 December 2022) | Fulham (12 March 2023) | 15 | Jesus underwent surgery to his right knee after suffering an injury during Brazil's World Cup match against Cameroon. | |
| 24 | FW | (England) Reiss Nelson | (Italy) Juventus (17 December 2022) | Manchester City (15 February 2023) | 9 | Nelson suffered a hamstring injury in the friendly against Juventus. | |
| 25 | MF | (Egypt) Mohamed Elneny | Oxford United (9 January 2023) | Would not return this season | 24 | Elneny underwent surgery to his right knee after suffering an injury in training in January. | |
| 14 | FW | (England) Eddie Nketiah | Everton (1 March 2023) | West Ham United (16 April 2023) | 7 | Nketiah suffered an ankle injury in the match against Everton. | |
| 18 | DF | (Japan) Takehiro Tomiyasu | (Portugal) Sporting CP (16 March 2023) | Would not return this season | 11 | Tomiyasu underwent surgery to his right knee after suffering an injury in the match against Sporting. | |
| 12 | DF | (France) William Saliba | (Portugal) Sporting CP (16 March 2023) | Would not return this season | 11 | Saliba suffered a back injury in the match against Sporting. | |

== Sources ==
- Rogers, Jonathon (3 August 2022). "What's new in the Premier League this season". Arsenal FC.
- Rogers, Jonathon (2 September 2022). "Summer transfer window round-up". Arsenal FC.
- Rogers, Jonathon (4 October 2022). "Check out our 2022/23 official men's team photo". Arsenal FC.
- Rogers, Jonathon (20 November 2022). "Things Gooners need to know during the World Cup". Arsenal FC.
- James, Josh (22 December 2022). "Behind the numbers of our superb start to 2022/23". Arsenal FC.
- Rogers, Jonathon (1 February 2023). "January transfer window round-up". Arsenal FC.
- Rogers, Jonathon (29 May 2023). "103 goals! The stats behind this season's century". Arsenal FC.
- James, Josh (31 May 2023). "Games, goals and records: 2022/23 in numbers". Arsenal FC.
- Rogers, Jonathon (2 June 2023). "Strange stats and obscure records broken in 22/23". Arsenal FC.
- The Arsenal Season Review 2022/23 | Part 1. Arsenal FC. 16 July 2023 – via YouTube.
- The Arsenal Season Review 2022/23 | Part 2. Arsenal FC. 17 July 2023 – via YouTube.
- "Financial results for 2022/23". Arsenal FC. 26 February 2024.
