= Deaths in May 1978 =

The following is a list of notable deaths in May 1978. Entries for each day are listed alphabetically by surname. A typical entry lists information in the following sequence:

- Name, age, country of citizenship at birth, subsequent country of citizenship (if applicable), reason for notability, cause of death (if known), and reference.

== May 1978 ==
=== 1 ===
- Edgar Church, 89, American illustrator and art collector.
- Claude Corbitt, 62, American baseball player.
- Felix du Plessis, 58, South African rugby player.
- Aram Khachaturian, 74, Soviet Armenian composer ("Sabre Dance").
- Rooney McInerney, 47, American judge.
- Bobby Pacho, 66, American boxer.
- James Reeves, 68, English author.
- Herbert J. Taylor, 85, American businessman and civic leader.
- Boris Vladimirov, 73, Soviet general.
- Sylvia Townsend Warner, 84, English novelist (Lolly Willowes).
- Nina Barr Wheeler, 68, American artist.
- Hans Severus Ziegler, 84, German publicist and Nazi official.

=== 2 ===
- Robert P. Anderson, 72, American judge.
- Joe Bedenk, 80, American football and baseball player and coach.
- Guy Big, 32, Canadian actor (The Hilarious House of Frightenstein), throat cancer.
- Boronia Lucy Giles, 68, Australian journalist, arterial dissection.
- Matti Lähde, 66, Finnish Olympic skier (1936).
- Mira McKinney, 85, American actress.
- Slobodan Perović, 51, Serbian actor.
- Ned Porter, 66, Irish hurler.
- Albino SyCip, 90, Filipino banker and businessman (Chinabank).
- Vong Savang, 46, Laotian royal.

=== 3 ===
- Carl Brazell, 60, American football player.
- Bill Downs, 63, American journalist, laryngeal cancer.
- Viththal Dattatreya Ghate, 83, Indian author.
- A. Arnold Gillespie, 78, American set designer and special effects artist.
- Vivi Laurent-Täckholm, 80, Swedish botanist and author.
- Charles Mapp, 74-75, British politician, MP (1959–1970).
- Roberto Pineda, 25, Mexican jockey, fall from horse.
- Pinchas Rosen, 91, German-born Israeli politician, MK (1949–1968).

=== 4 ===
- Altab Ali, 24, Bangladeshi textile worker, stabbed.
- Gerald Brockhurst, 87, British painter.
- Henri Curiel, 63, Egyptian communist activist, shot.
- Kolbjørn Fjeld, 76, Norwegian publisher and librarian.
- Bernard G. Gordon, 61, American politician, member of the New York State Assembly (1961–1964) and State Senate (since 1965), cancer.
- Oliver J. Hart, 85, American Episcopalian prelate, complications from a fall.
- Henryk Magnuski, 69, Polish-American telecommunications engineer, cancer.

=== 5 ===
- W.W.W. Awori, 52, Kenyan journalist and politician.
- Heinz Bongartz, 83, German conductor and composer.
- Lionel Bull, 89, Australian veterinarian.
- Baron Feyzi, 84-85, Turkish footballer.
- Harold Gilligan, 81, English cricketer.
- Kirtley F. Mather, 90, American geologist.
- Ján Móry, 85, Czechoslovak composer.
- George Mottershead, 83, English zookeeper.
- Kurissery Gopala Pillai, 64, Indian linguist.
- Igor B. Polevitzky, 66, Russian-born American architect, house fire.
- Errett P. Scrivner, 80, American politician, member of the U.S. House of Representatives (1943–1959).
- Margaret Thorp, 85, English-Australian peace activist.

=== 6 ===
- Sir Hubert Acland, 87, English naval officer.
- Ethelda Bleibtrey, 76, American Olympic swimmer (1920 Summer Olympics), three-time gold medalist.
- Ted Firth, 72, New Zealand businessman.
- Loyal Griggs, 71, American cinematographer (The Ten Commandments, Shane, White Christmas).
- Dale Hansen, 57, American football player.
- Chris Harrington, 81, English footballer.
- Doug Rowe, 68, English footballer.

=== 7 ===
- Red Armstrong, 75, American football player.
- Augusto Codecá, 71, Argentine actor.
- Claude Ely, 55, American singer and songwriter, heart attack.
- Edith Somborn Isaacs, 93, American playwright and civic leader.
- Lita Prahl, 73, Norwegian actress and costume designer.
- Zygmunt Plater-Zyberk, 76, Polish architect.
- Raymond Rallier du Baty, 96, French sailor and surveyor.
- Mort Weisinger, 63, American comic book editor (Aquaman).
- Tom Wilhelmsen, 66, Norwegian shipping magnate.

=== 8 ===
- T. C. Cannon, 31, American artist, traffic collision.
- Eileen Crowe, 79, Irish actress.
- Juan Evaristo, 75, Argentine footballer.
- Mario Ferri, 51, Italian politician.
- Duncan Grant, 93, Scottish artist.
- Charley Hyatt, 70, American basketball player, cancer.
- Sir Abdool Razack Mohamed, 71, Indian-born Mauritian politician
- Winarti Partaningrat, 55, Indonesian librarian and government official.
- Carlos Queiroz, 76, Portuguese Olympic sports shooter (1948).
- Sarah Towles Reed, 96, American educator and trade unionist.
- Raymond Rubicam, 85, American advertising executive.
- Violet Rodgers, 64, British museum curator.
- David Sánchez Morales, 52, American intelligence operative.
- Key Sato, 71, Japanese painter.
- Henri Scheibenstock, 84, Swiss-born French footballer.
- Valentine Sewell, 68, English cricketer.
- Klara Amalie Skoglund, 86, Norwegian politician.

=== 9 ===
- Halvor Bunkholt, 74, Norwegian politician.
- Miguel Ángel Cárcano, 88, Argentine diplomat and politician.
- Urbano Cioccetti, 72, Italian politician, mayor of Rome (1958–1961).
- Enrique de la Mora, 70, Mexican architect.
- Sir Denham Henty, 74, Australian politician.
- Marguerite Hicks, 86, American socialite and book collector.
- Giuseppe Impastato, 30, Italian anti-mafia activist, explosion.
- Albert Laprade, 94, French architect.
- George Maciunas, 46, Lithuanian-born American artist, pancreatic cancer.
- Aldo Moro, 61, Italian politician, prime minister (1963–1968, 1974–1976), shot.
- Dorothy Steeves, 86, Dutch-Canadian politician.

=== 10 ===
- Hugh Ernest Butler, 61, British astronomer.
- Samuel Broadus Earle, 100, American academic administrator.
- Walter Andrew Foery, 87, American Roman Catholic prelate.
- Jimmy Gray, 77, Scottish footballer.
- Htin Aung, 68, Burmese historian and diplomat.
- Boris Khaikin, 73, Soviet conductor.
- Rafael Pérez Perry, 66, Puerto Rican businessman, heart attack.
- Käthe Voderberg, 67, German botanist.
- Vladimír Vondráček, 83, Czech psychiatrist.

=== 11 ===
- Bill de Freitas, 54, Guyanese cricketer.
- Dave Kerr, 68, Canadian ice hockey player.
- Reinaldo Nuñez, 76, Chilean politician.
- Philip Ray, 79, English actor.

=== 12 ===
- Robert Coogan, 53, American actor (Skippy).
- Kenneth W. Dyal, 67, American politician, member of the U.S. House of Representatives (1965–1967).
- Myron M. Kinley, 81, American firefighter, heart failure.
- Vasili Merkuryev, 74, Soviet actor.
- Alois Pernerstorfer, 65, Austrian singer.
- Mieczysław Szczurek, 55, Polish footballer.
- Louis Zukofsky, 74, American poet.

=== 13 ===
- Marzieh Arfa, 76–77, Ottoman-born Iranian general.
- Walt Blackadar, 55, American whitewater kayaker, drowned.
- Práxedes Giner Durán, 85, Mexican politician.
- Herb Hardt, 72, American billiards player.
- Jan Heřmánek, 70, Czechoslovak Olympic boxer (1928).
- Joseph R. Jelinek, 58, American general, cancer.
- Everett Franklin Lindquist, 76, American educator, creator of the ACT test, heart disease.
- Henk Mulders, 73, Dutch footballer.
- Anton Charles Pegis, 72, American-Canadian philosopher and academic administrator.
- André Plassart, 88, French archaeologist.
- Stanislav Rajdl, 66, Czech Olympic boxer (1936).
- Joie Ray, 84, American Olympic runner (1920, 1924, 1928).
- Alby Roberts, 70, New Zealand cricketer.
- Elsie Shrigley, 78, English vegetarian activist.
- Sisavang Vatthana, 70, Laotian royal, king (1959–1975).
- Eric Treacy, 71, English Anglican prelate and photographer, heart attack.
- Jonas Vabalas, 69, Lithuanian athlete and military officer.
- Tom Watson, 77, Northern Irish footballer.

=== 14 ===
- Henri Chapron, 91, French automobile designer.
- Phil Griffiths, 72, Welsh footballer.
- Robert Furneaux Jordan, 73, English architect and novelist.
- Alexander Kipnis, 87, Russian-American singer.
- Bill Lear, 75, American engineer, businessman and inventor, leukemia.
- Sir Paul Mason, 73, British diplomat.
- Henry Winston Newson, 68, American chemist and physicist, vascular disease.
- Ya'akov Riftin, 71, Russian-born Israeli politician, MK (1949–1965).
- Artashes Shahinian, 71, Soviet Armenian mathematician.
- Sir Michael West, 72, British general.

=== 15 ===
- Kiku Amino, 78, Japanese writer.
- Johnnie Ruth Clarke, 58, American educator and activist, cancer.
- Dorothy Coburn, 72, American actress and stuntwoman, emphysema.
- Herman Dunlap, 70, American baseball player.
- Constance Margaret Eardley, 67, Australian botanist.
- Eugene Vernon Harris, 65, American photographer, heart attack.
- Ralph Lowell, 87, American banker and philanthropist, pneumonia.
- Sir Robert Menzies, 83, Australian politician, prime minister (1939–1941, 1949–1966), heart attack.
- Walter Richard Miles, 93, American psychologist, cardiorespiratory failure.
- Friedrich Müller, 71, German footballer.
- Maurice Olivier, 91, French footballer.
- Ouyang Qin, 77–78, Chinese politician.
- Shang Zhen, 89, Chinese general.
- Kurt Stössel, 70, German footballer.
- Emlyn Watkins, 73, Welsh rugby player.

=== 16 ===
- Goffredo Alessandrini, 73, Italian filmmaker.
- Laura Bragg, 96, American museum director.
- Frank Hatton, 56, British politician, MP (since 1973).
- Diana Hay, 23rd Countess of Erroll, 52, British hereditary peer, member of the House of Lords (since 1964).
- Søren Alfred Jensen, 87, Danish Olympic gymnast (1912).
- Sir Gerald Lathbury, 71, British general.
- Ignatius Pi Shushi, 81, Chinese Roman Catholic prelate.
- A. E. Smith, 98, English-born Australian violin maker.
- William Steinberg, 78, German-American conductor.
- George Volkert, 86, British aircraft designer.
- Mike Wilson, 81, American football and baseball player.

=== 17 ===
- Vic Hurt, 79, American football coach.
- Selwyn Lloyd, Baron Selwyn-Lloyd, 73, British politician, MP (1945–1976) and member of the House of Lords (since 1976), brain cancer.
- Golan Maaka, 74, New Zealand physician.
- Ljubiša Stevanović, 68, Yugoslav footballer.
- Jan van Balkum, 90, Dutch Olympic sports shooter (1924).
- Armin T. Wegner, 91, German human rights activist and author.

=== 18 ===
- Stewart Adams, 73, Canadian ice hockey player.
- Émile Bollaert, 87, French politician and colonial administrator.
- Gerhard Danelius, 65, German politician.
- Václav Dobiáš, 68, Czech composer.
- Giuseppe Lippi, 74, Italian Olympic runner (1932, 1936).
- Barbara Lull, 73, American violinist.
- Bashar Rashid, 29, Iraqi footballer, executed.
- Anna Salvatore, 54–55, Italian painter, brain aneurysm.
- Norman Smith, 80, English football player and manager.
- Cyril Tolley, 82, English golfer and politician.
- Wei Tao-ming, 78, Taiwanese politician, pneumonia and heart failure.
- Erik Wisén, 88, Swedish diplomat.

=== 19 ===
- Nils Althin, 73, Swedish Olympic boxer (1932).
- Norberto Aroldi, 46, Argentine actor and screenwriter, lung cancer.
- Harold Bounsall, 80, Canadian Olympic cyclist (1920).
- Alice Margaret Coats, 72, British artist.
- George Gladstone, 77, Jamaican cricketer.
- Carl Hansen, 80, Danish football player and manager.
- Teddy Hill, 68, American jazz musician.
- Gertrude Horton, 76, British feminist activist, stroke.
- Ryuichi Kaji, 81, Japanese journalist and author.
- Albert Kivikas, 80, Estonian writer and journalist.
- Moses Kotane, 72, South African politician and activist.
- Nataliia Lebedeva, 83, Soviet anthropologist.
- Bert Lock, 75, English cricketer.
- Mac McCutcheon, 65, Canadian politician, MP (1963–1972), heart attack.
- Eddie Rosenbrock, 70, Australian footballer.

=== 20 ===
- Dick Been, 63, Dutch footballer.
- Bjarne Brustad, 83, Norwegian violinist and composer.
- Clifford Burton, 46, English cricketer.
- Robert Byrd, 73, American architect.
- Ernest Cadine, 84, French Olympic weightlifter (1920).
- Walther Eichrodt, 87, German theologian.
- Wilmot Fleming, 61, American politician, member of the Pennsylvania House of Representatives (1963–1964) and Senate (since 1964), heart attack.
- Judy Harlan, 81, American football player.
- Théo Kueny, 83, French Olympic wrestler (1924).
- Bob Logan, 68, American baseball player.
- John Mendelson, 60, Polish-born British politician, MP (since 1959), heart attack.
- Joseph Otterbeen, 79, Belgian Olympic runner (1920).
- P. S. Subrahmanya Sastri, 87, Indian linguist and translator.

=== 21 ===
- John Burroughs, 71, American politician, governor of New Mexico (1959–1961), pneumonia.
- Gaston Dumont, 45, Luxembourgian Olympic cyclist (1956).
- John S. Fine, 85, American politician, governor of Pennsylvania (1951–1955).
- Bruce Geller, 47, American television producer (Mission: Impossible, Mannix), plane crash.
- Waldemar Karlsson, 81, Swedish Olympic runner (1924).
- Joseph LoPiccolo, 60, American gangster, stabbed.
- Ruth Miller, 74, American artist.
- Antun Pogačnik, 65, Croatian football player and manager.
- Jo Spier, 77, Dutch artist and illustrator.
- Tukojirao Holkar III, 87, Indian royal, maharaja of Indore (1903–1926).
- Gustaf von Numers, 65, Finnish artist and civil servant.

=== 22 ===
- Joseph Colombo, 54, American mobster, cardiac arrest.
- Sir Bernard Docker, 81, English businessman.
- Bernd Eistert, 75, German chemist.
- Aubrey Fitch, 94, American naval admiral, heart disease.
- Erich Hagen, 41, German Olympic cyclist (1956, 1960), traffic collision.
- Sir Colin Hannah, 63, Australian politician and air marshal, heart attack.
- Slavko Lukanc, 56, Yugoslav Olympic skier (1948).
- Benedict Nicolson, 63, English author and art historian.
- Pete Susko, 73, American baseball player.
- Sir Richard Wild, 65, New Zealand judge, brain cancer.
- Gheorghe Zane, 81, Romanian economist and historian.

=== 23 ===
- Robert Llewellyn Bradshaw, 61, Kittitian politician, premier (since 1967), prostate cancer.
- Marie Bryant, 60, American dancer, singer and choreographer, cancer.
- Peter Chamberlin, 59, English architect.
- Carita Doggett Corse, 87, American writer and historian.
- Thomas Christian Kavanagh, 65, American civil engineer.
- Rose Lindsay, 92, Australian model and author.
- Jan Mastenbroek, 75, Dutch football manager.
- Reg Owen, 57, English conductor.
- Pierre Pêcher, 71, Belgian Olympic fencer (1928).
- Kurt Peters, 80, Austrian chemist.
- Birger Sörvik, 98, Swedish Olympic gymnast (1908).

=== 24 ===
- Cyrille Adoula, 56, Congolese politician, prime minister (1961–1964), complications from a heart attack.
- Barry Atwater, 60, American actor, stroke.
- Joe Callahan, 80, Australian footballer.
- Edwin Cooke, 75, English footballer.
- Elinore Denniston, 77, American novelist.
- Bruce McKenzie, 59, South African-born Kenyan politician, explosion.
- Lily Parr, 73, English footballer, breast cancer.
- Gerry Shury, 33, British songwriter and record producer, traffic collision.
- Abdul Majid Sindhi, 88, Indian journalist and politician.
- Sam Steinberg, 72, Hungarian-born Canadian businessman, heart failure.

=== 25 ===
- Anastacio Almeida, 48, Indian politician and trade unionist.
- A. K. D'Souza, 52, Indian playwright.
- Xhafer Deva, 74, Albanian politician.
- Hugo Helsten, 83, Danish Olympic gymnast (1920).
- Melvin Krulewitch, 82, American general.
- Biren Mitra, 60, Indian politician.
- Edgardo Seoane, 75, Peruvian politician and diplomat.
- Siriri, 73, Brazilian footballer.
- Theodor Tolsdorff, 68, German general.
- Bruno Touschek, 57, Austrian physicist.
- Miklós Tuss, 79, Hungarian Olympic sailor (1928).
- Artur Vader, 58, Estonian politician.
- Franz von Wolff-Metternich, 84, German art historian.

=== 26 ===
- Cybele Andrianou, 89, Greek actress.
- Zygmunt Chmielewski, 84, Polish actor.
- Henry Hite, 63, American actor (Monster a Go-Go).
- Jorge Icaza Coronel, 71, Ecuadorian novelist (Huasipungo), cancer.
- Tamara Karsavina, 93, Soviet-English ballerina.
- Howard Kimbo, 73, American baseball player.
- Harris McGalliard, 71, American baseball player.
- Hugh Studebaker, 77, American actor.
- Obert C. Teigen, 69, American judge.

=== 27 ===
- Willie Brown, 55, Scottish footballer.
- John Christie, 74, Scottish cricketer.
- Sir Frederick Crawford, 72, British colonial administrator.
- Konstantin Gorshenin, 70, Soviet politician.
- Tormod Kjellsen, 83, Norwegian footballer.
- Charles Kuentz, 82, American-born French Egyptologist.
- P. Kunhiraman Nair, 72, Indian author.
- Shelly Novack, 34, American football player and actor (Most Wanted), heart attack.
- William Strang, 1st Baron Strang, 85, British diplomat.
- Sir Tom Yates, 81, British trade unionist.

=== 28 ===
- Bernard Borderie, 53, French filmmaker.
- Arthur Brough, 73, British actor (Are You Being Served?).
- Vladislav Dvorzhetsky, 39, Soviet actor, heart failure.
- Lou Frost, 61, Australian footballer.
- Maurice Jewell, 92, Chilean-born English cricketer.
- Sir Joseph Molony, 70, British barrister.
- Marlowe Morris, 63, American pianist.
- Enrico Simonetti, 54, Italian pianist and composer.

=== 29 ===
- Paul Anen, 60, Luxembourgian Olympic fencer (1948, 1952).
- Sy Bartlett, 77, Russian-born American screenwriter, cancer.
- James Denny, 70, British conductor and musicologist.
- Yury Dombrovsky, 69, Soviet writer, internal bleeding.
- Sir Harry Jephcott, 87, British businessman, heart failure.
- Gunnar Berg Lampe, 86, Norwegian businessman.
- Carl Reynolds, 75, American baseball player.
- Nazli Sabri, 83, Egyptian royal, queen consort (1922–1936).
- Ali Soilih, 41, Comorian politician, president (1976–1978), shot.
- Charles Wood, 62, American actor and singer, complications from a stroke.

=== 30 ===
- Fiske Brown, 76, American football player.
- Sir David Campbell, 89, Scottish physician and pharmacologist.
- Jean Deslauriers, 68, Canadian violinist and composer, heart attack.
- Giuseppe Di Cristina, 55, Italian mobster, shot.
- Katharine Dormandy, 52, English haematologist, cancer.
- Gotthard Handrick, 69, German Olympic pentathlete (1936).
- Tetsu Katayama, 90, Japanese politician, prime minister (1947–1948).
- Bert Taylor, 66, Australian footballer.
- Larry Webb, 47, English rugby player, helicopter crash.

=== 31 ===
- Anirvan, 81, Indian writer, philosopher and Hindu monk.
- József Bozsik, 52, Hungarian footballer, heart failure.
- José Gonzalvo, 58, Spanish football player and manager.
- Hannah Höch, 88, German artist.
- Robert Hohenberger, 34–35, American serial rapist, suicide by gunshot.
- Jørgen Hustad, 82, Norwegian politician and journalist.
- Averill A. Liebow, 67, American pathologist, stroke.
- Armin Meier, 34–35, German actor, suicide.
- Hansie Oelofse, 51, South African rugby player.
- William A. Purtell, 81, American politician, member of the U.S. Senate (1952, 1953–1959).
- Charles Richard, 78, Canadian politician, MP (1958–1962).
- Lloyd Wright, 88, American architect.
