= Lulling =

Lulling may refer to:

- Astrid Lulling (born 1929), politician in Luxembourg and Member of the European Parliament
- Jérôme Lulling, a linguist in Luxembourg

== See also ==
- Lull (disambiguation)
- Lullington (disambiguation)
