= Piccolo (disambiguation) =

A piccolo is a small flute.

Piccolo may also refer to:

== Musical instruments ==
- Piccolo trumpet
- Piccolo clarinet
- Piccolo oboe
- Piccolo saxophone, better known as the soprillo
- Violino piccolo
- Violoncello piccolo
- Piccolo heckelphone
- Piccolo snare drum
- Piccolo bass

== Fictional characters ==
- Piccolo (Dragon Ball), from the Dragon Ball series
- King Piccolo, a demon king from the Dragon Ball series
- Anthony Piccolo, on the television series seaQuest DSV
- Piccolo, a Pixl from Super Paper Mario

== Other uses ==
- Piccolo (surname), a list of people
- Piccolo Teatro (Milan), Italy's first permanent theatre
- Il Piccolo, the daily newspaper of the region of Trieste, Italy
- Piccolo (1959 film), a Yugoslavian film
- Piccolo (2023 film), an Indian Marathi-language film
- Piccolo (album), a 1977 release by the Ron Carter Quartet
- Piccolo Summit, a mountain in British Columbia, Canada
- 1366 Piccolo, an asteroid
- Piccolo (firecracker), a firecracker sold in Europe
- Technoflug Piccolo, a German motor glider
- A piccolo or piccolo latte, an espresso drink similar to a cortado
- A specific implementation of zooming user interface
- A quarter-size bottle of champagne
- A form of data transmission by shortwave radio using multiple frequency-shift keying
- Piccolo protein (presynaptic cytomatrix protein), PCLO
- A medium-sized variety of cherry tomato
- Piccolo (horse)
- Piccolo, an upmarket brand of baby food
