= James Ponder (disambiguation) =

James Ponder may refer to:

- James Ponder (slave trader) (1818–1851), American slave trader
- James Ponder (1819–1897), American politician from Delaware
- James Maxie Ponder (1888–1958), American physician
