= Martin Ødegaard =

Norwegian footballer (born 1998)

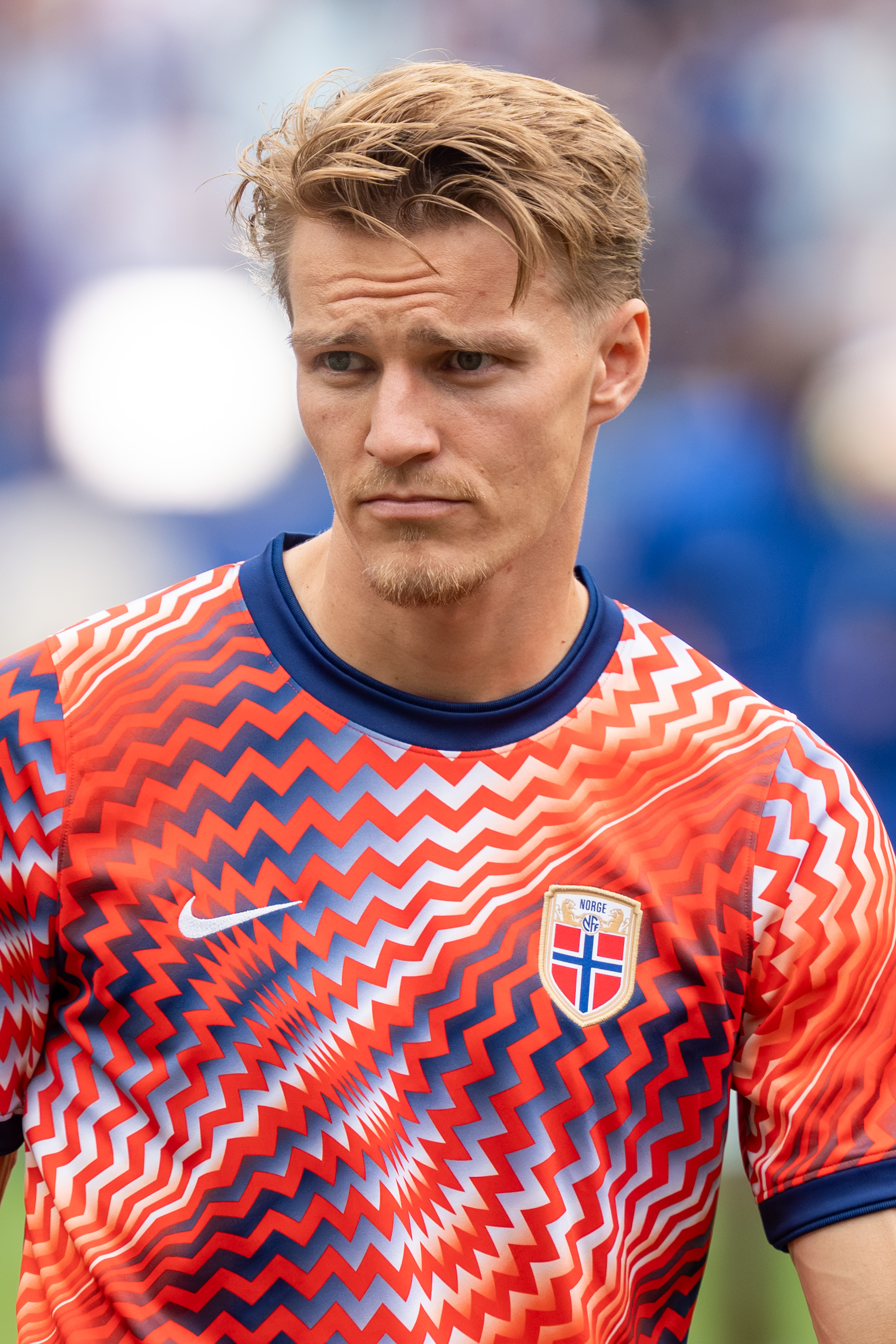
- Ødegaard with Norway in 2026

Personal information
- Full name: Martin Ødegaard
- Date of birth: 17 December 1998 (age 27)
- Place of birth: Drammen, Buskerud, Norway
- Height: 1.78 m (5 ft 10 in)
- Position: Midfielder

Team information
- Current team: Arsenal
- Number: 8

Youth career
- 2005–2009: Drammen Strong
- 2009–2014: Strømsgodset

Senior career*
Years	Team	Apps	(Gls)
2013	Strømsgodset 3	11	(4)
2013–2014	Strømsgodset 2	5	(1)
2014–2015	Strømsgodset	23	(5)
2015–2017	Real Madrid Castilla	58	(5)
2015–2021	Real Madrid	8	(0)
2017–2018	→ Heerenveen (loan)	38	(2)
2018–2019	→ Vitesse (loan)	31	(8)
2019–2020	→ Real Sociedad (loan)	31	(4)
2021	→ Arsenal (loan)	14	(1)
2021–	Arsenal	173	(37)

International career^{‡}
2013	Norway U15	2	(0)
2013–2014	Norway U16	6	(0)
2014	Norway U17	4	(0)
2014–2018	Norway U21	18	(5)
2014–	Norway	79	(6)
- * Club domestic league appearances and goals as of 19:39, 21 November 2026 (UTC) ‡ National team caps and goals as of 21:50, 17 November 2026 (UTC)

Martin Ødegaard (Norwegian pronunciation: [ˈmɑ̀ʈːɪn ˈø̀ːdəˌɡoːɾ]; born 17 December 1998) is a Norwegian professional footballer who plays as a midfielder for and captains both Premier League club Arsenal and the Norway national team.

Ødegaard began his senior club career at age 15 in 2014, playing for Strømsgodset; he set the Tippeligaen record for its youngest goalscorer, and in 2015, signed for Real Madrid in a transfer worth an initial €4 million (Kr. 35 million), where he set the club record for its youngest player. After enduring sporadic playing time, Ødegaard joined Eredivisie clubs Heerenveen and Vitesse, and La Liga club Real Sociedad, on successive loans between 2017 and 2019; winning the Copa del Rey with Real Sociedad in 2019. Following a six-month loan with Arsenal in the second half of the 2020–21 season, he signed for them on a permanent deal in August 2021, in a transfer worth an initial £30 million (€35 million), and was announced as the club's captain in July 2022, later winning the Premier League with the club in the 2025–26 season.

Ødegaard made his senior international debut for Norway in 2014, at age 15, and has set the record for the youngest senior Norway player, and the youngest player to play in a UEFA European Championship qualifying match. He assumed the full captaincy of Norway in March 2021.

== Early life ==
Martin Ødegaard was born on 17 December 1998, in Drammen, Buskerud. He spent his first years in the local sports club Drammen Strong. His father, Hans Erik Ødegaard, a former footballer, co-founded a football section in the club, and became the coach of his son's team. In 2005, when Ødegaard was six, his parents and others each invested 50,000 kroner so that the local club could refit their gravel field, Kjappen, with artificial turf. This has been cited as crucial for his development, as Ødegaard spent countless hours on the field.

Drammen Strong was twice selected by Ødegaard to receive a prize of 50,000 kroner (€5,800), when the young player was given the Statoil talent award for April 2014 and for the 2014 season. Later, in 2015, Drammen Strong received 250,000 kroner, equivalent to approximately €29,000, as a gift from Strømsgodset Toppfotball when Ødegaard was sold to Real Madrid.

== Club career ==
=== Early career ===
In 2009, Ødegaard joined the youth division of Strømsgodset. He trained and played with older boys. The Norwegian Football Federation also organises young talents in local district teams, and Ødegaard played his first matches for the Buskerud team in January 2010, when he had just turned 11. The other players on the team, and opponents, were two to three years older. The coach noted: "Handles things brilliantly. Good choices. Good touch, smart in position game". Ødegaard trained with this team weekly for the next three years. He mostly played left back, as the coaches felt this would give him a positive experience with many ball touches while still playing against physically much stronger players. In attack, he was given free rein due to his ability to "see solutions and spaces that we as coaches were not even close to thinking about."

In 2011, at age 12, he impressed former football manager Lars Tjærnås during a nationwide tournament for under-16s:

The best 15-year-olds in the country were gathered for a tournament between the top clubs... It was definitely not the first time he had astonished his opponents or the spectators. He was three or four years younger than the others. It was impossible not to realise that we were witnessing something out of the ordinary.

=== Strømsgodset ===
Ødegaard began training with the Strømsgodset first team in 2012, aged 13. He made his first-team debut the same year, in a mid-season friendly against local rivals Mjøndalen IF. He also had short training visits to Bayern Munich and Manchester United. In 2013, at age 14, Ødegaard played for both Strømsgodset's junior team (normally aged 17–19), and the club's third team at the fifth tier of Norwegian senior football.

In January 2014, it was agreed that 15-year-old Ødegaard would be part of Strømsgodset's first team for the year, but no professional contract was signed. The competition rules state that to play in Tippeligaen, players must have a professional contract to be eligible. However, the club included Ødegaard on the "B-list" for amateur players, which made him eligible for up to three matches per season. Ødegaard was unable to train with Strømsgodset in the daytime since he was still in compulsory education. Thus, as part of the agreement, he trained two evenings a week with Mjøndalen IF, a semi-professional First Division team at the time, where his father was one of the coaches.

He made his league debut for Strømsgodset in a match against Aalesunds FK at Marienlyst Stadion on 13 April 2014. Aged 15 years and 118 days, he became the youngest footballer ever to play in Tippeligaen. On 5 May, he signed a professional contract with Strømsgodset, lasting until the end of 2015. This removed the restriction of three matches per season. Eleven days later, he scored his first professional goal and became the youngest goalscorer in Tippeligaen when he scored the fourth goal for Strømsgodset in a 4–1 home victory against Sarpsborg 08 FF. He made his European debut on 16 July, replacing Lars-Christopher Vilsvik for the final five minutes of the club's 1–0 home defeat to Steaua București in the UEFA Champions League second qualifying round.

In late July, an away match at Sandnes Ulf prompted serious discussion in national newspapers VG, Dagbladet and Aftenposten, on his possible call-up to the Norwegian national team. Ødegaard was involved in all three goals for his team, including a goal and an assist. He was also fouled for a penalty which was missed by a teammate. John Arne Riise, the most-capped player on the Norwegian national team, was impressed, and "demanded" Ødegaard should be called up to play against the big nations of Europe. Former manager for Norway, Nils Johan Semb, said after the match that "Martin is one of the best 15-year-olds in Europe", but added that he should not be rushed into the national team. Ødegaard himself stated to the press that if he would be asked to play for Norway, he would say yes.

In the away match against IK Start on 15 August the same year, Ødegaard was placed on the right wing, and made all three assists for Strømsgodset, who won 3–2. He scored two goals in a match for the first time in his career in the 2–1 win against Lillestrøm SK on 19 October. Strømsgodset finished fourth in the league, qualifying for the first qualifying round of the UEFA Europa League, with Ødegaard having scored 5 goals in 23 league games in addition to 7 assists.

In December 2014, during the Norwegian close season, he trained with the first teams at Liverpool, Bayern Munich and visited Arsenal's London Colney.

=== Real Madrid ===
==== 2015–2017: Early Real Madrid career ====
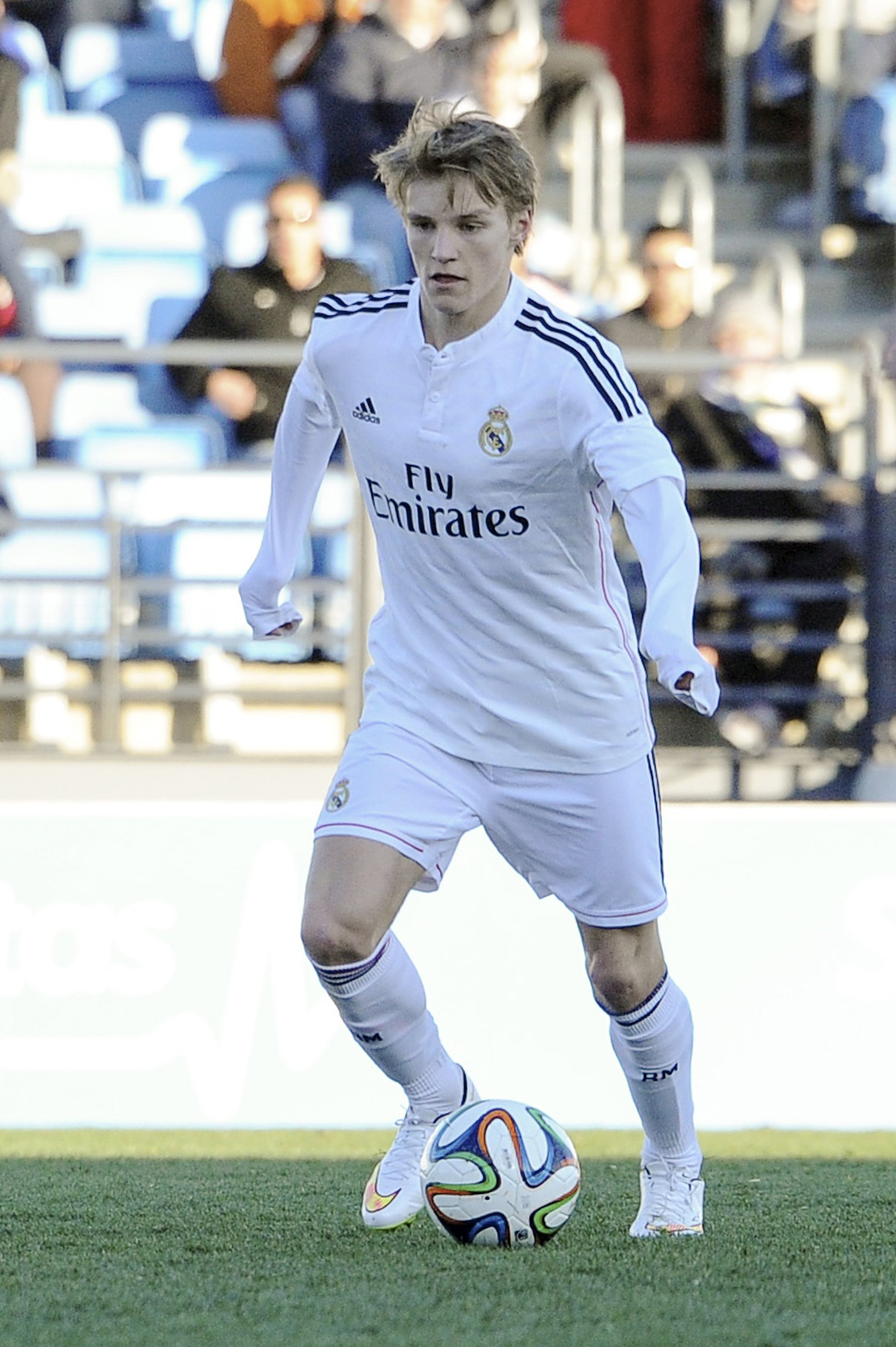
Ødegaard playing for Real Madrid Castilla in 2015

On 21 January 2015, Real Madrid reached an agreement to sign Ødegaard from Strømsgodset, after training with the senior team earlier in the month. The fee reported by Spanish media was around €3 million. Norwegian media reported, however, that the fee was 35 million kroner (approximately €4 million), which could rise to 70–75 million kroner (approximately €8–8.5 million) on certain conditions. In a press conference after the signing, Real Madrid announced that Ødegaard would train with both the club's first team and the reserves, Real Madrid Castilla. He would play for the latter team, which was managed by Zinedine Zidane at the time.

He made his unofficial debut for the reserves on 4 February, in a 3–3 friendly draw with Beijing Guoan. He was subsequently named in the first team's Champions League squad. Ødegaard was assigned the number 21. His official debut for Castilla came on 8 February, coming on in the last 20 minutes as a substitute in the 2–2 draw against Athletic Bilbao B in Segunda División B. On 21 February, he scored his first goal for the club in a 4–0 win over Barakaldo, opening the scoring after seven minutes.

In April, Ødegaard was dropped from Castilla after a run of four defeats, with staff finding problems with him training with the first team while playing for the reserves, in addition to a language barrier. First-team manager Carlo Ancelotti called for fans to be patient while Ødegaard settles in a new country. On 29 April, he was included in Real Madrid's matchday squad for the first time for a home La Liga fixture against Almería, as Ancelotti was without Gareth Bale, Luka Modrić, and Karim Benzema through injury. However, he did not feature in the 3–0 victory.

On 23 May, in the final fixture of the season, he made his debut for Real Madrid as a 58th-minute substitute for hat-trick scorer and then-reigning Ballon d'Or winner Cristiano Ronaldo in an eventual 7–3 home win over Getafe. He became the youngest debutant in the history of the club at 16 years and 157 days old.

Ødegaard was a regular starter for Castilla during the 2015–16 season. On 17 April 2016, he was praised in Diario AS for his performance in a 3–0 home win over SD Gernika Club, winning a penalty kick which Mariano scored. The result put the team top of the table. The team won the group ahead of Barakaldo CF on the last day, with Ødegaard scoring his first of the season in a 6–1 win over La Roda CF.

Ødegaard made his first start for Real Madrid on 30 November 2016, 679 days after signing for the club. He played the full 90 minutes against Cultural Leonesa in the Copa del Rey round of 32 as Madrid won 6–1.

==== 2017–2020: Loans in Netherlands and Spain ====
On 10 January 2017, Dutch club Heerenveen confirmed that Ødegaard had joined them on loan for 18 months. He had also been close to agreeing a deal with Barcelona, according to his agent, but the Catalan's club transfer ban at the time proved a pivotal factor. He made his Eredivisie debut four days later in a 2–0 home win over ADO Den Haag, replacing Arbër Zeneli in the last seconds. After the game, he spoke to Fox Sports about how he was pleased with his new surroundings. His start to his time at Heerenveen was poor, having only one shot and one assist in his first seven games, and he was later confined to the substitutes' bench by manager Jurgen Streppel. He scored his first goal for the Frisians on 18 May in his 15th appearance, a 3–1 home loss to Utrecht in the first-leg of a play-off semi-final (5–2 aggregate).

In the 2017–18 season, Ødegaard became a regular starter. He scored his first regular-season goal for Heerenveen on 18 November 2017, in a 4–0 win against Twente.

On 21 August 2018, Real Madrid announced that Ødegaard would be loaned again for the 2018–19 season, joining another Eredivisie club, Vitesse. He managed to score 11 goals and 12 assists in his season with Vitesse, he was also voted as the club's player of the year by the fans.

On 5 July 2019, he was loaned to Real Sociedad for one season, with Real Madrid retaining the option to recall the player or extend the loan for an additional season after the first year. On 25 August, he scored his first La Liga goal in a 1–0 victory over Mallorca at the Estadi Mallorca San Moix. On 14 September, he scored his second goal for the club in a 2–0 home victory over Atletico Madrid at the Anoeta Stadium, in what was regarded by pundits as a man-of-the-match performance. He registered his first assist with a 20-yard line-breaking pass to Mikel Oyarzabal against fellow Basques Deportivo Alavés, in a move praised by fans and pundits alike for its technique. In September 2019, Ødegaard was named La Liga Player of the Month.

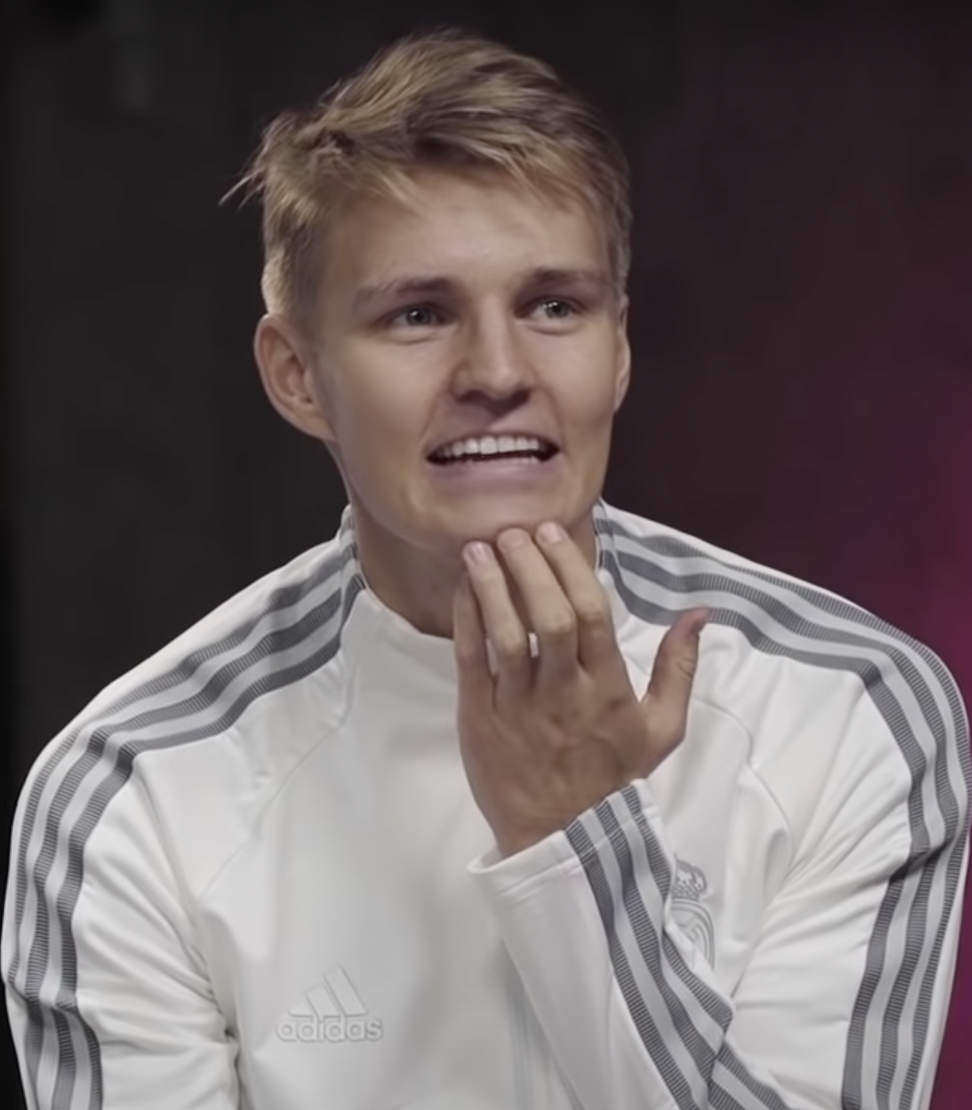
Ødegaard with Real Madrid in 2020

In February 2020, he scored against Real Madrid to help his loan club eliminate his parent club in the quarter-finals of Copa del Rey. Real Sociedad reached the final of the competition, but it was postponed due to the COVID-19 pandemic in Spain; they also qualified for the UEFA Europa League after finishing sixth in La Liga and the season was a successful one for Ødegaard on a personal level. He missed the end of the season having been diagnosed in June with tendinopathy, a problem that had also occurred some months earlier.

After being recalled from loan by Real Madrid in 2020, Ødegaard started the club's opening game of the 2020–21 La Liga season away to Real Sociedad, in a 0–0 draw. On 25 November, he made his Champions League debut for Real Madrid in a 2–0 away win over Inter Milan.

=== Arsenal ===
==== 2020–21: Midseason loan ====
After making only nine appearances during Real Madrid's opening half of the season following his loan spell at Real Sociedad, Ødegaard made it clear he wanted to leave the club during the winter transfer window in search of first-team football. On 27 January 2021, Ødegaard joined English club Arsenal on loan until the end of the 2020–21 season. He admired the club's direction and the team's style of play, from which he decided that Arsenal would be "a club that really suits me well." Mikel Arteta, Arsenal's first team manager was adamant that Ødegaard would provide quality in attacking options and that everyone at the club was excited to be integrating him into Arsenal's plans.

Three days after he signed, he made his debut against rivals Manchester United in the Premier League, coming on as a substitute for Emile Smith Rowe in a 0–0 home draw. On 14 February, he made his first league start for Arsenal in a 4–2 home win over Leeds United. On 11 March, Ødegaard scored his first goal for Arsenal with a 20-yard strike in a 3–1 away win over Olympiacos in the first leg of the Europa League round of 16 tie. That goal was later voted as the Arsenal Goal of the Month. On 14 March, Ødegaard scored in back-to-back games, picking up his first Premier League goal in Arsenal's 2–1 home win over Tottenham Hotspur in the 203rd North London derby. Ødegaard was voted as Arsenal's Player of the Month for March 2021.

==== 2021–25: Permanent transfer and club captaincy ====
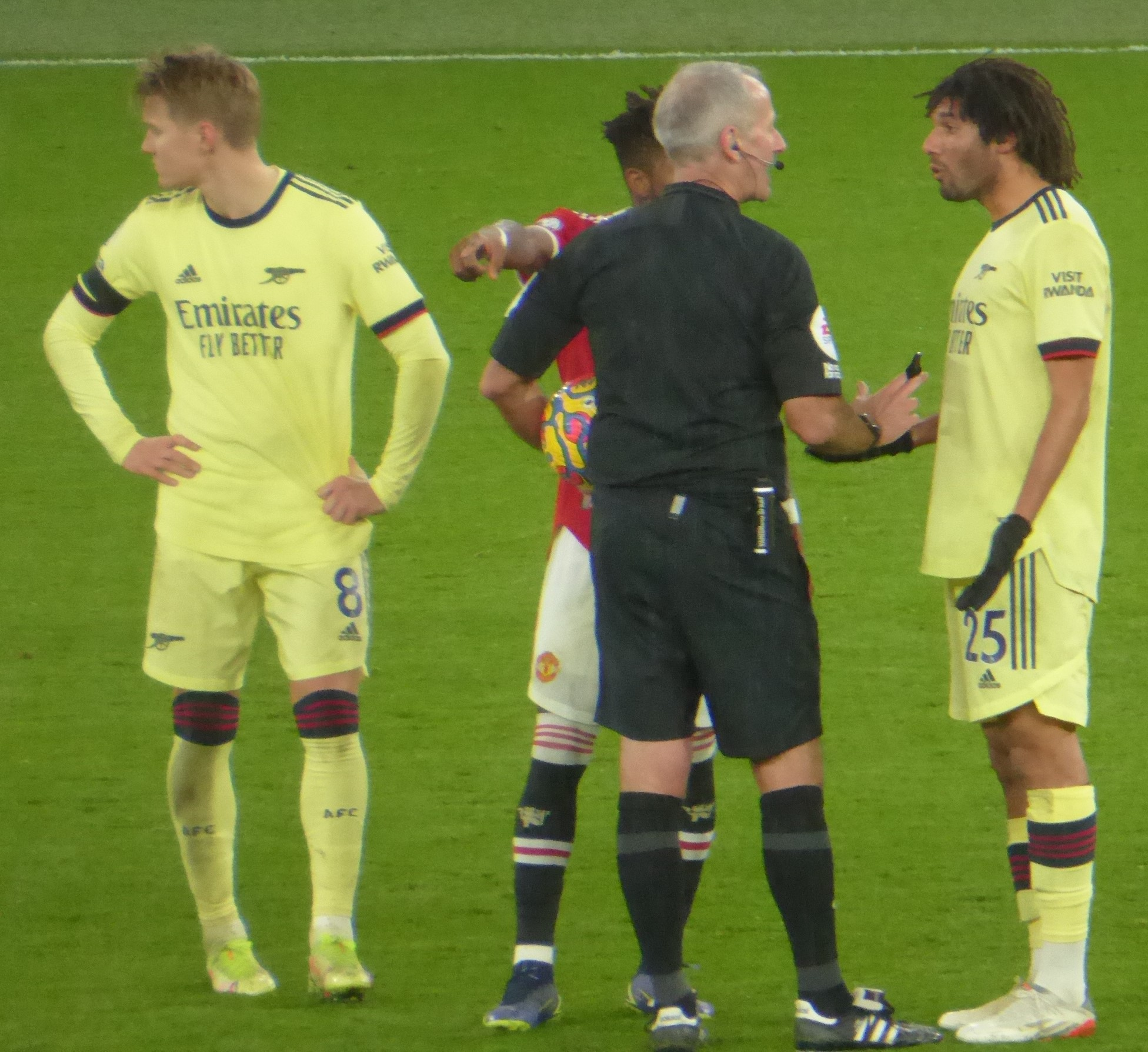
Ødegaard (left) playing for Arsenal in 2021

On 20 August 2021, Arsenal announced the permanent signing of Ødegaard in a deal worth €35 million with potential add-ons rising to around €40 million. Ødegaard signed a four-year deal until 2025 with the club having an option to extend for a fifth year. He would make his first appearance of the 2021–22 season in a 5–0 away defeat against Manchester City. He scored his first goal of the season with a free-kick in a 1–0 away win against Burnley, giving Arsenal back-to-back wins. On 18 December, Ødegaard notched his first assist of the season in a 4–1 away victory against Leeds United. He ended the month with three goals and three assists in six matches, and was nominated for the Premier League Player of the Month award. At the end of the season, Arsenal finished their Premier League season in fifth place, just missing out on UEFA Champions League football for the following season.

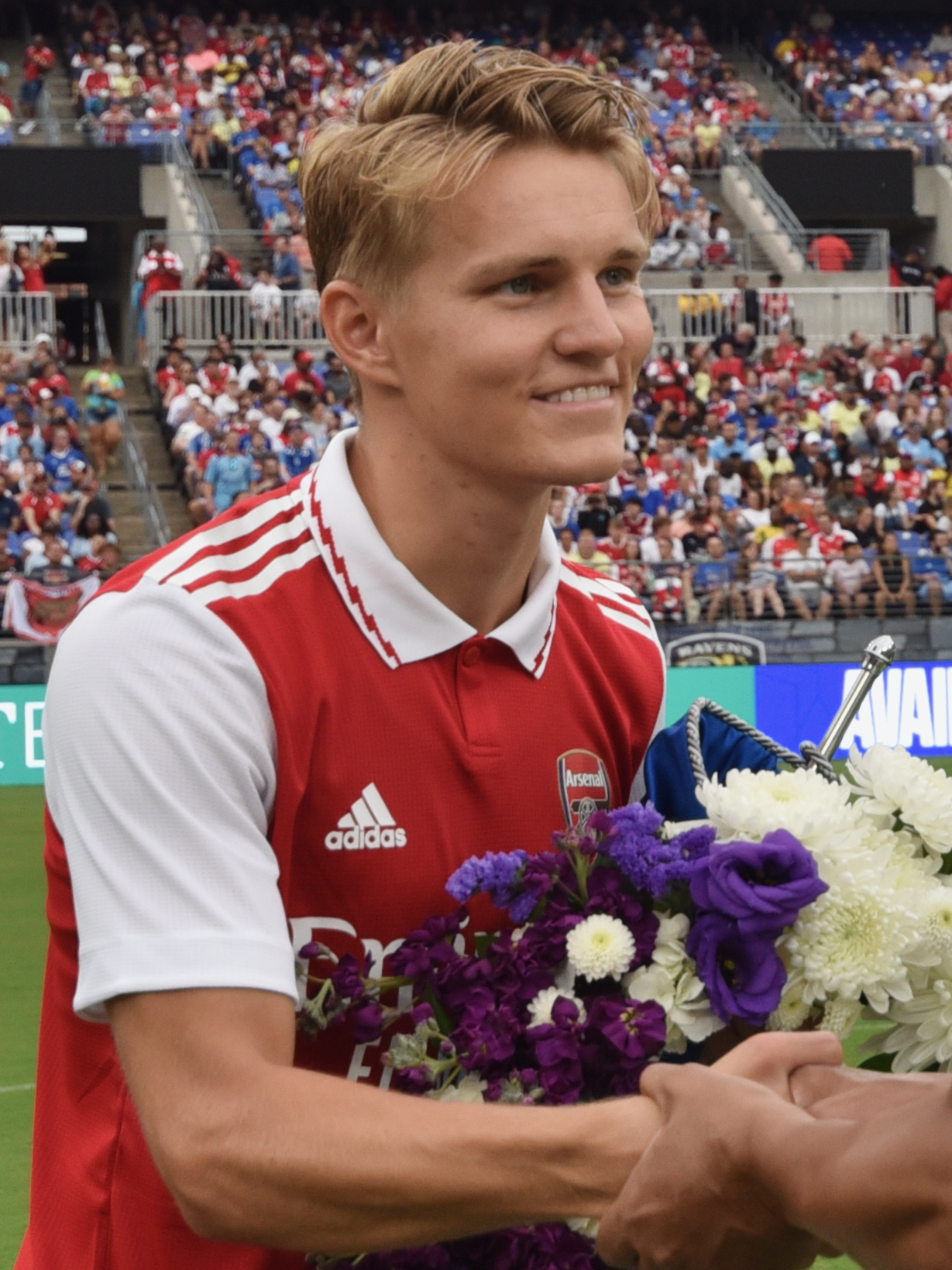
Ødegaard with Arsenal in 2022

Following the departures of previous club captain Pierre-Emerick Aubameyang and interim captain Alexandre Lacazette, Arteta named Ødegaard as the new captain for Arsenal ahead of the 2022–23 season. He made his first appearance as captain in the club's Premier League season opener against Crystal Palace, which Arsenal won 2–0. On 21 August 2022, Ødegaard scored twice in an away win against Bournemouth in the first 11 minutes of the game. On 12 November, during Arsenal's final Premier League fixture before the 2022 FIFA World Cup break, Ødegaard scored a brace against Wolverhampton Wanderers at the Molineux Stadium to keep Arsenal at the top of the league table by five points.

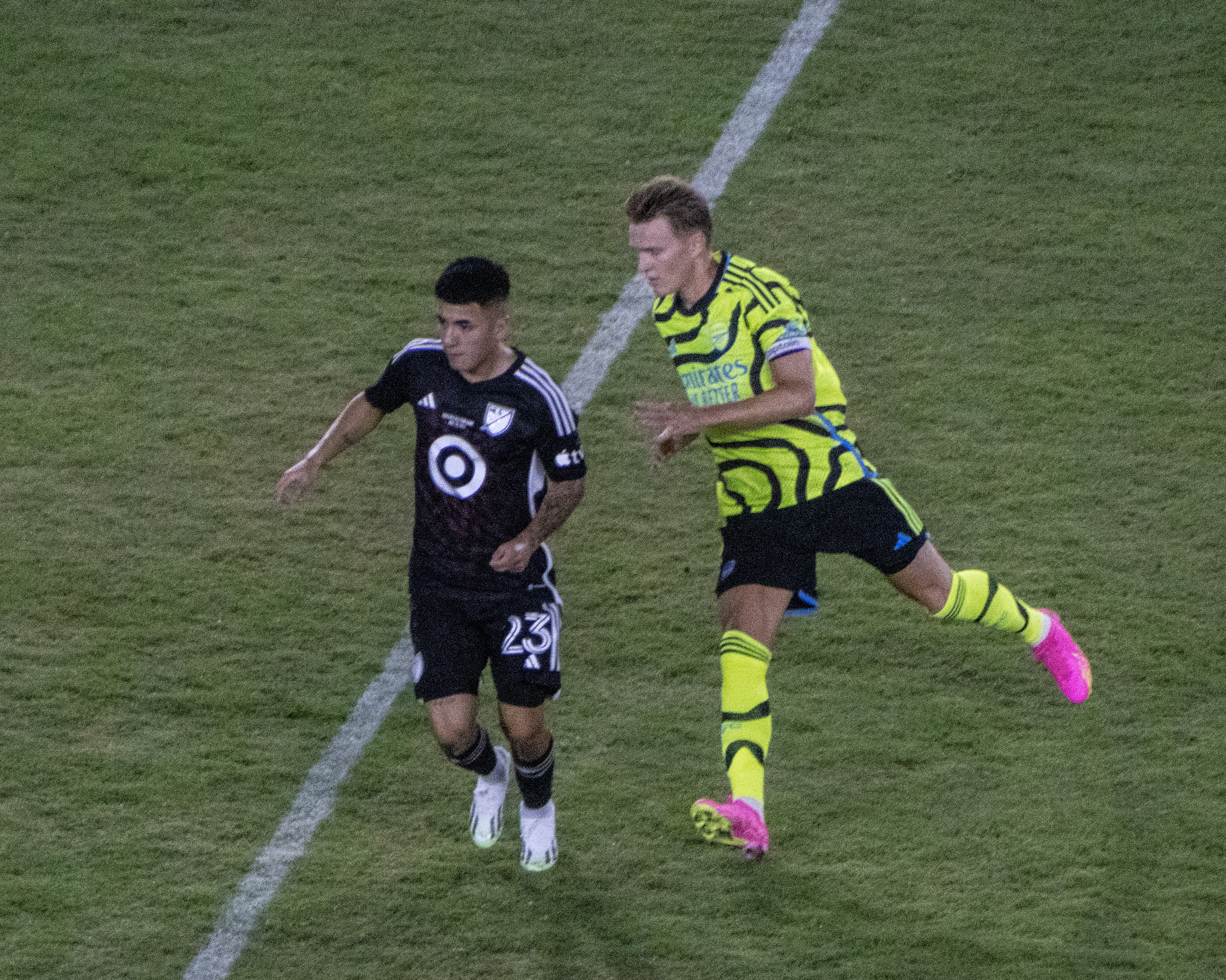
Ødegaard (right) playing for Arsenal at the 2023 MLS All-Star Game

On 26 December, Ødegaard provided two assists in Arsenal's first match since the conclusion of the World Cup, a 3–1 win over West Ham United. Ødegaard would win the Premier League Player of the Month award for November/December 2022. He became the first Arsenal player to win the award since September 2019. On 15 January 2023, Ødegaard's first-half strike guided Arsenal to a 2–0 win over Tottenham Hotspur, which was Arsenal's first away win against their rivals in the Premier League since 2014. On 13 March, he was awarded the Premier League Player of the Year award at the 2023 London Football Awards. On 2 May, Ødegaard scored a first-half brace against Chelsea, leading his team to a 3–1 victory. At the conclusion of the season, Ødegaard was voted Arsenal Player of the Season, and was also nominated for the Premier League Player of the Season, Premier League Young Player of the Season and the FWA Footballer of the Year. He was also named in the PFA Team of the Year.

On 21 August 2023, Ødegaard scored the only goal of the game against Crystal Palace from the spot in Arsenal's first away match of the 2023–24 season. It was his first attempt from the penalty spot in a league match since May 2019. On 20 September, Ødegaard scored his first Champions League goal in a 4–0 win over PSV Eindhoven, which was Arsenal's first appearance in the competition since 2017. On 22 September, Ødegaard signed a new long-term contract with Arsenal, saying it "was a really easy decision" and "I've found a place where I can be really settled and call my home."

On 11 February 2024, in a 6–0 away win against West Ham United, Ødegaard became the first player on record since 2003–04 to complete 100+ passes (107), create at least five chances (7), and assist multiple goals (2) in the same Premier League match. On 12 March, he played a crucial role in leading Arsenal to a 1–1 on agg., 4–2 on penalties victory over Porto, providing the assist for Arsenal's equaliser in the tie and helping to seal their progression to the Champions League quarter-finals for the first time in 14 years. On 23 April, Ødegaard was instrumental in a 5–0 home victory against Chelsea, assisting their third and fifth goals, and became the first Arsenal player since Mesut Özil to create eight chances from open play in a Premier League match. He ended the season as the player with the most chances created from open play in the 2023–24 Premier League season, with 88. Ødegaard was confirmed as Arsenal's Player of the Season following the end of the season, winning the award for the second time in a row.

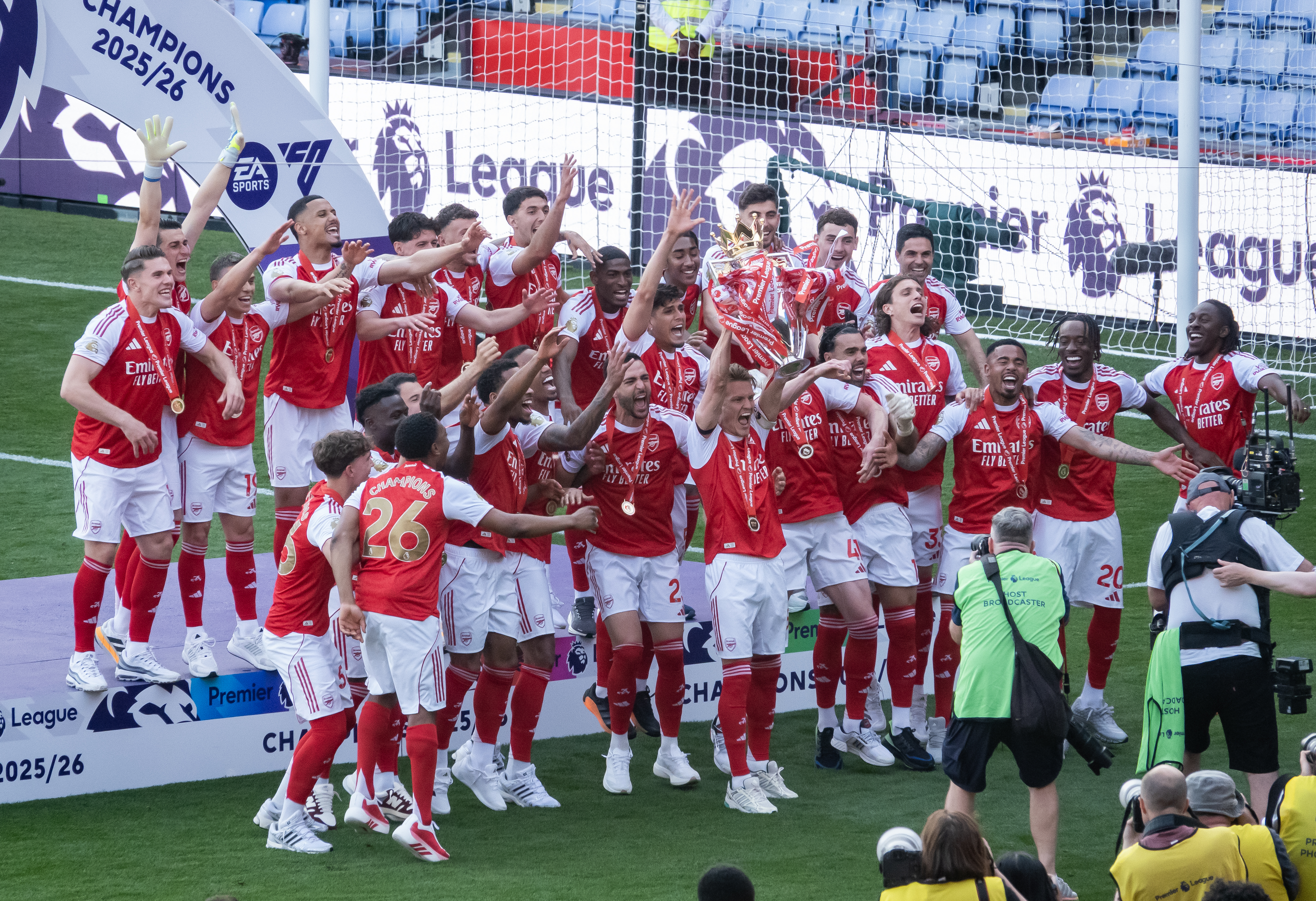
Ødegaard lifting the 2025–26 Premier League trophy at Selhurst Park in 2026

==== 2025–Present: First league title ====
On 28 September 2025, Ødegaard was impactful as a late substitute in an eventual 2–1 away win against Newcastle United, providing the assist from a corner for Gabriel's 96th minute winner. Three days later on 1 October, he was involved in both goals as Arsenal beat Olympiacos 2–0 in the Champions League. Ødegaard scored from the edge of the box in the 14th minute of a 2–1 home victory against Brighton on 27 December. On 30 December, he provided the through-ball for Martín Zubimendi's goal in Arsenal's 4–1 home win over Aston Villa. On 3 January 2026, Ødegaard played a part in two of Arsenal's three goals away to Bournemouth, earning an assist for the second. On 31 January, he assisted the fourth goal in a 4–0 win away against Leeds. Ødegaard provided a 94th minute assist as Arsenal made it four consecutive away wins at Tottenham on 22 February. On the final day of the season, on 24 May, Arsenal secured a 2–1 away victory over Crystal Palace, after which Ødegaard lifted the trophy for the club's fourth Premier League title and 14th English league championship. Later that year, on 16 August, he scored the third goal in a 3–0 victory over Manchester City in the 2026 FA Community Shield, helping his team lift another trophy.

On 21 August 2026, Ødegaard scored in a 3–0 victory over Coventry City in Arsenal's opening match of the 2026–27 Premier League season. On 6 September, he scored the winning goal against Chelsea in a 2–1 win. Ødegaard made an excellent start to the season, scoring four goals in his first five games, already surpassing his previous season's tally and being described as a "player transformed".

== International career ==
=== Youth ===
Ødegaard featured in the starting line-ups for the two home matches of the Norway national under-15 team against Sweden on 17 and 19 September 2013. Both matches were won by Norway, 2–1 and 2–0.

Ødegaard played for the Norway national under-16 team in a tournament against Scotland, the United States, and France, held in Turkey in January 2014. He played the full 90 minutes in all three matches, which resulted in a win versus Scotland and two losses.

He was promoted to the Norway national under-17 team for the away match against Iceland on 28 February 2014. Ødegaard came on as a substitute in the 62nd minute, and helped secure a 2–1 win for his country. Subsequently, he was in the starting line-up for the next three away matches; in the 3–0 win against Iceland on 2 March, in the 2–3 loss against Turkey on 25 March and finally in the 0–3 loss against Greece on 30 March 2014.

In September 2014, he was selected for the Norway national under-21 team for the final match of 2015 UEFA European Under-21 Championship qualification. He played the full match against Portugal, as a forward, but was unable to prevent the opponents from winning 2–1, despite being named Man of the Match.

An unused substitute for the senior team on 6 September 2015 against Croatia, he joined the under-21 team again the following day in the 2017 UEFA European Under-21 Championship qualification match against England. He played the full 90 minutes in the match, which Norway lost 0–1 at home after a penalty goal by James Ward-Prowse.

=== Senior ===
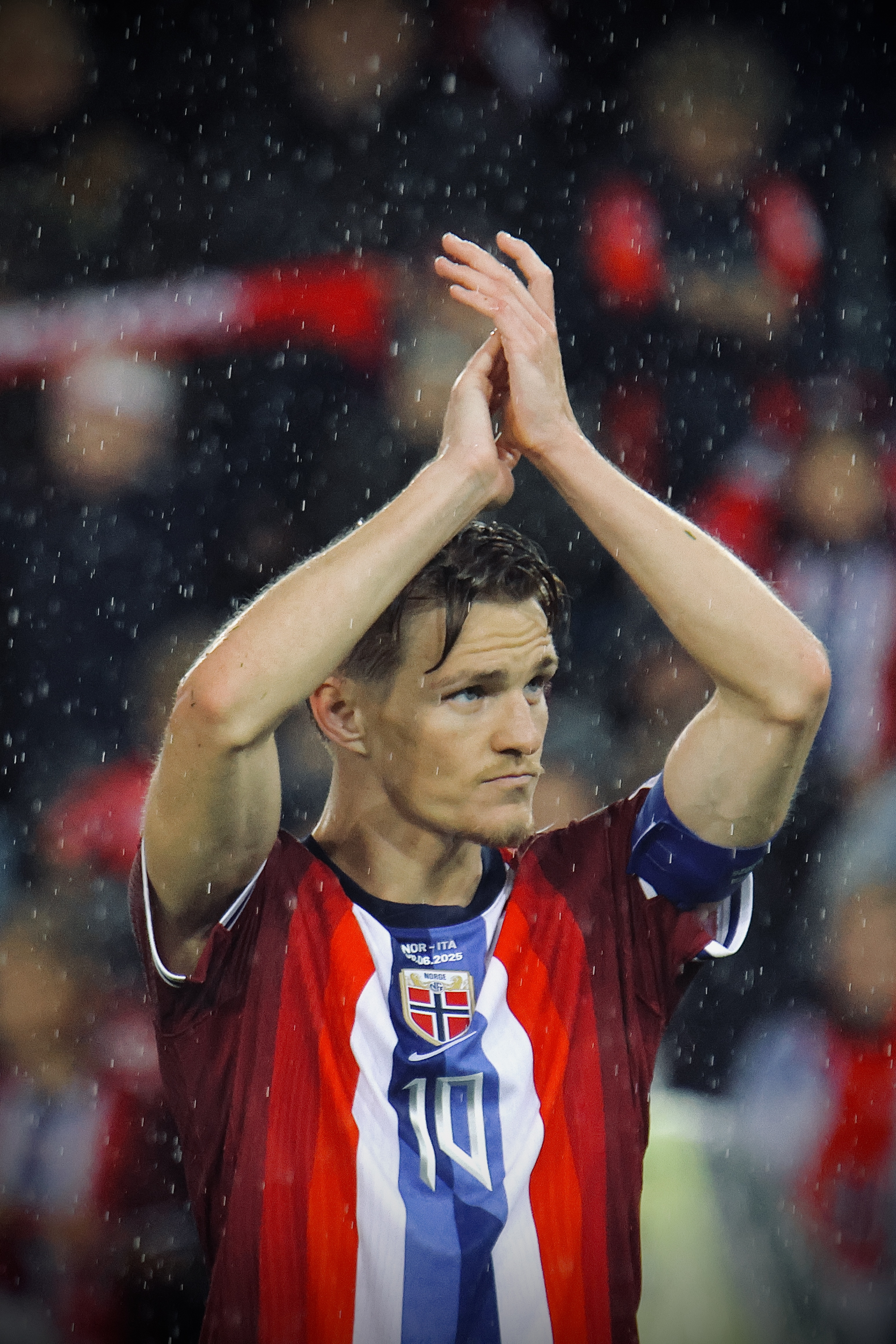
Ødegaard with Norway in 2025

On 19 August 2014, Ødegaard was called up for a senior international against the United Arab Emirates in Stavanger and played the entire goalless draw on 27 August, becoming the youngest player to play for Norway at senior level, at 15 years and 253 days. The record was previously held by Tormod Kjellsen, who was 15 years and 351 days on his debut in 1910.

On 30 September 2014, he was called up to Norway's UEFA Euro 2016 qualifying matches against Malta and Bulgaria. He made his competitive debut in the latter, replacing Mats Møller Dæhli in the 64th minute of a 2–1 home win. At the age of 15 years and 300 days, this made him the youngest player to ever play in a European Championship qualifier, breaking a record held since 1983 by Icelander Sigurður Jónsson.

On 29 March 2015, Ødegaard became the youngest player to start a European Championship qualifier at the age of 16 years and 101 days in a 5–1 loss to Croatia. On 8 June, he was man of the match in Norway's 0–0 friendly draw with Scandinavian rivals Sweden in Oslo. After Norway came third in their qualification group, Ødegaard was named in their squad for a play-off against Hungary. Unused in the first leg, he was substituted at half time in the second on 15 November, as Norway lost 2–1 on the night and 3–1 on aggregate.

After 18 months without a cap, Ødegaard's form for Heerenveen earned him a recall into Lars Lagerbäck's Norway team and he earned his 10th cap against Macedonia in November 2017. On 7 June 2019, Ødegaard scored his first international goal against Romania in a UEFA Euro 2020 qualifying match, which ended with a 2–2 draw.

In March 2021, Ødegaard was appointed as the captain for the national team by the new manager Ståle Solbakken.

In November 2025, Norway qualified for the 2026 FIFA World Cup; their first since 1998. Ødegaard ended the qualifying campaign as the player with the most assists (7) and second-most chances created (25) in Europe. Ødegaard provided three assists in his first three appearances at the 2026 World Cup as his country progressed to the round of 16, matching a record previously achieved by Igor Belanov in 1986 and Michael Ballack in 2002.

== Style of play ==
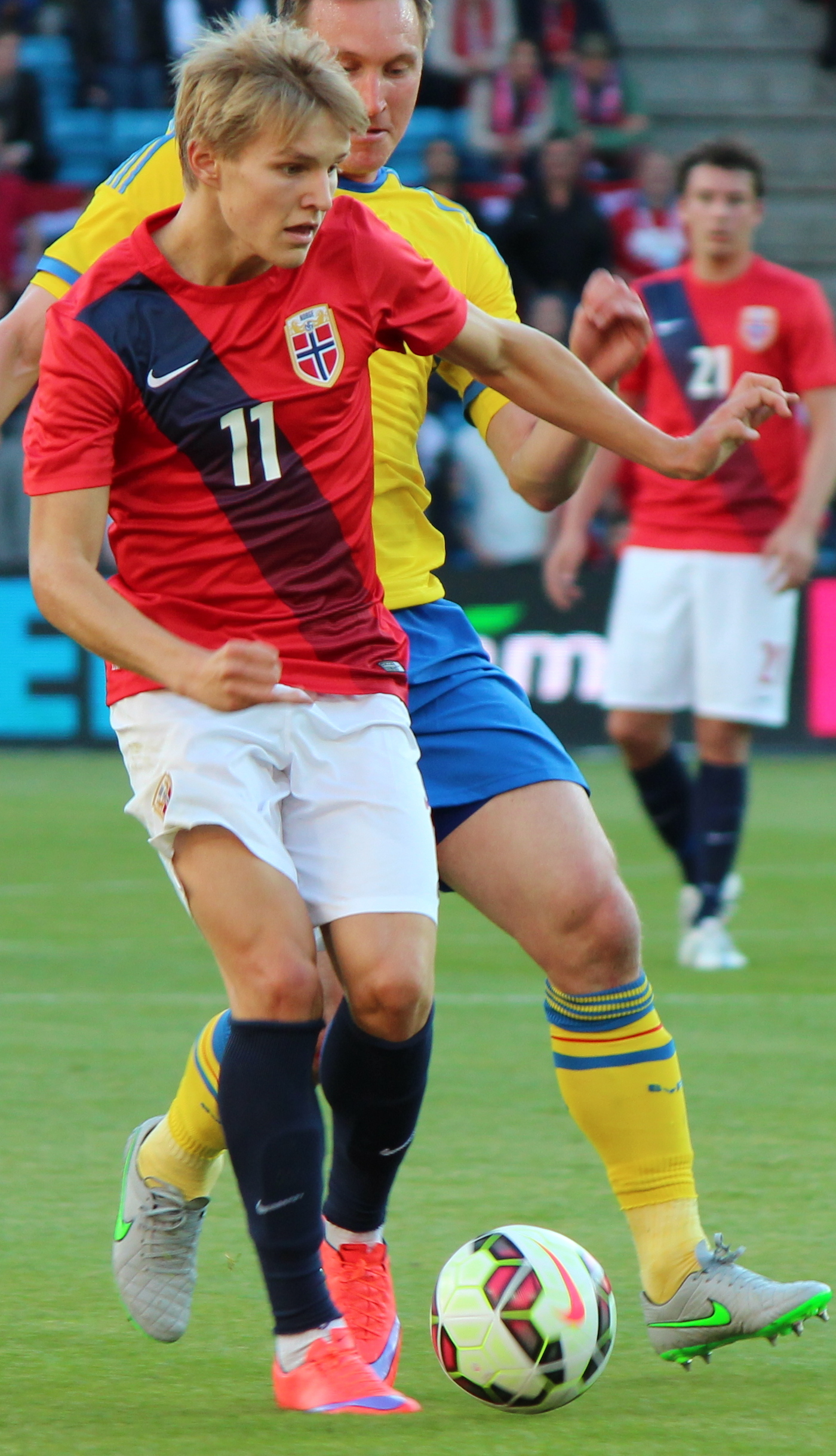
Ødegaard (pictured playing for Norway in 2015) was coached by his father to keep the ball close to his feet, to maximise control.

Touted as a "modern" playmaker known for his deft touch, technique, dribbling ability, vision and range of passing, as well as his ability to provide precise, bending deliveries from dead balls and set pieces, the left-footed Ødegaard is often compared to attacking midfielders Mesut Özil and Guti due to his creativity on the pitch and direct, incisive movement of the ball to create chances for his teammates. In addition, Arsenal manager Mikel Arteta also noted his exceptional footballing intelligence to find spaces on the pitch as well as his work-rate, stating that "he's got a real stamina and he's so talented, but his work-rate is incredible." A hardworking player, Ødegaard is an energetic, effective presser of the ball, often covering large distances to help his team win back possession. In both loan spells with Real Sociedad and Arsenal, Ødegaard was statistically one of the most productive pressers on his team.

Considered a footballing prodigy and one of the best upcoming talents of his generation in his youth, a 2014 article in the Liverpool Echo described Ødegaard as "an attack-minded midfielder very much in the modern mould. Diminutive, quick-footed, with natural balance, pace and, perhaps surprisingly for one so young, excellent shooting power". David Nielsen, his manager at Strømsgodset, likened him to David Silva and Lionel Messi. In September 2014, international teammate and Rosenborg winger Morten Gamst Pedersen dubbed Ødegaard the most talented player he had ever seen, saying "For his age he is unbelievable – his knowledge of the game is unbelievable and his technical skills are fantastic". Pedersen also stated that Ødegaard needed time to improve at the physical aspects of the sport.

When describing his son, Hans Erik Ødegaard said: "It's the pace of the game that makes the difference in adjusting to different levels. We've used so many hours in working with his first and second touch to take off the pressure. We have worked a lot on bringing the ball closely to his feet, so he can change direction quickly, so even if he's physically weaker than the others he doesn't get caught because he's able to get away."

After Ødegaard signed for Real Madrid at the age of 16, Norwegian former football scout Tor-Kristian Karlsen praised his mentality, stating that he had "overcome every challenge in front of him". Karlsen called him "so level-headed and mature" and noted his intelligence and performance at school, while also saying that this could be a disadvantage as "The best footballers tend to have a bit of needle, a bit of fire". While former Norway international Jan Åge Fjørtoft was supportive of the transfer to Real Madrid due to the opportunity to learn from Zinedine Zidane, he warned that Ødegaard needed time to develop due to his young age despite his newfound fame: "Comparing Ødegaard to Messi is nonsense from the media. Messi is a player who can make the difference and Martin can do the same, but any comparisons should not be taken seriously". Ødegaard reacted to the attention on him by saying "If you get carried away now, you won't get far in 10 years. I'm supposed to be at my best then, not now."

== Personal life ==
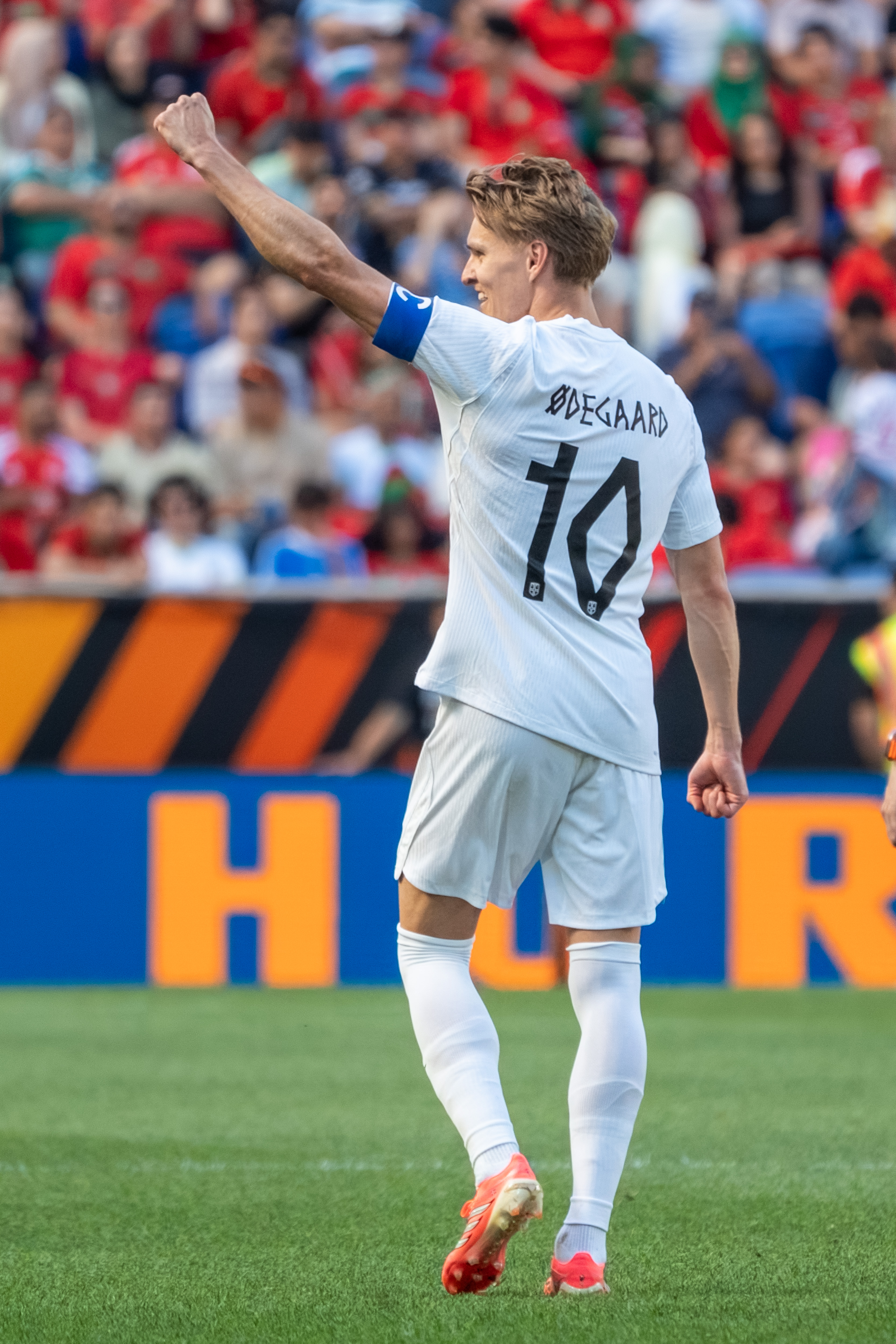
Ødegaard with Norway in 2026

Ødegaard is the son of former footballer Hans Erik Ødegaard, who played as a midfielder for Strømsgodset and Sandefjord Fotball and was assistant manager of Mjøndalen IF from 2009 to 2015. He was still attending a local lower secondary school when he made his professional debut, but has since completed his compulsory education in Norway. As a boy, Ødegaard looked up to Lionel Messi. He considers compatriot Erling Haaland a good friend and met him when they were in the U-21 national team. Due to his age, Ødegaard was absent from the computer game Football Manager 2015 until his father gave permission to use his son's likeness.

Ødegaard grew up in a Christian family and has expressed that religious faith is an important part of his life. He was named in Time's 30 most influential teenagers of 2015. The Norwegian's media training is frequently complimented, with one Norwegian journalist saying in 2022: "He was so well spoken — almost like he was media trained at home." He has an older brother and two younger sisters. Ødegaard is in a relationship with the Norwegian dancer Helene Spilling. In November 2024, it was announced that they got married. The formal wedding ceremony took place on 21 June 2025. Their first child, a son, was born on 1 December 2024. In addition to his native Norwegian, Ødegaard speaks English, Spanish, and some Dutch.

== Career statistics ==
=== Club ===
As of match played 7 November 2026

Appearances and goals by club, season and competition
Club	Season	League			National cup (Note: Includes Norwegian Cup, Copa del Rey, KNVB Cup, FA Cup)		League cup (Note: Includes EFL Cup)		Europe		Other		Total	
Club	Season	Division	Apps	Goals	Apps	Goals	Apps	Goals	Apps	Goals	Apps	Goals	Apps	Goals
Strømsgodset 3	2013	Norwegian Fourth Division	11	4	—		—		—		—		11	4
Strømsgodset 2	2013	Norwegian Second Division	2	0	—		—		—		—		2	0
Strømsgodset 2	2014	Norwegian Second Division	3	1	—		—		—		—		3	1
Strømsgodset 2	Total		5	1	—		—		—		—		5	1
Strømsgodset	2014	Tippeligaen	23	5	1	0	—		1 (Note: Appearance(s) in UEFA Champions League)	0	—		25	5
Real Madrid Castilla	2014–15	Segunda División B	11	1	—		—		—		—		11	1
Real Madrid Castilla	2015–16	Segunda División B	34	1	—		—		—		4 (Note: Appearances in Segunda División B play-offs)	0	38	1
Real Madrid Castilla	2016–17	Segunda División B	13	3	—		—		—		—		13	3
Real Madrid Castilla	Total		58	5	—		—		—		4	0	62	5
Real Madrid	2014–15	La Liga	1	0	0	0	—		0	0	0	0	1	0
Real Madrid	2016–17	La Liga	0	0	1	0	—		0	0	0	0	1	0
Real Madrid	2020–21	La Liga	7	0	0	0	—		2	0	0	0	9	0
Real Madrid	Total		8	0	1	0	—		2	0	0	0	11	0
Heerenveen (loan)	2016–17	Eredivisie	14	0	1	0	—		—		2 (Note: Appearances in Eredivisie European play-offs)	1	17	1
Heerenveen (loan)	2017–18	Eredivisie	24	2	2	0	—		—		0	0	26	2
Heerenveen (loan)	Total		38	2	3	0	—		—		2	1	43	3
Vitesse (loan)	2018–19	Eredivisie	31	8	4	2	—		—		4	1	39	11
Real Sociedad (loan)	2019–20	La Liga	31	4	5	3	—		—		—		36	7
Arsenal (loan)	2020–21	Premier League	14	1	—		—		6 (Note: Appearances in UEFA Europa League)	1	—		20	2
Arsenal	2021–22	Premier League	36	7	1	0	3	0	—		—		40	7
Arsenal	2022–23	Premier League	37	15	1	0	0	0	7	0	—		45	15
Arsenal	2023–24	Premier League	35	8	1	0	2	1	9	2	1 (Note: Appearance in FA Community Shield)	0	48	11
Arsenal	2024–25	Premier League	30	3	1	0	3	0	11	3	—		45	6
Arsenal	2025–26	Premier League	24	1	2	0	2	0	8	0	—		36	1
Arsenal	2026–27	Premier League	10	3	0	0	2	0	4	1	1	1	17	5
Arsenal	Arsenal total		186	38	6	0	12	1	45	7	2	1	251	47
Career total			391	67	20	5	12	1	48	7	12	3	483	83

=== International ===
As of match played 17 November 2026

Appearances and goals by national team and year
National team	Year	Apps	Goals
Norway	2014	3	0
Norway	2015	5	0
Norway	2016	1	0
Norway	2017	1	0
Norway	2018	4	0
Norway	2019	8	1
Norway	2020	3	0
Norway	2021	12	0
Norway	2022	10	1
Norway	2023	8	1
Norway	2024	6	0
Norway	2025	6	1
Norway	2026	12	2
Total		79	6

As of match played 17 November 2026
Scores and results list Norway's goal tally first, score column indicates score after each Ødegaard goal.

List of international goals scored by Martin Ødegaard
No.	Date	Venue	Cap	Opponent	Score	Result	Competition	Ref.
1	7 June 2019	Ullevaal Stadion, Oslo, Norway	17	Romania	2–0	2–2	UEFA Euro 2020 qualifying	
2	25 March 2022	Ullevaal Stadion, Oslo, Norway	38	Slovakia	2–0	2–0	Friendly	
3	12 September 2023	Ullevaal Stadion, Oslo, Norway	53	Georgia	2–0	2–1	UEFA Euro 2024 qualifying	
4	9 September 2025	Ullevaal Stadion, Oslo, Norway	67	Moldova	5–0	11–1	2026 FIFA World Cup qualification	
5	7 June 2026	Sports Illustrated Stadium, Harrison, United States	68	Morocco	1–1	1–1	Friendly	
6	17 November 2026	Parken Stadium, Copenhagen, Denmark	79	Denmark	2–2	3–2	2026–27 UEFA Nations League A	

== Honours ==
Real Sociedad

- Copa del Rey: 2019–20

Arsenal

- Premier League: 2025–26
- FA Community Shield: 2023, 2026
- UEFA Champions League runner-up: 2025–26

Individual

- Gullballen: 2019
- Kniksen's Honour Award: 2022
- Tippeligaen Young Player of the Year: 2014
- Idrettsgallaen Breakthrough of the Year: 2014
- Eredivisie Team of the Year: 2018–19
- Vitesse Player of the Year: 2018–19
- UEFA La Liga Revelation Team of the Year: 2019–20
- Arsenal Player of the Season: 2022–23, 2023–24
- Premier League Player of the Month: November/December 2022
- La Liga Player of the Month: September 2019
- Eredivisie Player of the Month: April 2019
- Eredivisie Talent of the Month: May 2019
- London Football Awards Premier League Player of the Year: 2023
- PFA Team of the Year: 2022–23 Premier League, 2023–24 Premier League
- ESM Team of the Year: 2022–23
- Ballon d’Or nominee: 2023, 2024
