= Piccolo (surname) =

Piccolo is an Italian surname. Notable people with the surname include:

- Alessandro Piccolo (agricultural scientist) (born 1951), Italian chemist and agricultural scientist
- Alessandro Piccolo (racing driver) (born 1980), Italian racing driver
- Antonio Piccolo (born 1988), Italian footballer
- Antonio Piccolo (footballer, born 1990), Italian footballer
- Brian Piccolo (1943–1970), American National Football League player
- Donato Piccolo (born 1976), Italian artist
- Felice Piccolo (born 1983), Italian footballer
- Francesco Piccolo (born 1964), Italian writer and screenwriter
- Francisco María Piccolo (1654–1729), Sicilian Jesuit missionary in Mexico
- Frank Piccolo (1921-1981), American mobster
- María Jimena Piccolo (born 1985), Argentine actress
- Michele Piccolo (born 1985), Italian footballer
- Ottavia Piccolo (born 1949), Italian theatre and film actress
- Renato Piccolo (born 1962), Italian former cyclist
- Rina Piccolo, Canadian cartoonist
- Rino Piccolo, international film producer and film commissioner
- Sol Piccolo (born 1996), Argentine female volleyball player
- Tony Piccolo (born 1960), Australian politician

== See also ==
- Joseph LoPiccolo (disambiguation)
- Salvatore Lo Piccolo (born 1942), Sicilian mafioso
