= Mercy Hospital (St. Petersburg, Florida) =

Coordinates: 27.7571°N 82.6629°W

Geography
- Location: 1344 22nd Street South, St. Petersburg, Florida, United States

Organization
- Type: General hospital (African American)

History
- Constructed: 1910
- Opened: 1923
- Closed: 1966

Links
- Lists: Hospitals in Florida

Mercy Hospital was a hospital located in St. Petersburg, Florida. The hospital was the only primary care facility for the African-American community of St. Petersburg from 1923 to 1966. It was designed by the local architect Henry Taylor, which has also designed other important structures such as the City Comfort Station, the Vinoy Park Hotel and the Jungle Country Club Hotel. It was constructed by Edgar Weeks in July 1923. Mercy Hospital not only served as a medical facility but also as a site for protesting against the segregation of the other hospitals in the city during the Civil Rights Movement. In 1994, it was declared a Historic Place. The city purchased the facility in 1998 due to a lack of redevelopment and deterioration.*change site Then the city leased the facility to Community Health Centers of Pinellas, Inc., which also runs the Johnnie Ruth Clarke Medical Center.

== History ==
=== Construction ===
Before Mercy Hospital, African-Americans relied on a small health care facility named the Good Samaritan. The building was built in 1910 on 6th Avenue South and 7th Street with the purpose to provide health care to whites only. However, it was moved in 1913 to 4th Avenue South and 12th Street to serve blacks only this time, making it the first hospital to serve African-American residents in this community. The health care facility only had five rooms, a few beds and minimal care.

It was replaced in 1923 by Mercy Hospital as a result of the growing African-American community in St. Petersburg, Florida. Mercy Hospital was created by the architect Henry Taylor who designed it and the contractor Edgar Weeks who built it. The walls of the new hospital were made of stucco over hollow terra-cotta tile. It had projecting eaves with decorative wooden brackets. The hospital had about sixteen to twenty beds. The state refused to help the financial problems that the hospital faced, and therefore could not afford any more beds. It was not until 1926 that Mercy Hospital gained their first physician, Dr. James Maxie Ponder. Up until then, Mercy Hospital had been run by nurses only.

=== Operation ===
Mercy Hospital was often short staffed and did not have the necessary equipment to offer service to the black community. Nonetheless, Mercy Hospital was a family and everyone gave maximum effort while doing their job. Service was their motto and so they offered compassionate and quality health care to the community's African-Americans. Housekeepers kept the hospital clean to avoid the spread of diseases. The pharmacist ordered medications the hospital needed and made sure they were properly prepared. The kitchen staff made sure the meals were warm and ready for patients. Volunteers worked without pay, assisting by greeting visitors, keeping patients company, answering phones, as well as many other tasks.

During the mid-1940s Mercy Hospital did not meet the standards of other (white) hospitals. In 1959 alone, Mercy admitted around 2,764 patients and performed more than 480 surgeries, but still it was not enough. The white hospitals were always larger, counted with more funds for staff and had better medical equipment. In 1948, thanks to Dr. Timberlake's remarks about how pitiful the facility was, a 15,000-foot addition that cost about $212,742 was built for Mercy, which added more space for beds, now totaling fifty-five. Obviously, this was not enough to efficiently treat the African-American population of St. Petersburg at that time. Despite Dr. Edward Cole's remarks of the hospital having no pharmacy, poor laboratories, inefficient x-ray equipment, no room for the recovery of patients, and no physical therapy service to a newspaper, the city council refuted the proposed $1.7 million addition to it in 1960. It was not until blacks got tired of the "separate but equal" doctrine when the city wanted to build an additional wing for black patients at Mound Park that Mercy Hospital was integrated. Mrs. Altamease Chapman was the first black to be allowed in and treated in Mound Park on February 26, 1961 by Dr. Fred Alsup. However, she was sent to the last available room in the surgery section to be operated on from phlebitis in her left leg. Then, in 1962 Mercy Hospital experienced an $865,000 expansion. This addition added three one-floor wings, more beds totaling seventy-eight now, obstetric and surgery departments, two operating rooms, one recovery room and a very large pediatric department 9.

=== Influential staff ===
Primary doctors of the hospital included: Dr. James Ponder, Dr. Breaux Martin, Dr. Fred W. Alsup, Dr. Ralph M. Wimbish, Dr. Orion T. Ayer, Sr., Dr. Harry F. Taliaferro, and Dr. Eugene C. Rose. They treated illnesses and accident victims, delivered babies, fixed broken bones, listened to the problems of their patients and gave them caring advice.

In 1926 Dr. James Maxie Ponder was employed by Mercy Hospital as the first African-American doctor in the community. Dr. Ponder was born in 1888. He moved to St. Petersburg with his wife Phannye Ayer Ponder from Ocala, Florida in 1924. He was a veteran from the Medical Corps World War I and Mrs. Ponder was a well-known civic leader and a social studies teacher at Gibbs High School. Dr. Ponder would be a very busy full-time physician there, handling from everyday routines to emergency cases such as childbirth. His office, namely Sugar Hill, was on 5th Avenue South. He was also the first African-American physician to be an active member of the Pinellas County Medical Society. He served the city and Mercy as a physician for 26 years until his retirement in 1951. He died in 1958 "after crusading for better medical care for African-Americans". He is remembered today as a true servant of God and Man.

Dr. Fred W. Alsup came to live in the city of St. Petersburg in 1950. He was an activist in the Civil Rights Movement, fighting segregation and prejudice in cases such as: Alsup vs. The City of St. Petersburg (the battle, which lasted 4 years, gave blacks the right to enjoy city-owned beaches), and Wimbish and Alsup et al vs. Pinellas County Commissioners and Airco Golf Corporation (this battle gave blacks the right to participate in county-owned golf courses). In addition, Dr. Alsup marched in the streets fighting for the integration of businesses in the city. In the 1960s, he bailed out black students from jail during a student demonstration they organized. He was also the first black physician to be a member of the Pinellas County Medical Society and the first to be selected as part of the staff of St. Anthony's Hospital. He practiced in St. Petersburg for more than 50 years until September 2001. He died, 88 years old, in April 2002.

Dr. Ralph M. Wimbish served as a physician in St. Petersburg from 1952 until his death in 1967. He was a leader in the Civil Rights Movement and president of St. Petersburg's branch of the NAACP. He was also the founder of the most influential group in St. Petersburg during the beginning of the civil rights movement, called the Ambassadors Club. He founded the club in 1953 after getting inspired to "wake up and do something to help our community", as he was forced by the city to put his swimming pool in his front yard because otherwise it would have been near the north side of 15th Avenue South, which at the time was what divided blacks from whites residential areas. Members of the club included: Dr. Orion Ayer Sr., Dr. Robert J. Swain, Dr. Fred Alsup, Samuel Blossom, Sidney Campbell, George Grogan, John Hopkins, Ernest Ponder and Emanuel Stewart. Since then, the organization rapidly came to be a "civic and service club of distinction with the purpose of improving cultural, economic, educational and living conditions primarily in the African American community. In 1954, it made possible for African-American floats to be included in the city's annual showcase parade. In the same year, the organization honored Jennie L. Hall, a white woman who donated $25,000 for the construction of a swimming pool on 22nd Street, which is still used today by the community. Dr. Wimbish with the help and influence of the Ambassadors Club, integrated the swimming spot named Spa Beach and Howard Johnson's lunch counter on U.S Highway 19. In 1969, C. Bette Wimbish, his lifetime wife and now widow, became the first black person to be on the St. Petersburg City Council.

Dr. Orion T. Ayer, Sr. was a physician in St. Petersburg from 1949 to 1984. He was elected in 1964 as Chief of the Division of General Practice at Mercy and Mound Park Hospital.

Dr. Breaux Martin was part of the Mercy family for nine years. He was one of the only two black physicians in the community. In 1949 he moved to Ohio to look for more opportunities.

Dr. Harry F. Taliaferro became part of the Mercy family in the mid-1950s. He was an activist of civil rights and passionate tennis player. He fought very hard to integrate local tennis courts. His patients and friends called him "Dr. T." or "Tally". He was a graduate of Howard University School of Medicine. He practiced for more than 35 years.

Dr. Eugene C. Rose started his medical practice in St. Petersburg in 1953. He served the African-American community for 29 years. He was an associate trustee of Bethune-Cookman College and the recipient on the Mary McLeod Bethune Medallion for his outstanding accomplishments in 1961.

Other Mercy staff included some white doctors such as Drs. Johnny Clark, Benjamin L. Jones, Robert J. Swain, Robert Landstra, Royce Hobby, Alan Campbell, John Thompson, and Frank Fazio. Some whites indeed helped Mercy Hospital and the community overall For instance, doctors would come over and treat black patients who were not permitted to enter their offices. Dr. Gideon Timberlake was one of these doctors. Mound Hospital also would send them surgical instruments, and they helped them get their own sterilizer. A black woman named Minnie C. Rogers was the administrator at Mercy Hospital.

Some of the most influential nurses included: Mary Brayboy Jones (1946-mid 1960s), Sadie Henry, Hanna Singleton, Yvonne Taylor, Annie Sue Martin Brinson and Dolores Gordon. Registered nurses, licensed practical nurses and aides or nursing assistants were essential at Mercy. The doctors and nurses of Mercy Hospital worked as a team to the point that, as nurses describes their duties; they said that until the doctor arrived, the emergency room nurse was the doctor. Many of the RNs received training from Grady Memorial Hospital School of Nursing in Atlanta while others received their nursing degrees from Howard University, Florida A&M, Tuskegee Institute, and Columbia Hospital. Many LPNs studied in the vocational program at the all-black Gibbs High School and then came to Mercy seeking firsthand experience. As nurse Mary Brayboy Jones described, Friday and Saturday nights were always pretty stressing and busy at Mercy, as they would get cut and shot people due to the weekend partying going on. She also stated how she was paid ninety dollars less than what white nurses were paid at Mound Hospital, the white's hospital.

=== Closure ===
The hospital had difficulty covering its monthly operating costs since its opening in 1926. The hospital relied on payments that totaled anywhere from $3 to $15. This is much less than the typical $30 per day that a patient usually pays for hospital treatment.

Due to the insufficient payments from patients as well as inadequate health insurance, Mercy Hospital had financial difficulties from the beginning. Along with the lack of full payments from patients, Mercy Hospital also was forced to deal with the revolutionizing technological advances for better patient care. The low payments from patients, as well as low funding from outside sources, made it very difficult for Mercy Hospital to keep up to date with their technology as well as their construction. Mercy Hospital could not afford to keep a high staff or proper instruments to do daily tests for patients. This increased the wait time for medical results. There were also a shortage of beds inside the hospital so the patient turn-around time also increased, making it more difficult to get through a lot of patients in a single day. The low funding and lack of employees led to multiple extensive problems that piled on top of each other. The hospital struggled with these issues for so long that it turned into a financial crisis.

Unfortunately, in 1965, the hospital was denied accreditation when a baby was burned due to a defective incubator. The hospital closed on April 1, 1966 due to its inadequacies and also due to increases in deficits of more than $300,000 and to the fact that two separate hospitals owned by the city was not cost-effective. During the next years, the city tried to sell the property but failed. In the 1970s, it served as a temporary office space providing food and shelter to poor people. In 1973, it was used by the Goodwill Company as an office for a drug and alcohol rehabilitation program. In 1982, it was sold to a private developer, which renovated it in 1984 but only to be closed again in 1986 due to asbestos contamination.

=== Renovation ===
After closing its doors in 1966, doctors and patients were transferred to Mound Park Hospital. The transition was not easy for the city of St. Petersburg. Mound Park started accepting black patients in 1964, but the black community still preferred Mercy Hospital because it was in the center of their community and was what they were comfortable with. In 1998, the facility was purchased back by the city due to a lack of redevelopment and more and more deterioration for $142,000. It was later leased to Community Health Centers of Pinellas, Inc. Renovations were made to Mercy Hospital and in 2004, the Johnnie Ruth Clarke Health Center was added to the site and patients still actively seek medical help there today.

== Johnnie Ruth Clarke Health Center ==
The Johnnie Ruth Clarke Health Center was constructed on the site of Mercy Hospital as African-Americans required a top health care facility. Prior to construction, medical care was provided to Mercy Hospital patients at Community Health Centers of Pinellas' facility located at 1310 22nd Street Avenue South. This health center first opened in 1985 to provide help to the Mercy patients left without medical. The health center had exam rooms, offices, counseling centers and a lab room. It offered medical treatment as well as spiritual and emotional counseling. The hospital was named as so, to honor Dr. Johnnie Ruth Clarke, of St. Petersburg. She was the first African-American woman to receive a doctorate degree from University of Florida. She's remembered today as a distinguished educator, civil rights activist, and the leader in the fight against sickle cell anemia.

The new, state-of-the-art health center was built to serve the great need for quality healthcare. The new health center, which began construction on February 1, 2003, was built alongside and connected to the Historic Mercy Hospital. On February 2, 2004, the newly constructed hospital, named Johnnie Ruth Clarke Health Center, in honor of Dr. Johnnie Ruth Clarke, started admitting patients of all backgrounds. This 26,000-square-foot (2,400 m^{2}) facility does not have hospital beds, but it gives medical services to poor people and those who have been medically underserved. It provides prenatal, obstetrical, pediatric, and dental care as well as services in internal medicine, family planning and behavioral medicine.

== See also ==
- Racial segregation in the United States
