= Joseph LoPiccolo =

Joseph LoPiccolo may refer to:

- Joseph LoPiccolo (organized crime) (1918–1999), American Gambino crime family member
- Joseph LoPiccolo (psychology) (born 1943), American psychologist
