= Lull =

Lull may refer to:

== Economy ==
- recession

== Music ==
- Lull (band), a musical project by Mick Harris.
- Lull (EP), an EP by the Smashing Pumpkins
- "Lull", a song by Radiohead, a B-side to "Karma Police"
- Auburn Lull, an American dream pop / space rock group

== People ==
- Saint Lullus (c.710–786), English bishop, also referred to as Lull or Lul
- Barbara Lull (1905–1978), American violinist
- Edward P. Lull, Commander of Alaska, USA, in 1881
- Richard Swann Lull (1867–1957), American palaeontologist
- Timothy Lull (1943–2003), American Lutheran minister and scholar
- Ramon Llull, philosopher
- Arthur de Lull (or de Lulli), pseudonym of Euphemia Allen

== Other uses ==
- Lull, a brand of reach forklift built by JLG Industries
