= Red Armstrong (American football) =

American football and basketball player and coach (1903–1978)

Biographical details
- Born: 1903
- Died: May 7, 1978 (aged 75); Newark, Ohio, U.S.

Playing career

Football
- 1923–1926: Wittenberg

Basketball
- 1923–1927: Wittenberg

Coaching career (HC unless noted)

Football
- 1929–1941: McClain HS (OH)
- 1942–1944: Denison

Basketball
- 1943–1944: Denison

Head coaching record
- Overall: 12–3–2 (college football); 18–2 (college basketball); 65–29–8 (high school football)

Gerald D. "Red" Armstrong (1903 – May 7, 1978) was an American football and basketball player and coach. He served as the head football coach at Denison University in Granville, Ohio from 1942 to 1944, compiling a record of 12–3–2. Denison did not field a football team in 1943. Armstrong was also the head basketball coach at Denison during the 1943–44 season, tallying a mark of 18–2. In 1944, he resigned from coaching to enter into private business in Newark, Ohio. He died at Licking Memorial Hospital, in Newark, on May 7, 1978.

== Head coaching record ==
=== College football ===
Year	Team	Overall	Conference	Standing	Bowl/playoffs
Denison Big Red (Ohio Athletic Conference) (1942–1944)
1942	Denison	6–2–1	5–1–1	T–5th	
1943	No team—World War II				
1944	Denison	6–1–1			
Denison:		12–3–2	5–1–1		
Total:		12–3–2			
