= James Maxie Ponder =

American physician

- Born: February 22, 1888; Jacksonville, Florida
- Died: March 4, 1958 (aged 70); Bay Pines, Florida
- Occupation: Physician
- Years active: 1915–1951
- Known for: First Black physician in St. Petersburg, Florida
- Spouse: Fanny (née Ayer) Ponder (1917–1958)
- Children: Ernest Ponder (1918–1998), Florine

James Maxie Ponder (February 22, 1888 – March 4, 1958) was a physician and the first African-American admitted to practice at Mercy Hospital in St. Petersburg, Florida. He was regarded as an influential leader of the African American community in St. Petersburg. For his service in the US Army Medical Reserve Corps during World War I, Ponder received a Presidential Citation.

== Early life ==
Ponder was born in Jacksonville, Florida, to William and Addie (née Williams) Ponder. He graduated from Howard Academy in Ocala and after attended Benedict College in Columbia, South Carolina. In 1915, he graduated from Meharry Medical College in Nashville, Tennessee.

== Career ==
After graduating from medical school, Ponder started a practice out of his house in Ocala. The kitchen was used as an emergency operating room. Ernest Ponder recalls victims of accidents and gunfights would appear at their home all hours of the night, and his father would care for their wounds. Payment frequently came in the form of poultry, vegetables, and ham.

In 1917, Ponder served in the Army Medical Reserve Corps. He was First Lieutenant in the 368th Infantry of the 92nd Infantry Division. Many of the soldiers he cared for suffered injuries from gassings. His unit saw action in the Vosges Mountains, the Meuse-Argonne Offensive, and near Metz. Ponder received a Presidential Citation for "meritorious service in the field of epidemic medicine." This experience would give him a background in handling the smallpox epidemic in St. Petersburg in the late 1920s. He was honorably discharged on March 7, 1919.

Following his service in World War I, Ponder returned to his home practice in Ocala. In 1924, he moved the family to St. Petersburg, Florida. It was here he was appointed assistant city physician. Ponder set up office in two rooms of a black-owned building, the Royal Express Bus Line. His practice was popular with thousands of African Americans who traveled to St. Petersburg to see him.

In 1926, Ponder was appointed city physician for the underprivileged and African American community.

He was the first African American admitted to practice at Mercy Hospital in St. Petersburg. He was responsible for the creation of Mercy's prenatal hospital wing, which served African Americans.

As an influential leader of the African American community in St. Petersburg, Ponder held various leadership positions. He was the chairman of the Trustees for Black Schools in Pinellas County. His duty was to help improve black schools. Ponder was also the first African American to be elected as an active member of the Pinellas County Medical Society; as well as the first African American in Southern States to be given extended membership in the National Council of World War Veterans. Ponder was chosen as state commander, and he was in charge of bringing African American veterans together in Florida. Ponder retired in 1951.

== Death ==
Ponder died on March 4, 1958, at Veterans Administration Hospital in Bay Pines, Florida. The cause of death was a heart attack. During his funeral, the flag at city hall was flown at half staff. A bronze plaque erected in his memory can be found in Bayfront Medical Center. He was survived by his widow, son, daughter, and three grandchildren.

== Personal life ==
In 1917, Ponder married Fanny Ayer, a teacher. Their son Ernest was born on April 3, 1918. A graduate of Morehouse College, Ernest took over teaching duties for his mother's class at Gibbs High School when she was no longer able to teach due to poor health. James and Fanny adopted a girl named Florine sometime during the 1920s.
