= Bert Lock =

English cricketer (1903-1978)

Personal information
- Full name: Herbert Christmas Lock
- Born: 8 May 1903; East Molesey, Surrey, England
- Died: 19 May 1978 (aged 75); Honor Oak, London, England
- Batting: Right-handed
- Bowling: Right-arm medium

Domestic team information
- Years: Team
- 1934–1939: Devon
- 1931–1935: Minor Counties
- 1926–1932: Surrey

Career statistics
Competition	First-class
Matches	35
Runs scored	93
Batting average	4.22
100s/50s	–/–
Top score	20*
Balls bowled	6,407
Wickets	81
Bowling average	32.81
5 wickets in innings	–
10 wickets in match	–
Best bowling	4/34
Catches/stumpings	10/–
- Source: Cricinfo, 18 April 2011

Herbert 'Bert' Christmas Lock (8 May 1903 – 19 May 1978) was an English cricketer and prominent groundsman. Lock was a right-handed batsman who bowled right-arm medium pace. He was born in East Molesey, Surrey.

== Playing career ==
Lock made his first-class debut for Surrey in the 1926 County Championship against Glamorgan. He played first-class cricket for Surrey from 1926 to 1932, making 32 infrequent appearances. A tailend batsman, Lock scored 89 runs for Surrey in first-class cricket at a batting average of just 4.23. His position within the team was that of a bowler. He took 75 wickets for Surrey at a bowling average of 31.74, although he never took a five wicket haul, with his best figures being 4/34. His best innings bowling figures came against Leicestershire in 1928.

Lock played a handful of first-class matches for other teams besides Surrey. He toured the West Indies with Baron Tennyson's XI in 1927, playing just a single first-class match against Jamaica. He took just a single wicket in the match, that of Charles Morales for the cost of 118 runs. While playing for Surrey, he represented the Second XI in the Minor Counties Championship, which entitled him to represent the Minor Counties cricket team in a first-class match against the touring New Zealanders in 1931. He took 4 New Zealand wickets in their first-innings, those of John Mills, Cyril Allcott, Ken James and Jack Kerr.

Lock joined Devon in 1934, making his debut for the county in the Minor Counties Championship against the Kent Second XI. He continued to play Minor counties cricket for Devon until 1939. While playing for Devon, Somerset and Gloucestershire offered him terms, but Lock joined neither. While playing for Devon he played his second and final first-class match for the Minor Counties against Oxford University. While still a player, Lock stood as an umpire in a single first-class match in 1928 between the Army and the Royal Air Force.

== Groundsman and later life ==
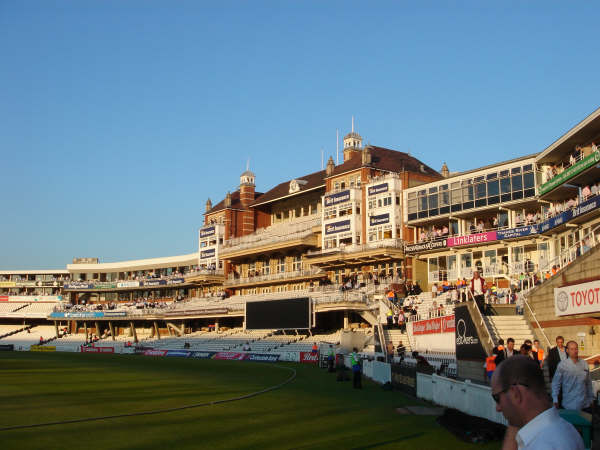
The Oval, which Lock famously prepared in time for the 1946 season following six years of military use

Lock's career as a groundsman began in 1922 when he was on the ground staff for the Royal Military College, Sandhurst. He joined the Surrey ground staff in the same year, an association which lasted until 1932 when he joined Devon, becoming their head groundsman at the County Ground, Exeter. The war brought a break in his career as a groundsman, as he served in the Royal Air Force. In May 1942 a Luftwaffe bomb hit his home, killing a guest staying there and several neighbours. Demobilised in 1945, he returned to The Oval.

During the course of the war The Oval was used by the military. Originally prepared as a prisoner of war camp, instead it was used for anti-aircraft guns, barrage balloons, searchlights and an Army assault course. As a result, the outfield was littered with barbed wire, pits, cement posts and over 900 wooden posts. Lock started repairing the ground in October 1945, in order to get it ready for the start of the 1946 season in April. Lock and his small staff levelled the playing field and laid some 45,000 pieces of turf, working from dawn until dusk. They successfully achieved their aim and the ground was ready for start of the 1946 season.

Lock continued as Surrey's head groundsman until 1965, seven years after Surrey had been county champions for seven straight seasons. He had to give up being a groundsman due to an arthritic hip, which required an operation. He was soon after employed as a sports consultant with Berk Chemicals. He later became the Official Inspector of Pitches for the Test and County Cricket Board. Outside of his work as a groundsman, he ran a course at the University of Wales, Aberystwyth. Lock was intending to go into business as a sports turf consultant, but died in Honor Oak, London, on 19 May 1978.
