= Tormod Kjellsen =

Norwegian footballer (1894–1978)

Tormod Kjellsen (25 September 1894 – 27 May 1978) was a Norwegian footballer from Larvik. He played for his local club Larvik Turn.

He made his debut for the Norway national team on 11 September 1910 in a 4–0 defeat to Sweden in Kristiania (now Oslo). He was the only player in the Norwegian squad to be at a team from outside the capital. His only other international cap was on 14 September 1913 in a 1–1 friendly draw against Russia in Moscow.

Kjellsen was aged 15 years and 351 days on his international debut. He held the record as the youngest full Norwegian international for over a century until it was broken by Martin Ødegaard on 27 August 2014.
