= Winarti Partaningrat =

Indonesian government official and librarian (1922–1978)

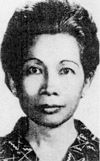
- Born: September 21, 1922; Java, Indonesia
- Died: May 8, 1978 (aged 55); Java, Indonesia
- Education: Columbia University
- Occupations: librarian, government official

Winarti Partaningrat (September 21, 1922 – May 8, 1978) was an early contributor to Indonesian librarianship, particularly the establishment of special libraries among government agencies.

== Education and government career ==
After receiving a medical degree in Indonesia, Partaningrat attended Columbia University where she received a master's degree in library science in 1958. From 1946 to 1951, she worked at the Foreign Broadcasting of Radio Republik Indonesia (possibly at the Voice of Free Indonesia), followed by seven years with the Voice of America for United Nations Radio. She served as the Head of the Bureau of Documentation for the Council of Sciences of Indonesia and the Indonesian Institute of Sciences.

=== National Network System of Library Documentation and Information Systems ===
Partaningrat was a leader in the creation of a special library networking system to allow information sharing among government departments. The organization also laid the foundations of library science within the fields of science, technology, biology, agriculture, medicine and humanities. By connecting these specialized libraries and implementing standardized practices, special libraries became pivotal in providing technical function and services within Indonesia.

== Selected publications ==
- 1961 Scientific Information Facilities in Indonesia
- 1966 Characteristics and History of Indonesian Scientific Periodicals
- 1978 Masterlist of Southeast Asian Microforms
