= Jonas Vabalas =

Captain Jonas Vabalas
- Born: 28 October 1908; Daugėlaičiai, Russian Empire
- Died: 13 May 1978 (aged 69); Vilnius, Lithuanian SSR
- Burial place: Sudervė Cemetery in Vilnius
- Alma mater: War School of Kaunas
- Military career
- Allegiance: Lithuania
- Service years: 1930–1940
- Rank: Captain
- Unit: 5th Infantry Regiment
- Awards: Lithuanian Independence Medal (1928)

Jonas Vabalas (28 October 1908 – 13 May 1978) was a Lithuanian military officer and sportsperson. An accomplished officer, Vabalas was nineteen times champion in Lithuanian sports competitions, including those of athletics, pentathlon, basketball, football, shooting, and fencing. Vabalas was the winner of a fencing championship organized by Belgian military officers in Brussels in 1937.

== Biography ==
=== Early life and education ===
Jonas Vabalas was born on 28 October 1908 in the village of Daugėlaičiai (modern-day Vilkaviškis District), then the Russian Empire. An active sportsperson from his youth, he attended primary school in Kybartai, graduating from its commercial school after which he enrolled in the War School of Kaunas in 1927. A recipient of the 1928 Lithuanian Independence Medal, Vabalas graduated in 1930 with the rank of lieutenant.

=== Military and sport career ===
He was appointed junior officer of the 9th company of the 5th Infantry Regiment. In 1931, as per a new ranking law, Vabalas was made junior lieutenant and transferred to the Press and Education Department of the army headquarters. After receiving a stipend from the Ministry of Defense in 1937, Vabalas studied at the Royal Military Institute of Physical Education in Belgium. While studying, he won first place in an officers' sabre fencing competition, and was awarded a medal of the Belgian army. Vabalas was also an accomplished épée fencer. During the two years spent in Belgium, Vabalas won and brought a total of two cups and sixteen medals to Lithuania.

After returning to Lithuania he lectured at the War School of Kaunas and was appointed to the army headquarters as a physical training instructor. At the Physical Culture Palace, Vabalas taught fencing. He was later transferred to the Military Sanitary Board. In 1938 he was promoted to captain. Vabalas hosted an olympiad for Lithuanians worldwide in Kaunas in 1938. For a brief period of time Vabalas hosted rhythmic exercises at the Kaunas radiophone. Vabalas also contributed to magazines such as Karys and Kardas, and to progenitor of the Lithuanian Encyclopedia. He was the author of Fizinis auklėjimas (1940), a physical exercise textbook.

=== Soviet Gulag ===
After the Soviet occupation of Lithuania in 1940, during the liquidation of the Lithuanian army, Vabalas was appointed as physical training instructor of the headquarters of the 179th Rifle Division of the 29th Rifle Territorial Corps of the Red Army. Vabalas shortly after became a staff member of the Lithuanian Activist Front, however in 1941 he was arrested and deported to Siberia, being firstly imprisoned in an NKVD prison. In Nizhny Novgorod (then known as Gorky), he was sentenced to 10 years of imprisonment. In 1942, Vabalas was transferred to the Butyrka prison in Moscow, where he spent three years. In 1945 he was again transferred to the Intalag, and later the Minlag forced labor camps.

From 1950, Vabalas resided in Krasnoyarsk Krai. He was released from the Soviet detention in 1956 and rehabilitated by the Military Collegium of the Supreme Court of the Soviet Union in 1964. The following year, he returned to Lithuania and lived in Vilnius working as a physical education trainer and chairman of the judges panel of the Lithuanian Athletics Federation.

Vabalas died on 13 May 1978. He was buried in Sudervė Cemetery in Vilnius.

== Sport achievements ==
Vabalas was a Lithuanian champion 19 times:

- 110 metres hurdles (1939)
- 4 × 100 metres relay (1929, 1931, 1937)
- 400 + 300 + 200 + 100 metres relay (1930)
- pole vault (1930–1932, 1935, 1937, 1939)
- pentathlon (1931)
- long jump (1933)
- high jump (1935, 1937)
- basketball (1933 with Lithuanian Gymnastics and Sports Federation (LGSF) team)
- soccer (1934 with FK Maistas Kaunas)
- team sports shooting (twice in 1935)
