= Lou Frost (footballer) =

Australian rules footballer

Personal information
- Full name: Lou Frost
- Born: 24 January 1917
- Died: 28 May 1978 (aged 61)
- Original team: City (Launceston)
- Height: 182 cm (6 ft 0 in)
- Weight: 84 kg (185 lb)

Playing career^{1}
Years	Club	Games (Goals)
1944	South Melbourne	6 (0)
- ^{1} Playing statistics correct to the end of 1944.

Lou Frost (24 January 1917 – 28 May 1978) was an Australian rules footballer who played with South Melbourne in the Victorian Football League (VFL).
