= Johnnie Ruth Clarke =

American activist (1919–1978)

- Born: Johnnie Ruth Clarke; June 28, 1919; St. Petersburg, Florida, US
- Died: May 15, 1978 (aged 58)
- Education: Florida A&M University, University of Florida
- Occupation: Educator
- Spouse: Johnny L. Clarke
- Children: 5

Johnnie Ruth Clarke (July 28, 1919 – May 15, 1978) was an American activist, teacher and humanitarian. She participated in many different societies, and is credited as the first African American to obtain a doctorate from the University of Florida's College of Education. She served as dean of Gibbs Junior College and as assistant dean of academic affairs at St. Petersburg Junior College, which offers a scholarship in her name. The Johnnie Ruth Clarke Health Center was also named after her.

== Early life and education ==
Johnnie Ruth Clarke was born on July 28, 1919. Her parents worked at the Sorento Hotel, her father as a head bellman and her mother as a head housekeeper.

Clarke received her bachelor's degree in Social Science from Florida A&M University, then went on to receive a master's degree from Fisk University. In 1966, Clarke obtained her doctorate from the University of Florida College of Education, becoming the first African American to obtain a doctorate from any Florida public university.

== Recognition ==
St. Petersburg College set up a scholarship in her name. The Johnnie Ruth Clarke Health Center was also named after her.

=== Johnnie Ruth Clarke Health Center (St. Petersburg, FL) ===
Originating from Mercy Hospital, now a historical landmark in St. Petersburg, the Johnnie Ruth Clarke (JRC) Health Center is located at 1344 22nd St. South, St. Petersburg, Florida. It officially opened in 2004 as a Federally Qualified Health Center. The Johnnie Ruth Clarke Health Center is historically known for its efforts in aiding segregated African American communities in St. Petersburg who could not afford medical attention or medical insurance. Now being one out of eleven nonprofit health centers associated with the Community Health Centers of Pinellas, the Johnnie Ruth Clarke Health Center was built around the original building of the Mercy Hospital, which was the first and only facility to deliver affordable health care for non-insured African American residents until 1966. Today, the original building of the Mercy Hospital and the Johnnie Ruth Clarke Health Center oversee between 130 and 150 patients daily with or without health insurance, attributed by the civil rights activist Dr. Johnnie Ruth Clarke and the Community Health Centers of Pinellas, Inc.

=== Johnnie Ruth Clarke Scholarship - St. Petersburg College ===
St. Petersburg College honors Dr. Johnnie Ruth Clarke's outstanding accomplishments by awarding the Johnnie Ruth Clarke Scholarship to students graduating from Pinellas County high schools. This scholarship aims to support underprivileged students who meet the eligibility requirements and will accommodate each recipient for two consecutive years attending St. Petersburg College. Throughout their collegiate years, each recipient will also be allowed to work with mentors from the Johnnie Ruth Clarke Chapter of the National Council on Black American Affairs (NCBAA).

=== The Florida State Sickle Cell Foundation ===
Clarke founded the Florida State Sickle Cell Foundation in 1972 while she was assistant director of the Florida Regional Medical Program. The foundation was intended to tackle all aspects of the problem of sickle-cell disease including raising awareness, treatment, and research.
