= Nataliia Lebedeva =

Russian ethnographer and anthropologist

Nataliia Ivanova Lebedeva (July 19, 1894 – May 19, 1978) was a Soviet ethnographer and anthropologist known for her studies of textiles in Russia, Ukraine, and Belarus. She was born and died in Ryazan. She was a pioneer in the study of material culture to show evidence of a people's development and history. She studied the weaving, spinning, typology, and buildings of Eastern Slavic peoples.
