= Alice Margaret Coats =

British artist

- Born: 15 June 1905; Handsworth, Birmingham, England
- Died: 19 May 1978 (aged 72); Bath, Somerset, England
- Education: Birmingham Central School of Art; Slade School of Fine Art; Andre Lhote's school, Paris
- Known for: Painting, book illustration

Alice Margaret Coats (15 June 1905 – 19 May 1978, in Bath) was a British watercolour painter, engraver, woodcut artist, and author. She was a member of the Central Club of Wood-Engravers in Colour. She is best known for botanical and horticultural works.

== Life ==
Alice Margaret Coats was born on 15 June 1905 in Handsworth, Birmingham, to a Scottish clergyman, the Rev. Robert Hay Coats, and his wife Margaret, who was from Glasgow. Coats was educated at Edgbaston High School before studying at the Birmingham Central School of Art between 1922 and 1928, at the Slade School of Fine Art in London and in Paris during the 1930s at Andre Lhote's school.

Coats produced book illustrations, flower paintings on silk, colour woodcuts, and landscape paintings in both oil and watercolours. Between 1933 and 1939 she was an organising secretary of the 'Birmingham Group' of artists and during World War II from 1940 to 1945 served in the Land Army helping to cultivate land on which Birmingham University housing was later built. In the 1950s, her artistic career was cut short by arthritis and since then she concentrated on her writings and the study of horticultural history. She wrote a series of scholarly articles and books on horticultural history and biography that were recognised by the Royal Horticultural Society and the University of Birmingham.

In 1965, Coats joined the newly founded Garden History Society and contributed articles to Garden History. Her first book Flowers and their History was published in 1956. Among her other works were Garden Shrubs and their Histories (1963), The Quest for Plants: a History of the Horticultural Explorers (1969), The Treasury of Flowers (1975), and Lord Bute (1975). Her book The Book of Flowers (1973) included woodcuts, engravings and watercolours.

== Exhibitions ==
- 1961 Kenya, Nairobi, Sorsbie Gallery
- 1961 India, Mumbai, Jehangir Nicholson Gallery
- 1960 Cyprus, Nicosia, British Council Office – Nicosia
- 1960 Pakistan, Lahore, Alhamra Art Gallery
- 1957 Spain, Gijon, Salon De Exposiciones Del Real Instituto Jovellanos
- 1957 Spain, Oviedo, Galeria De Exposiciones De La Obra Social Y Sultural
- 1957 Spain, Madrid, Ateneo De Madrid
- 1957 Spain, Salon De Exposiciones De La Sociedad De Amigos Del Arte
- 1957 Portugal, Lisbon, Palacio Foz
- 1957 Portugal, Porto, Escola Superior De Belas Artes Do Porto
- 1954 Ceylon, Colombo, Ceylon Art Gallery
- 1954 Switzerland, Fribourg, Musee d'art et d'histoire
- 1952 Germany, Berlin, Kunst Templehof
- 1950 Canada, Québec, Montreal Museum Of Fine Arts
- 1949 Austria, Alpbach, Summer School
- 1943 London, Ognisko Polskie (Polish Hearth) Belgrave Square
- 1943 London, Belgian Institute, Belgrave Square
- 1943 London, Czechoslovak Institute, Grosvenor Place
- 1943 London, Greek House, Grovesnor Square

== Collections ==
- Museum of New Zealand Te Papa Tongarewa, Wellington
- Government Art Collection, London
- Birmingham Museum and Art Gallery
- British Council, London

== Publications ==
- Flowers and their Histories (1956; 2nd ed., 1968)
- Garden Shrubs and their Histories (1963)
- The Quest for Plants: a History of the Horticultural Explorers (1969)
- The Plant Hunters (1970)
- The Books of Flowers (1973)
- The Treasury of Flowers (1975)
- Lord Bute (1975)
