= Elinore Denniston =

American author

- Born: September 20, 1900; North Dakota
- Died: May 24, 1978 (aged 77); Phoenix, Arizona
- Other names: Dennis Allan; Rae Foley; Helen K. Maxwell
- Occupation: Writer

Elinore Denniston (September 20, 1900 – May 24, 1978) was an American writer of more than 40 mystery novels under the pseudonym Rae Foley She wrote other mysteries as Helen K. Maxwell and Dennis Allan. She also wrote books for children. In a brief comment in Twentieth Century Crime and Mystery Writers, author Herbert Harris describes her as "one of the most prolific and successful of America's 'romantic suspense' novelists...".

== Biography ==
Elinore Denniston was born on September 20, 1900, in North Dakota. She began writing under the pseudonym Dennis Allen in 1936. She worked as an assistant to the playwright Theresa Helburn. She also worked as an assistant to Eleanor Roosevelt. She died on May 24, 1978, in Phoenix, Arizona.

== Bibliography ==
=== Mystery novels ===
==== As Dennis Allan ====
- House of Treason (1936)
- Brandon Is Missing (1940)
- The Case of the Headless Corpse (1940)
- Born to Be Murdered (1952)
- Dead to Rights (1953)

==== As Rae Foley (some originally published as Elinore Denniston) ====
- No Tears for the Dead (1948)
- Girl from Nowhere (1949)
- Bones of Contention (1950). Republished as The Other Woman (1976)
- The Hundredth Door (1950)
- An Ape in Velvet (1951)
- Wake the Sleeping Wolf (1952). Republished as Don't Kill, My Love (1952)
- The Man in the Shadow (1953)
- Dark Intent (1954)
- Madness in the Spring (1954)
- Death and Mr. Potter (1955). Republished as The Peacock Is a Bird of Prey (1976)
- The Last Gamble (1956)
- Run for Your Life (1957)
- Where Is Mary Bostwick? (1958)
- Dangerous to Me (1959)
- It's Murder, Mr. Potter (1961)
- Repent at Leisure: a Mr. Potter Mystery (1962)
- Back Door to Death, a Mr. Potter Mystery (1963). Republished as Nightmare Honeymoon (1976).
- Scared to Death (1963)
- Fatal Lady: A Mr. Potter Mystery (1964)
- Suffer a Witch (1965)
- Call It Accident (1965)
- Wild Night (1966)
- The Shelton Conspiracy (1967)
- Fear of a Stranger (1967)
- Nightmare House (1968)
- No Hiding Place (1969)
- Girl on a High Wire (1969)
- A Calculated Risk (1970)
- This Woman Wanted (1971)
- Ominous Star (1971)
- Sleep Without Morning (1972)
- The First Mrs. Winston (1972)
- Malice Domestic (1972)
- Reckless Lady (1973)
- Trust a Woman? (1973)
- One O'clock at the Gotham (1974)
- The Dark Hill (1974)
- The Brownstone House (1974). Republished as Murder by Bequest (1976)
- The Barclay Place (1975)
- Put Out the Light (1976)
- Where Helen Lies (1976)
- The Slippery Step: A Novel of Suspense (1977)
- The Girl Who Had Everything (1978)

==== As Helen K. Maxwell ====
- The Girl in a Mask (1970)
- Leave It to Amanda (1972)
- The Livingston Heirs (1973)

=== Other ===
==== As Elinore Denniston ====
- Translation of Gouverneur Morris, Witness of Two Revolutions by Daniel Walther (1934)
- America's Silent Investigators; The Story of the Postal Inspectors Who Protect the United States Mail (1964)

==== As Elinore Denniston with Catherine Barjansky ====
- Portraits with Backgrounds (1947)

==== As Rae Foley ====
- Famous American Spies (1962)
- Famous Makers of America (1963)
