= Walt Blackadar =

Walter Lloyd Blackadar Jr. (August 13, 1922 – May 13, 1978) was an American whitewater pioneer, best known for his solo first descent of Turnback Canyon on the Alsek River.

== Life ==
Blackadar was a surgeon by profession. Raised in New Jersey and educated at Dartmouth College and Columbia University, he moved to Salmon, Idaho, in 1949. It wasn't until he reached the age of 43 that he started kayaking. He began running big rivers, typically of the Western United States and Canada, and soon he had several first descents to his credit.

He was the role model of a whole generation of paddlers. In America in the 1970s, he transformed the image of paddling from pure competition to outdoor recreation and exploration. One of his most spectacular achievements was the first descent of Turnback Canyon on the Alsek River, which he ran solo on August 25, 1971; and in 1972, he achieved the first descent of Devils Canyon on the Susitna River in Alaska.

In Turnback Canyon, after a chunk of ice in a large hydraulic damaged his kayak and he had barely reached the shore, he wrote in his diary:

One huge horrendous mile of hair, 30 feet wide, 50,000 cubic feet per second and a twenty degree downgrade going like hell. Incredible! I did not flip in that mile or I would not be writing ... I'll never go back, not for $50,000, not for all tea in China. Heed my words well and do not be a ass! It's unpaddleable!

Sports Illustrated compared his success at Turnback Canyon with the first ascent of Mount Everest. Canada named a mountain in the Alsek Range in his honor; Turnback Canyon is located on the west flank of Mount Blackadar.

In 1972, with Roger Hazelwood and Kay Swanson, Blackadar attempted the first descent of Devil’s Canyon of the Susitna River in Alaska. While they completed the descent alive, there were several swims and two lost boats. He ran Devil’s Canyon again in 1976 and 1977, the former filmed for the TV show American Sportsman; he was not able to complete the run without swimming.

Blackadar appeared in many other episodes of American Sportsman, running the Grand Canyon and other western “big water” rivers. He also appeared in a full-length feature documentary, The Edge (1976), running the Grand Canyon.

Blackadar's paddling career suffered a tragedy in 1974, when young Julie Wilson lost her life while running the West Fork of the Bruneau with him in Idaho. The rapid was later named Julie Wilson Falls in her honor. Blackadar was greatly saddened by the loss, and it affected his aggressive, devil-may-care approach to the sport.

In 1974, Blackadar learned of Evel Knievel's plan to jump the Snake River Canyon on a rocket-powered motorcycle, and he resolved to be there to witness the event. Sneaking onto the river with four kayakers, he positioned himself in the rapids below the jump. When Knievel's parachute opened prematurely and his cycle floated down toward the river, crashing on the banks, Blackadar got to him. He checked Knievel out and accompanied the daredevil to the helicopter for evacuation.

On May 13, 1978, he had a fatal accident on the South Fork of the Payette River, Idaho, when he became pinned under a downed tree at the water's surface. The rapid is named in his honor. A memorial, marked by a bronze plaque on a rough boulder, is located in Garden Valley Cemetery, overlooking the river where he died.

== Honors and awards ==
- Inducted into the International Whitewater Hall of Fame, 2007
- Mount Blackadar
- American Canoe Association Legends Of Paddling Award, 2011

== Resources ==
- Ron Watters: Never Turn Back. The Life of Whitewater Pioneer Walt Blackadar. Great Rift Press, 1995, ISBN 1-877625-02-7, http://www.ronwatters.com/NTB.html.
- John Long: The Liquid Locomotive. Legendary Whitewater River Stories. Globe Pequot Press, 1999, ISBN 1-56044-856-3.
- Devil's Canyon of the Susitna, 1976 American Sportsman video. Blackadar’s second descent, with Barney Griffith.
- Blackadar, Sports Illustrated, 'Caught up in A Hell of White Water', August 13, 1972.
