= Lullington =

Lullington is a common place-name in England, and may refer to:

- Lullington, Derbyshire
- Lullington, East Sussex
- Lullington, Somerset
