= Joe Callahan (footballer) =

Australian rules footballer

Personal information
- Full name: Daniel Joseph Patrick Callahan
- Born: 19 February 1898; Birchip, Victoria
- Died: 24 May 1978 (aged 80); Parkville, Victoria
- Original team: Birchip
- Height: 191 cm (6 ft 3 in)
- Weight: 89 kg (196 lb)

Playing career^{1}
Years	Club	Games (Goals)
1922–24	Essendon	27 (11)
- ^{1} Playing statistics correct to the end of 1924.

Daniel Joseph Patrick Callahan (19 February 1898 – 24 May 1978) was an Australian rules footballer who played with Essendon in the Victorian Football League (VFL).
