= Baron Feyzi =

Turkish footballer

Personal information
- Date of birth: 1893
- Date of death: May 5, 1978
- Place of death: Istanbul, Turkey
- Position: Midfielder

International career
| Years | Team | Apps | (Gls) |
| 1923 | Turkey | 1 | (0) |

Baron Feyzi (1893 – May 5, 1978) was a Turkish footballer. He played in one match for the Turkey national football team in 1923. He was also part of Turkey's squad for the football tournament at the 1928 Summer Olympics, but he did not play in any matches.
