= Käthe Voderberg =

German botanist (1910–1978)

Käthe Voderberg

Käthe Voderberg (1 August 1910 – 10 May 1978) née Nehls was a German botanist. She was a professor and the director of the institute for botany at the Humboldt University of Berlin.

== Life ==
Voderberg studied natural sciences in Hamburg, Berlin, Innsbruck and Greifswald from 1930 to 1935. She finished her doctorate in botany at the University of Greifswald in 1936. In 1947, she habilitated at the University of Greifswald and became a lecturer at the Humboldt University of Berlin.

In 1951, she was appointed professor and director of the institute for botany at the Humboldt University of Berlin. In 1956, she became head of the Agricultural Department. Starting in 1961, she was a professor with a chair in botany and dean of the faculty for Agriculture (1st female dean of the faculty). In 1970, she became an emeritus professor. She died in 1978.

== Research ==
During her habilitation, her research focused on the development of the fruit body of the Coprinus lagopus.

== Selected publications ==
- Nehls, Käthe (1936-01-01). "Über die leukozytären Elemente in der Schleimhaut des Verdauungstraktes bei Salamandrinen". Zeitschrift für Zellforschung und Mikroskopische Anatomie (in German). 25 (2): 283–311. doi:10.1007/BF00375539. ISSN 1432-0878. S2CID 39418846.
- Voderberg, Käthe (1948). "Zum Nähr- und Wirkstoffbedarf von Coprinus lagopus". Zeitschrift für Naturforschung B. 3 (7–8): 272–279. doi:10.1515/znb-1948-7-808. ISSN 1865-7117. S2CID 95394825.
- Voderberg, Käthe (1949-09-01). "Zur Fruchtkörperbildung von Coprinus Lagopus". Planta (in German). 37 (2): 149–160. doi:10.1007/BF01916190. ISSN 1432-2048. S2CID 39318678.
- Voderberg, Käthe (1950-01-01). "Die Abhängigkeit der Fruchtkörperentwicklung bei Coprinus lagopus von inneren und äusseren Faktoren". Planta (in German). 37 (5): 612–625. doi:10.1007/BF01927757. ISSN 1432-2048. S2CID 10819773.
- Voderberg, K. (1959-01-01). "Hemmstoffe aus quellenden und keimenden Samen vonVicia villosa Roth". Naturwissenschaften (in German). 46 (12): 406. Bibcode:1959NW.....46..406V. doi:10.1007/BF00628970. ISSN 1432-1904. S2CID 36389330.
- Voderberg, Käthe (1961-01-01). "Quellung und Keimung der Samen von Vicia villosa Roth". Flora oder Allgemeine Botanische Zeitung. 150 (1): 170–174. doi:10.1016/S0367-1615(17)33192-0. ISSN 0367-1615.
- Voderberg, Käthe (1962-08-18). "Wird der Mensch von Tabletten leben". Neue Zeit.
- Voderberg, Käthe (1965-02-27). "Über den Zeitsinn der Lebewesen". Neues Deutschland.
