= Zygmunt Plater-Zyberk =

Polish-American functionalist architect

Zygmunt Plater-Zyberk (July 20, 1901, Bebrene – May 7, 1978, in Philadelphia) was a Polish architect, representative of functionalism.

== Biography ==
He was born into a noble family on the family Bebrene Manor. His father was Jozafat Maria Aleksander Plater-Zyberk, while his mother was Maria, née Wielopolska, daughter of Warsaw's president Zygmunt Andrzej Wielopolski. His brother was architect Józefat Maria Plater-Zyberk, father of architect Elizabeth Plater-Zyberk.

Zygmunt Plater-Zyberk designed houses in the modernist style in Warsaw, such as the 1934 residential house on Szucha Avenue, built in the International style, referring in style to Neo-Expressionism, with elements of the streamline style – the risalits housing the staircases received round windows resembling portholes. He was also the main designer of the Horse Racing Track complex in Warsaw's Służewiec district, opened on June 3, 1939. He also designed houses located at 25 Chocimska Street and 10 Senacka Street, as well as an apartment house at 20 Puławska Street (corner of Narbutta Street).

He died on May 7, 1978, in Philadelphia, US. He was buried at Holy Trinity Polish Catholic Cemetery in Phoenixville, Pennsylvania.
