= Vivi Laurent-Täckholm =

Swedish botanist

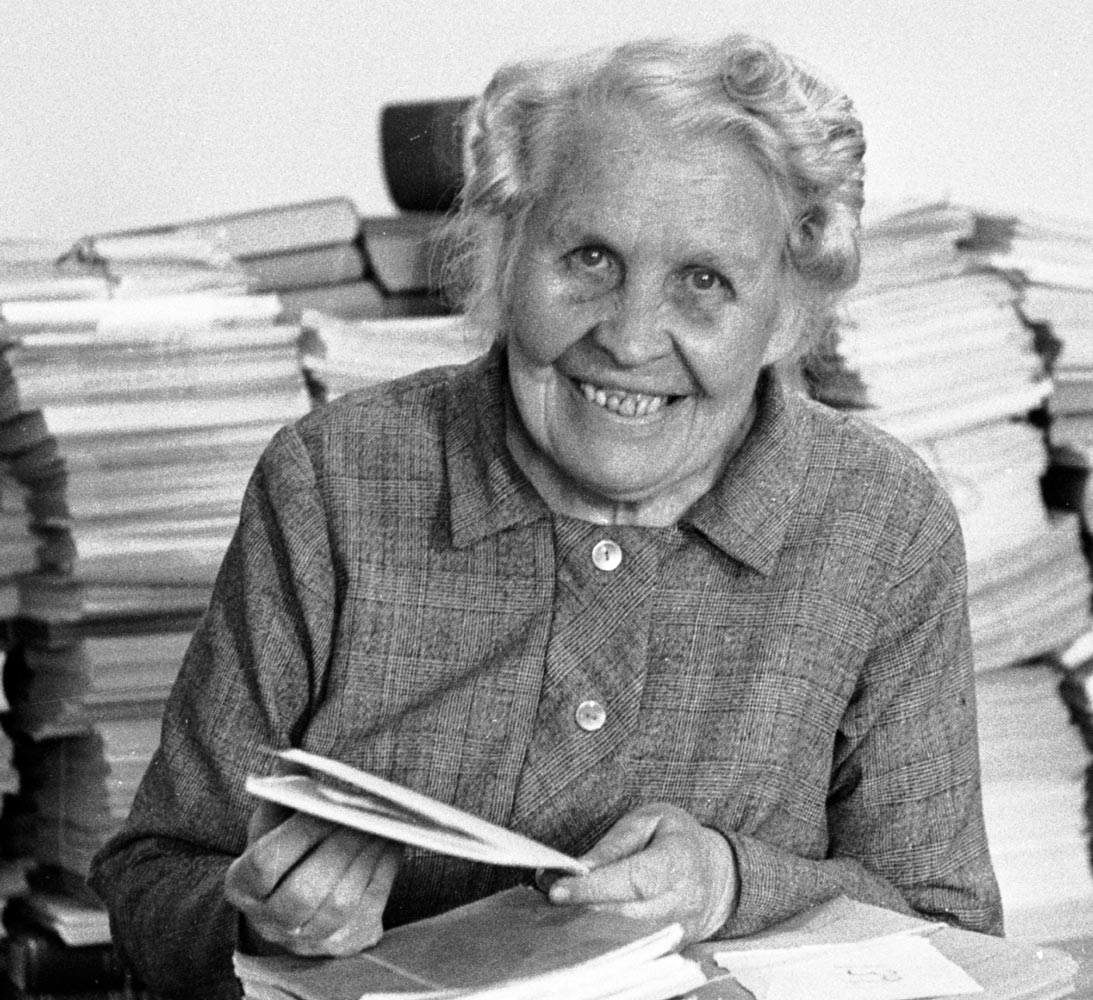
Vivi Laurent-Täckholm

Vivi Laurent-Täckholm (7 January 1898, Danderyd – 3 May 1978) was a Swedish botanist and children's book writer, active in Egypt.

== Early years and education ==
Vivi Laurent-Täckholm was the daughter of Dr. Wilhelm Edvard Laurent and Lilly Jenny Karolina Bergstrand. She was the sister of Torbern Laurent and aunt to Torvard C. Laurent. She studied botany at the Stockholm University and received her degree in 1921. She traveled to the US from 1921 to 1923. In 1926, she married botany professor Gunnar Täckholm (1891–1933). They moved to Egypt the same year and began work on the flora of Egypt.

== Career ==
During World War II, she worked at a newspaper in Stockholm but moved back to Egypt after the war. She became a professor at the University of Cairo in 1946, in Alexandria University in 1947 and again in Cairo in 1948. In 1952, she became Honorary Doctor of Philosophy at the Stockholm University.

Täckholm built the Botanical Institute at Cairo University. She collected a herbarium, which became the largest in Africa with about 100,000 plants from around the world, especially from Egypt, Lebanon, Arabia and Sudan. Thanks to her Swedish contacts, the Agricultural Academy in Stockholm sent a 700 kg literature library, and Gustaf VI Adolf of Sweden financed the purchase of foreign literature. SIDA donated a microfilm collection of more than half a million pages of books and herbarium specimens. Thanks to the Wallenberg Foundation at the Stockholm University, the university was able to build up a laboratory for pollen analysis including an electron microscope. During Täckholm's time, the department had about 20 professors and other teachers and over 2,000 students.

Täckholm died during a visit to Sweden and is buried at Uppsala Old Cemetery.

The standard author abbreviation Täckh. is used to indicate this person as the author when citing a botanical name.

== Selected works ==
- Vivis resa. Ett år som piga från New York till San Francisco, 1923
- Vivis resa II. Från Saltsjöbaden till Pacifikens stränder, 1924
- Sagan om Snipp, Snapp, Snorum (1926)
- En skolflicka berättar, 1927
- Katt: en kärlekssaga berättad och tecknad, 1936
- Som husmor i Egypten, 1937
- Bättre än svarta börsen: Vivi berättar hur hon lever gott och riktigt på kupongerna. Utg. av Husmodern. [Recepten av Capucine. Illustr. av Gunila Stierngranat], 1942
- Husmoderns blomsterlexikon, vol I o II, 1946
- Hemmet blommar, en liten handbok i krukväxtodling, 1949
- Faraos blomster: en kulturhistorisk-botanisk skildring av livet i Gamla Egypten, 1951
- Våra hav: En bok för stora och små, bilder av Veronica Leo, 1978
- Öknen blommar, 1969
- Lillans resa till månen: En saga för stora och små, bilder av Veronica Leo, 1976
- Egypten i närbild, 1964
- Sagans minareter: En bok om islam, 1971
- Levande forntid: Strövtåg i Kairomuseet, 1967
- Egyptisk vardag, 1966
- Faraos barn: Kopterna i Egypten, 1965
- Students Flora of Egypt. 2:a utgåvan tryckt i Beirut 1974. Publ. av Universitetet i Kairo. En grön "bibel" på 888 sidor!

== Literature ==
- Irma Ridbäck: Vivi Täckholm – botanist och kulturinstitution, 1994
- Beata Arnborg: Professor Vivi – den sagolika botanisten, Bokförlaget Atlantis, Stockholm 2008, ISBN 978-91-7353-217-4

== Bibliography ==
- Sjöberg, Fredrik (2 June 2015). The Fly Trap. Knopf Doubleday Publishing Group. ISBN 978-1-101-87016-7.

== See also ==
- Dr Waheeb speaking of Vivi Laurent-Täckholm (Swedish).
