= Joseph LoPiccolo (organized crime) =

American mobster

Joseph "Baldie" LoPiccolo (April 28, 1918 – May 21, 1978) was an American criminal and member of the New York Gambino crime family and a capo under Santo Trafficante, Jr.'s criminal organization. His specialty was narcotics trafficking.

== Early years ==
Born in Chicago, Illinois, on April 28, 1918, LoPiccolo was the son of Felipo and Margherita LoPiccolo. He had two brothers, Anthony and Frank, and two sisters, Loretta and Carmella.

== Drug trade ==
LoPiccolo moved to New York City and joined the Gambino family. As a made man, he was involved in narcotics, illegal gambling, loansharking, and the vending machine business. During the 1940s and 1950s, LoPiccolo established a narcotics distribution system throughout Florida, becoming one of the largest drug traffickers during the post-World War II period.

In August 1958, LoPiccolo was convicted of violating federal narcotics laws and sentenced to twenty years' imprisonment. He served his sentence at Leavenworth Federal Penitentiary in Leavenworth, Kansas.

== Release and demise ==
After his release from prison, LoPiccolo returned to criminal
