= Barbara Lull =

American violinist (1905–1978)

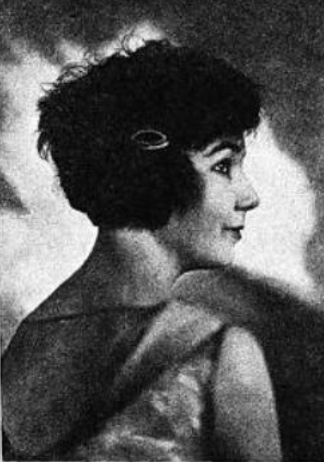
- Barbara Lull, from a 1927 publication
- Born: Barbara Wood Lull; January 25, 1905; Belmont, California, U.S.
- Died: May 18, 1978 (age 73); Berkeley, California, U.S.
- Other names: Barbara Lull Rahm, Barbara Rahm
- Occupation: Violinist

Barbara Wood Lull Rahm (January 25, 1905 – May 18, 1978) was an American violinist, a student of Leopold Auer. Later in life she taught violin in Berkeley, California.

== Early life and education ==
Lull was born in Belmont, California, and raised in Portland, Oregon, the daughter of Henry Morris Lull and Alice M. Woods Lull. Her mother was a violinist, and her father was a railroad executive. She was considered a musical prodigy. She moved to New York at age 15, and studied violin with Leopold Auer.

== Career ==
Lull played violin with a "fine-spun tone of delicate beauty and warmth, a firm bow and emotional feeling tempered with artistic restraint," according to a report in The New York Times. She performed at the Royal Albert Hall in 1924, sharing the bill with vocalists Evelyn Scotney and Umberto Urbano. In 1928, she played Aaron Copland's "Ukelele Serenade" at a concert in New York City, with Copland himself accompanying her on piano. "Miss Lull plays with a vigor that results in brilliance, rhythmical accuracy and a big tone," reported The Musical Leader after a Town Hall concert in 1928. She toured in the United States, Canada, and Europe. She was a soloist with the Baltimore Symphony in 1932. She gave a recital at the Peabody Conservatory in 1933.

In later life, Lull taught violin in Berkeley, California. She was concertmaster and assistant conductor of the University of California Symphony, and played second violin in the Oakland Symphony.

== Personal life, death and legacy ==
Lull married engineering professor Louis Frank Rahm in 1929. They lived in Princeton, New Jersey, and had two sons, Michael and Richard. They divorced in 1947, and she moved to Berkeley with her sons, and lived with her mother and younger brother there. She listed her occupation as "professional violinist" in the 1950 census. She died in 1978, at the age of 73, in Berkeley. The San Francisco Conservatory of Music has a Barbara Lull Rahm Scholarship Fund for young musicians, established as a memorial to her.
