= Louis Dunford =

English singer and songwriter (born 1992)

- Born: Louis Mark Dunford; 20 January 1992 (age 34); Camden, London, England
- Origin: Camden Town, Camden, London, England
- Genres: Indie rock, Folk rock
- Instruments: Vocals, guitar, piano
- Years active: 2015–present
- Label: RCA
- Website: www.louis-dunford.com

Louis Mark Dunford (born 20 January 1992) is an English singer and songwriter. The son of actress Linda Robson, he is known for writing the song "The Angel (North London Forever)" in 2022, which became an anthem for Arsenal F.C. and Arsenal F.C. supporters.

== Early life ==
Louis Mark Dunford was born on 20 January 1992 in Camden, London. He is the son of English actress and television personality Linda Robson, best known for her role in the sitcom Birds of a Feather and being a panellist on Loose Women, and her husband Mark Dunford.

Dunford was a school friend of Ben Kinsella, and was present at the scene when he was fatally stabbed to death in Islington in June 2008.

== Career ==
Dunford is from Islington in North London where he began playing the piano aged 15 after his family moved into a house which happened to have a piano already in it which he then had to persuade his parents to keep. He started playing Elton John songs and then began to mix music with his own poetry. He learnt to play guitar because the piano was too loud to play late at night in the house. He played his first gig at a pub called The Library and afterwards he said to his father he would eventually sell out The Union Chapel venue opposite it, which he did in 2022. In 2012, Dunford and Charlie Quirke alternated playing the role of Travis Stubbs in the stage version of their mothers' comedy television series Birds of a Feather. Dunford's music was discovered by Jamal Edwards in 2014 through hearing his song When We Were Hooligans on YouTube. Dunford has said he writes songs about the area around him, his experiences and his friends. His first EP The Morland chronicled life on the Morland Estate in Islington as he saw it. The first single from that EP London's Requiem was a version of the first song he ever wrote. In 2021 Dunford signed with Sony Music and released a cover of East 17's hit single Stay Another Day, the video for which featured Dunford wearing the white fur trimmed parka jacket visible in the 1994 Christmas number one song video. In 2022 Dunford supported Jake Bugg on tour.

Dunford's second EP Popham EP contained the song "The Angel (North London Forever)", which has since become an anthem for the fans of Arsenal F.C. and has begun to be played in the pre-match of every home game Arsenal play at the Emirates Stadium. Dunford himself is an lifelong Arsenal fan and wrote the song as a paean to the culture and sense of community in North London. Dunford and the song were featured in the Amazon Original documentary series All or Nothing: Arsenal about the 2021–22 Arsenal F.C. season.

== Discography ==
=== Albums ===
List of albums, with selected chart positions
Title	Album details	Peak chart positions	
Title	Album details	UK	SCO
Live from Eventim Apollo Hammersmith	Released: January 2024; Label: RCA	-	63
Be Lucky	Released: February 2025; Label: RCA	8	6

=== Extended plays ===
List of EPs, with selected details
Title	Details
The Popham	Released: May 2022; Label: RCA

=== Charting singles ===
List of singles, with selected chart positions
Title	Year	Chart positions
Title	Year	UK Sales
"The Popham"	2022	81
"The Angel"	2022	5
"The Boy Who Could Fly"	2022	50
"Lucy"	2023	94
"The Local"	2024	53
"Billy Flynn of Bethnal Green"	2024	87
