= The Angel (North London Forever) =

2022 song by Louis Dunford

Single by Louis Dunford

from the EP The Popham
- Released: 25 February 2022
- Length: 3:58
- Label: RCA
- Songwriter: Louis Dunford
- Composer: Louis Dunford
- Producers: James Mellor, Evie-Clark Yospa

"The Angel (North London Forever)" is a song by English singer-songwriter Louis Dunford. It was released on 25 February 2022 by RCA Records as the second single from his second EP, The Popham.

== Background ==
Dunford wrote the song as a love letter to his hometown of Islington, North London, as well as his family and friends living in the borough.

It is also dedicated to Premier League football club Arsenal, based in Islington, as the artist is a life-long supporter of the team.

== Music video ==
The official music video was directed by Oscar J. Ryan and released on 25 February 2022 through Dunford's own YouTube channel.

== Arsenal connection ==
Two months after its release, the song gained traction by getting noticed and shared by fellow Arsenal supporters on social media. It eventually got to the attention of Mikel Arteta, Arsenal's manager, who wanted to capture a club spirit, and invited Dunford to visit the club's training ground and meet the players.

On 8 May 2022, Dunford was invited by Arsenal's board as a special guest, together with his family and his friends, at the Emirates Stadium, in order to watch the Premier League match against Leeds United: while the players were warming up on the pitch, thousands of fans across the stadium started singing the chorus of "The Angel". In his post-match interview, Mikel Arteta described the emotional impact the song had on his team, saying quote:

It was really emotional, you know? I think there is a link with the way the team started because they were making comments in the dressing room, hearing the song with the spirit and the emotion that they did, it was unique. I have never experienced that here, it was the first time and I really enjoyed it and I hope that the fans enjoyed it too.

Since then, the song has been regarded as Arsenal's anthem, and it is played before every home game at the Emirates Stadium.

Following the success of his song, Dunford was featured in the final episode of the Amazon Original sports docuseries, All or Nothing: Arsenal, which followed the club's coaching staff and players behind the scenes, both on and off the field, throughout their 2021–22 season.
