= All or Nothing: Arsenal =

Amazon Original sports docuseries

- Cover of the docuseries
- Genre: Sports documentary
- Starring: Arsenal Football Club
- Narrated by: Daniel Kaluuya
- No. of seasons: 1
- No. of episodes: 8

Production
- Executive producers: Mark Raphael; Clare Cameron; John Douglas
- Production locations: London, England
- Running time: 36–53 minutes
- Production company: 72 Films

Original release
- Network: Amazon Prime Video
- Release: 4 August – 18 August 2022

All or Nothing: Arsenal is an Amazon Original sports docuseries as part of the All or Nothing brand. In the series, English Premier League side Arsenal's progress was charted through their 2021–22 season, in which they were the youngest team in the Premier League.

The series was produced by 72 Films, executive produced by Mark Raphael, Clare Cameron and BAFTA winner John Douglas.

The series was narrated by Academy Award- and BAFTA Award-winning actor Daniel Kaluuya, who was born and grew up in North London, and is a lifelong Arsenal supporter.

The first three episodes of the eight-part series were released on 4 August 2022, and further episodes were released on 11 and 18 August.

== Background ==
In the 2016–17 season, Arsenal won the FA Cup for a record thirteenth time-and a record seventh under Arsène Wenger, who became the most successful manager in the history of the competition, but fell out of the top four in the Premier League for the first time since before Wenger arrived in 1996, finishing fifth to end their 19-year run in the UEFA Champions League. After another unspectacular league season the following year, Wenger departed Arsenal on 13 May 2018, ending a 22-year, trophy–laden association with the club.

Unai Emery was named as the club's new head coach on 23 May 2018. In Emery's first season, Arsenal finished fifth in the Premier League and as runner-up in the UEFA Europa League. On 29 November 2019, Emery was sacked after Arsenal had gone seven games without a win in all competitions, which was their worst run in 27 years; and former player and assistant first-team coach Freddie Ljungberg was appointed as interim head coach.

On 20 December 2019, Arsenal appointed former club captain Mikel Arteta – who was 37 years old then and had never managed before – as the new head coach. The 2019–20 season had been defined by a three-month lull between March and June, caused by the COVID-19 pandemic; and when it returned, it was behind closed doors. Arsenal finished the league season in eighth, their lowest finish since 1994–95, but earned a record-extending 14th FA Cup win on 1 August 2020, helping them qualify for next season's Europa League, and making Arteta the first person to win the FA Cup as both captain and coach of the club. After the Gunners triumphed in the 2020 FA Community Shield, Arteta's title was changed from head coach to manager. On 18 April 2021, Arsenal were announced as a founding club of the breakaway European competition The Super League; they withdrew from the competition two days later amid near-universal condemnation. Arsenal finished the 2020–21 season in eighth place once again, this time not qualifying for a European competition for the first time in 25 years.

== Plot ==
The series features a rollercoaster season for the club. With their three consecutive defeats without scoring a goal to open the 2021–22 Premier League campaign, Arsenal dropped to the bottom of the table, at 20th, which was their worst start to a season for 67 years. Since then, a new look Arsenal started to emerge with several academy graduates and new signings making a major impact. They finished the league season in fifth place with 22 wins, 3 draws and 13 defeats, and qualified for the 2022–23 UEFA Europa League.

== Episodes ==
No.	Title	Featured matches	Original release date
1	"New Beginnings"	Brentford 2–0 Arsenal (13 August); Arsenal 0–2 Chelsea (22 August); Manchester City 5–0 Arsenal (28 August); Arsenal 1–0 Norwich City (11 September)	4 August 2022
2	"The North London Derby"	Burnley 0–1 Arsenal (18 September); Arsenal 3–1 Tottenham Hotspur (26 September)	4 August 2022
3	"Stay In The Game"	Arsenal 3–1 Aston Villa (22 October); Leicester City 0–2 Arsenal (30 October); Liverpool 4–0 Arsenal (20 November); Everton 2–1 Arsenal (6 December)	4 August 2022
4	"Respect, Commitment, Passion"	Arsenal 3–0 Southampton (11 December); Arsenal 2–0 West Ham United (15 December); Leeds United 1–4 Arsenal (18 December); Arsenal 1–2 Manchester City (1 January)	11 August 2022
5	"The Exit"	Nottingham Forest 1–0 Arsenal (9 January); Liverpool 0–0 Arsenal (13 January); Arsenal 0–2 Liverpool (20 January); Wolverhampton Wanderers 0–1 Arsenal (10 February)	11 August 2022
6	"Super Mik Arteta"	Arsenal 2–1 Brentford (19 February); Arsenal 2–1 Wolverhampton Wanderers (24 February); Arsenal 0–2 Liverpool (16 March); Aston Villa 0–1 Arsenal (19 March)	11 August 2022
7	"A Lightbulb Moment"	Crystal Palace 3–0 Arsenal (4 April); Arsenal 1–2 Brighton & Hove Albion (9 April); Southampton 1–0 Arsenal (16 April); Chelsea 2–4 Arsenal (20 April); Arsenal 3–1 Manchester United (23 April)	18 August 2022
8	"North London Forever"	West Ham United 1–2 Arsenal (1 May); Arsenal 2–1 Leeds United (8 May); Tottenham Hotspur 3–0 Arsenal (12 May); Newcastle United 2–0 Arsenal (16 May); Arsenal 5–1 Everton (22 May)	18 August 2022

== Cast ==
=== Players ===
In the 2021–22 season, Arsenal were the youngest team in the Premier League with an average starting age of 24 years and 308 days – more than a whole year younger than the next team.

First-team players

The following first-team players make appearances in the docuseries.

Notes:
- Age as of 1 July 2021
- Flags indicate national team as defined under FIFA eligibility rules. Players may change their FIFA nationalities after the 2021–22 season.

No.	Pos	Nation	Name	Age	Date signed	Signed from
1	GK	(Germany) GER	Bernd Leno	29	19 June 2018	(Germany) Bayer Leverkusen
3	DF	(Scotland) SCO	Kieran Tierney	24	8 August 2019	(Scotland) Celtic
4	DF	(England) ENG	Ben White	23	30 July 2021	(England) Brighton & Hove Albion
5	MF	(Ghana) GHA	Thomas Partey	28	5 October 2020	(Spain) Atlético Madrid
6	DF	(Brazil) BRA	Gabriel Magalhães	23	1 September 2020	(France) Lille
7	MF	(England) ENG	Bukayo Saka	19	14 September 2018	(England) Arsenal Academy
8	MF	(Norway) NOR	Martin Ødegaard	22	20 August 2021	(Spain) Real Madrid
9	FW	(France) FRA	Alexandre Lacazette	30	5 July 2017	(France) Lyon
10	MF	(England) ENG	Emile Smith Rowe	20	31 July 2017	(England) Arsenal Academy
14	FW	(Gabon) GAB	Pierre-Emerick Aubameyang	32	31 January 2018	(Germany) Borussia Dortmund
15	MF	(England) ENG	Ainsley Maitland-Niles	23	24 October 2014	(England) Arsenal Academy
16	DF	(England) ENG	Rob Holding	25	22 July 2016	(England) Bolton Wanderers
17	DF	(Portugal) POR	Cédric Soares	29	24 June 2020	(England) Southampton
18	DF	(Japan) JPN	Takehiro Tomiyasu	22	31 August 2021	(Italy) Bologna
19	FW	(Ivory Coast) CIV	Nicolas Pépé	26	1 August 2019	(France) Lille
20	DF	(Portugal) POR	Nuno Tavares	21	10 July 2021	(Portugal) Benfica
21	DF	(England) ENG	Calum Chambers	26	28 July 2014	(England) Southampton
22	DF	(Spain) ESP	Pablo Marí	27	24 June 2020	(Brazil) Flamengo
23	MF	(Belgium) BEL	Albert Sambi Lokonga	21	19 July 2021	(Belgium) Anderlecht
24	FW	(England) ENG	Reiss Nelson	21	23 December 2016	(England) Arsenal Academy
25	MF	(Egypt) EGY	Mohamed Elneny	28	14 January 2016	(Switzerland) Basel
26	FW	(England) ENG	Folarin Balogun	19	13 February 2019	(England) Arsenal Academy
30	FW	(England) ENG	Eddie Nketiah	22	14 September 2016	(England) Arsenal Academy
31	DF	(Bosnia and Herzegovina) BIH	Sead Kolašinac	28	6 June 2017	Free
32	GK	(England) ENG	Aaron Ramsdale	23	20 August 2021	(England) Sheffield United
33	GK	(England) ENG	Arthur Okonkwo	19	14 September 2018	(England) Arsenal Academy
34	MF	(Switzerland) SUI	Granit Xhaka	28	25 May 2016	(Germany) Borussia Mönchengladbach
35	FW	(Brazil) BRA	Gabriel Martinelli	20	2 July 2019	(Brazil) Ituano

Academy players

The following academy players who were substitutes for Arsenal's first team during the 2021–22 season make appearances in the docuseries.

Notes:
- Age as of 1 July 2021
- Flags indicate national team as defined under FIFA eligibility rules. Players may change their FIFA nationalities after the 2021–22 season.

No.	Pos	Nation	Name	Age	Date signed first professional contract
38	MF	(England) ENG	Miguel Azeez	18	24 September 2019
49	GK	(Estonia) EST	Karl Hein	19	9 May 2019
54	DF	(England) ENG	Alex Kirk	18	19 January 2021
58	FW	(Denmark) DEN	Mika Biereth	18	30 July 2021
61	DF	(Republic of Ireland) IRL	Mazeed Ogungbo	18	3 August 2021
65	MF	(Netherlands) NED	Salah-Eddine Oulad M'Hand	17	22 August 2020
69	DF	(England) ENG	Zak Swanson	20	3 April 2019
75	DF	(England) ENG	Zach Awe	17	15 February 2021
78	MF	(Mexico) MEX	Marcelo Flores	17	6 October 2020
82	FW	(England) ENG	Omari Hutchinson	17	12 November 2020
87	MF	(England) ENG	Charlie Patino	17	21 October 2020

=== Non-playing staff ===
Coaching and medical staff

Note: Age as of 1 July 2021

Position	Nation	Name	Age	Notes
First-team Manager	ESP	Mikel Arteta	39	From 1999 to 2011, Arteta had played for several European clubs including Barcelona, Paris Saint-Germain, Rangers, Real Sociedad, and Everton. He signed for Arsenal on transfer deadline day in summer 2011, where he won two FA Cups in 2014 and 2015. Arteta was appointed as Arsenal's captain by then manager Arsène Wenger for 2 seasons from 2014 until his retirement in 2016. He was an assistant coach to Pep Guardiola at Manchester City between 2016 and 2019. Arteta returned to Arsenal as head coach on 20 December 2019. After winning the 2020 FA Cup and 2020 FA Community Shield, his title was changed to manager. Arteta is multilingual, and is fluent in Spanish, Basque, Catalan and English. He also speaks French, Italian and Portuguese.
First-team Assistant Coaches	NED	Albert Stuivenberg	50	Stuivenberg was appointed as an assistant coach to Louis van Gaal at Manchester United between 2014 and 2016. He was an assistant coach of the Wales national football team from 2017 to 2021. Stuivenberg joined Arsenal on 24 December 2019.
First-team Assistant Coaches	ENG	Steve Round	50	From 2008 to 2013, Round was an assistant coach to David Moyes at Everton, where Arteta spent six years and a half at as a player before joining Arsenal. He was named assistant coach to Arteta on 24 December 2019.
First-team Assistant Coaches	ESP	Carlos Cuesta	25	Cuesta was previously a coach at Spanish side Atlético Madrid and Italian side Juventus. He got to know Arteta during a visit with Manchester City in 2018. Cuesta was appointed as an assistant coach to Arteta on 28 August 2020. He was the Individual Development Coach in the 2021–22 season.
First-team Assistant Coaches	FRA	Nicolas Jover	39	Jover previously worked with Arteta at Manchester City after spending seasons at Brentford. He joined Arsenal in July 2021, and was the set piece coach in the 2021–22 season.
First-team Assistant Coaches	ESP	Miguel Molina	28	Molina was previously a coach at Spanish club Atlético Madrid. On 28 August 2020, he was appointed as an assistant coach to Arteta.
First-team Goalkeeping Coach	ESP	Iñaki Caña	45	Before joining Arsenal on 24 December 2019, Caña was a goalkeeping coach at Brentford. He started his playing career at Spanish side Barcelona, where Arteta's senior career began at.
Academy Manager	GER	Per Mertesacker	36	Mertesacker has supported Arsenal since he was a teenager. He began his senior career at German club Hannover 96 in 2003. After spending seasons at fellow German side Werder Bremen, Mertesacker signed for Arsenal on 31 August 2011, the same day Arteta joined Arsenal on. He won three FA Cups in 2014, 2015 and 2017 with the club. Mertesacker was appointed as Arsenal's captain by Arsène Wenger for 2 seasons from 2016 until his retirement in 2018. He was announced as the new Arsenal Academy manager prior to the 2017–18 season, officially assuming the position in July 2018. After Unai Emery's sacking in late November 2019, Mertesacker took the role as interim assistant manager to support interim head coach Freddie Ljungberg for the meantime.
Head of Performance	USA	Shad Forsythe	48	Forsythe was previously a fitness coach and performance manager for the Germany national football team. After Germany won the 2014 FIFA World Cup, he joined Arsenal in August 2014.
Head of Sports Medicine	IRL	Dr Gary O'Driscoll	50	Dr O'Driscoll previously worked with the Ireland national rugby union team. He has been with Arsenal since the start of 2009.

Management team

Note: Age as of 1 July 2021

Position	Nation	Name	Age	Notes
Director	USA	Josh Kroenke	41	Son of Stan Kroenke who is the owner of Kroenke Sports & Entertainment, which is the holding company of Arsenal Football Club and a number of North American professional sports teams – including the Los Angeles Rams (NFL), the Denver Nuggets (NBA), the Colorado Avalanche (NHL), and the Colorado Rapids (MLS).
Non-Executive Director	ENG	Tim Lewis		Lewis comes from a family of Arsenal supporters and has a longstanding association with the club. He is a partner with Clifford Chance, an international law firm headquartered in London. Lewis was appointed as a non-executive director to the Arsenal boards on 1 July 2020.
Chief Executive Officer	ENG	Vinai Venkatesham		Venkatesham joined Arsenal from London 2012 – the team behind the 2012 Summer Olympics – in 2010. He was appointed as CEO on 15 August 2020.
Technical Director	BRA	Edu Gaspar	43	Edu started his senior career in Série A with Brazilian side Corinthians in 1998. He signed for Arsenal in January 2001. Edu became the first Brazilian to win the Premier League after Arsenal won the 2001–02 league title. He was a member of "The Invincibles" team of the 2003–04 Arsenal season managed by Arsène Wenger. After his retirement, Edu was the general coordinator of the Brazil national football team from 2016 to 2019. He was appointed as Arsenal's first ever technical director on 9 July 2019.
Director of Football Operations	ENG	Richard Garlick		Garlick was previously director of football at the Premier League between 2018 and 2021. He is a qualified solicitor specialising in sports law. Garlick started work at Arsenal as director of football operations in May 2021.

=== Other ===
Former players

Note: Age as of 1 July 2021

Nation	Name	Age	Notes
FRA	Thierry Henry	43	Henry began his senior career at Ligue 1 club Monaco in 1994. After spending half a year at Italian side Juventus, Henry signed for Arsenal on 3 August 1999. Under long-time mentor and coach Arsène Wenger, Henry became a prolific striker and Arsenal's all-time leading scorer with 228 goals in all competitions. He won the Premier League Golden Boot a record four times, won two FA Cups and two Premier League titles with the club, including one during an unbeaten Invincible season. Henry spent his final two seasons with Arsenal as club captain, leading them to the 2006 UEFA Champions League Final. Considered one of the greatest strikers of all time and one of the greatest players in the history of the Premier League, Henry was runner-up for the Ballon d'Or in 2003 and FIFA World Player of the Year in 2004. He was named the PFA Players' Player of the Year twice, the FWA Footballer of the Year three times, and was named in the PFA Team of the Year six consecutive times. Henry, along with Alan Shearer, was one of the inaugural inductees into the Premier League Hall of Fame in 2021.
ENG	David Seaman	57	From 1982 to 1990, Seaman had played for several clubs including Peterborough United, Birmingham City, and Queens Park Rangers. He signed for Arsenal in summer 1990. As a goalkeeper with the club Seaman kept the most clean sheets in two Premier League seasons, won three league championships, a European Cup Winners' Cup, four FA Cups and a Football League Cup, including a domestic cup Double in 1993. He was named in the PFA Team of the Year once. Seaman was inducted into the English Football Hall of Fame in 2016.
ENG	Ian Wright	57	Wright started his professional career in the Second Division with Crystal Palace in 1985. He signed for Arsenal in September 1991. With the club Wright won the First Division Golden Boot, won a Premier League title, a European Cup Winners' Cup, two FA Cups and a Football League Cup, including a domestic cup Double in 1993. As of the 2021–22 season, he is Arsenal's second highest goalscorer of all time, behind Thierry Henry who broke his record in 2005. Wright was named in the PFA Team of the Year thrice. In 2005, he was inducted into the English Football Hall of Fame. Wright was also inducted into the Premier League Hall of Fame in 2022.

Entertainers

Note: Age as of 1 July 2021

Nation	Stage Name	Age	Notes
ENG	Chunkz	25	Chunkz is a YouTube personality, host, entertainer and former musician. He is an Arsenal fan.
ENG	Louis Dunford	29	Dunford is a singer and songwriter. He is an Arsenal supporter. The Angel (North London Forever) by Dunford has become a new anthem of Arsenal F.C. since May 2022.
ENG	KSI	28	KSI is a YouTuber, rapper and boxer. He is a supporter of Arsenal F.C.
ENG	Nadia Rose	28	Rose is a rapper and songwriter. She is an Arsenal supporter.
ENG	Wretch 32	36	Wretch 32 is a rapper, singer and songwriter. He is an Arsenal fan.

== Production ==
It was first announced on 9 July 2021 that Arsenal would be the subject of the Amazon Prime All or Nothing series, following similar projects with two English football clubs – Manchester City and Tottenham Hotspur. It was reported that Arsenal received around £11 million for the docuseries filmed in the 2021–22 season.

The series was produced during the COVID-19 pandemic. The documentary production crew were given access to the club to provide a behind-the-scenes look at the club. The goings-on at the club were captured by cameras and microphones at the Emirates Stadium and the Arsenal Training Centre. When the team were playing away, video footage was captured by a camera crew following the team.

== Release ==
The official teaser was released on 28 June 2022. The official full trailer was released on 19 July. Six official clips were released on 27 July, 2 August, 9 August, 10 August, 17 August, and 18 August, respectively.

The first screening of the docuseries was at Islington Assembly Hall in Islington, London on 2 August 2022.

The first three episodes were released on 4 August 2022, one day before the start of the 2022–23 Premier League season. Episode 4 to 6 were released on 11 August. The last two episodes were released on 18 August.
