= Shad Forsythe =

American soccer fitness coach (born 1973)

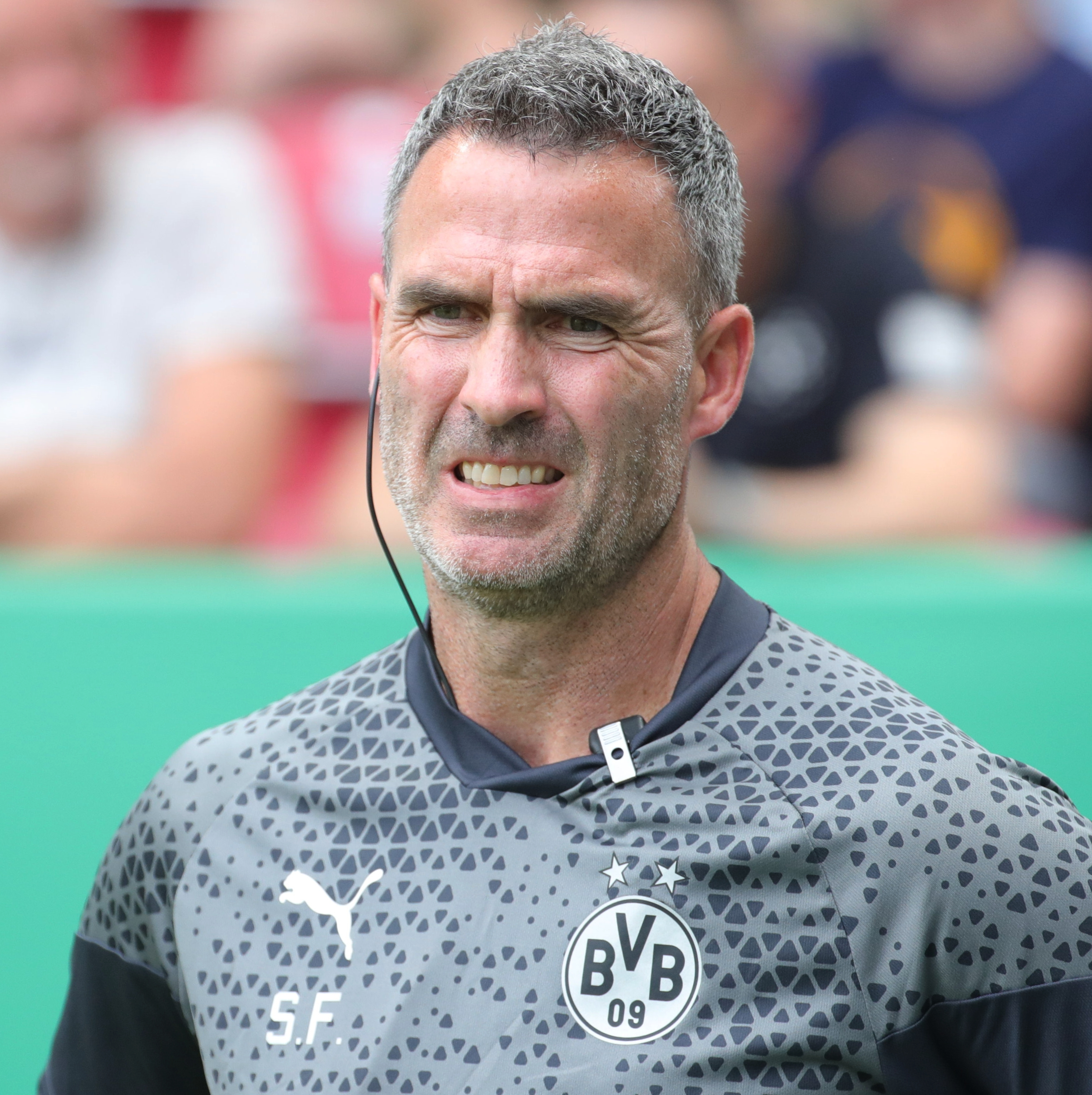
Shad Forsythe (2023)

Shad Forsythe (born 8 June 1973) is an American soccer fitness coach who was most recently a fitness coach at Bundesliga club Borussia Dortmund until June 2025.

== Career ==
Early in his career, Forsythe worked as a Performance Manager for the US-based company EXOS, before moving into football fulltime.

In 2004, Forsythe was appointed fitness coach for the Germany national team, where he worked for ten years. In 2014, he was hired as Head of Performance at Arsenal in England. Forsythe left the team in June 2022.

In 2022, he was appointed fitness coach of German club Borussia Dortmund after revising interest from Milan. In June 2025, his contract with Borussia Dortmund ended.
