= 2021–22 Arsenal F.C. season =

English football club season

Arsenal F.C.
2021–22 season
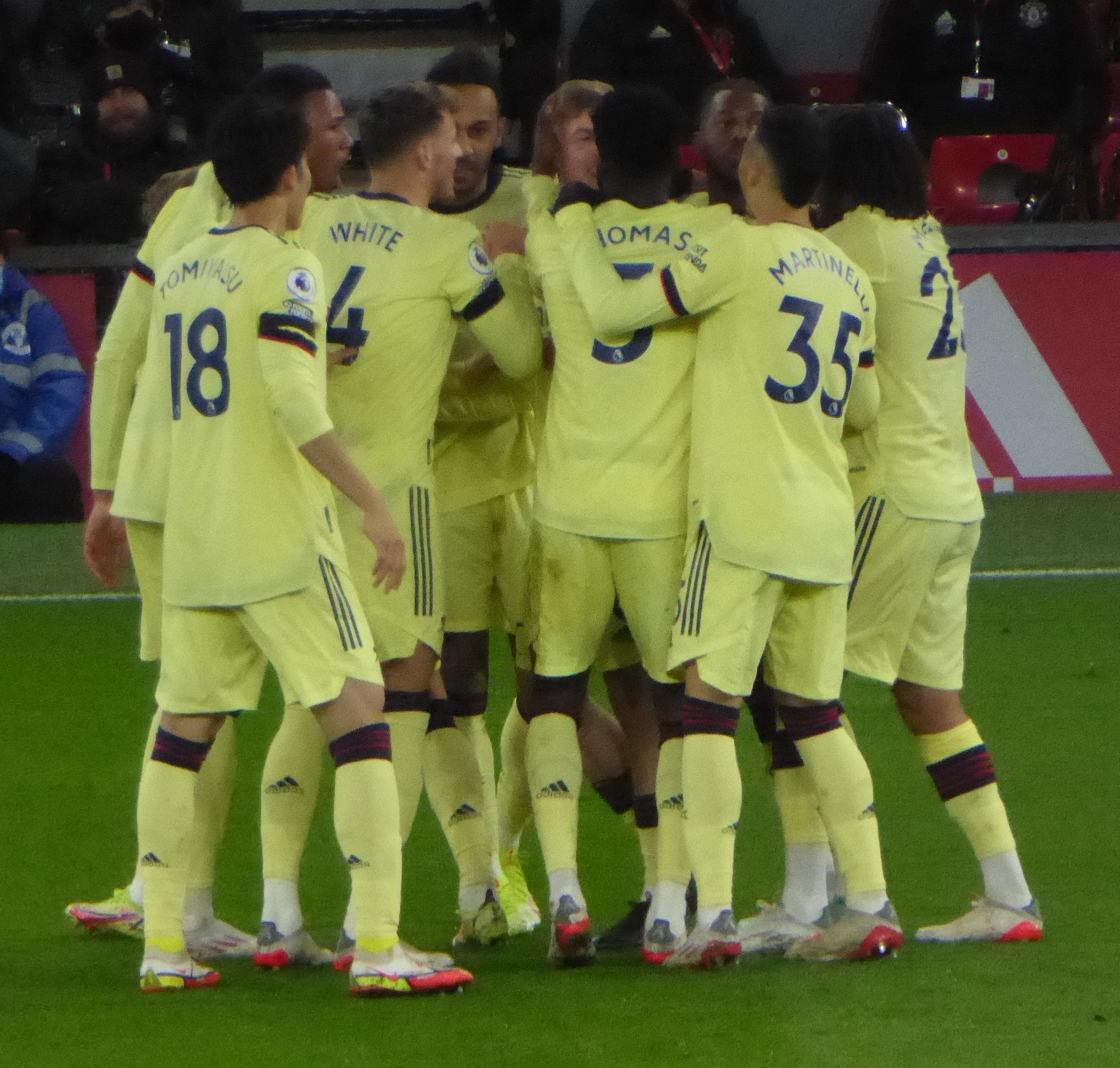
- Arsenal players in a Premier League match against Manchester United
- Owner: Kroenke Sports & Entertainment
- Manager: Mikel Arteta
- Stadium: Emirates Stadium
- Premier League: 5th
- FA Cup: Third round
- EFL Cup: Semi-finals
- Top goalscorer: League: Bukayo Saka (11); All: Bukayo Saka (12)
- Highest home attendance: 60,223 vs Manchester United (23 April 2022); Premier League
- Average home league attendance: 59,811
- Biggest win: 6–0 vs West Bromwich Albion (A) (25 August 2021); EFL Cup
- Biggest defeat: 0–5 vs Manchester City (A) (28 August 2021); Premier League
Home colours	Away colours	Third colours

The 2021–22 season was Arsenal Football Club's 30th season in the Premier League, their 96th consecutive season in the top flight of English football and 105th season in the top flight overall. It began on 1 July 2021 and concluded on 30 June 2022, with competitive matches played between August and May. In addition to the domestic league, Arsenal also participated in the FA Cup and EFL Cup, but they did not participate in any European competition for the first time since 1995–96, owing to an eighth-place finish the previous season.

Managed by Mikel Arteta in his second full season, Arsenal were the youngest team in the Premier League with an average starting age of 24 years and 308 days – more than a whole year younger than the next team. They finished fifth in the Premier League, and qualified for next season's UEFA Europa League.

The season was documented in the Amazon Prime Video series All or Nothing: Arsenal.

== Overview ==
=== June and July ===
On 24 June, Greek centre-back Konstantinos Mavropanos's loan spell at Bundesliga club Stuttgart was extended for another season.

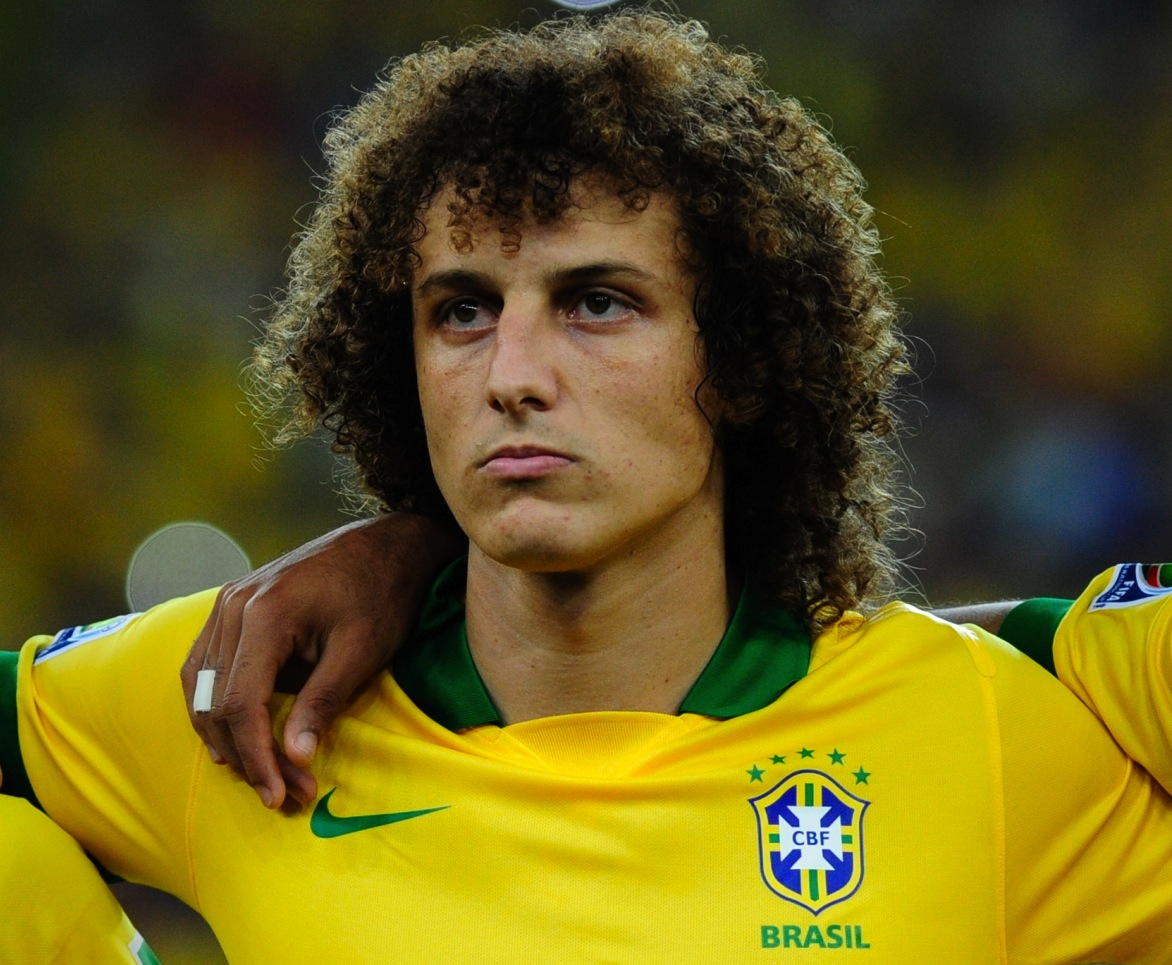
David Luiz playing for Brazil in 2013

On 1 July, Arsenal released several players, of which the only first-team player was Brazilian centre-back David Luiz, who was at the end of his contract; Luiz later joined Brazilian top-flight side Flamengo in September. At the same time, Spanish midfielder Dani Ceballos and Australian goalkeeper Mathew Ryan finished their loan spells and returned to Real Madrid and Brighton & Hove Albion, respectively, though the latter would join Real Sociedad on 12 July. On 6 July, French midfielder Matteo Guendouzi, who spent the entirety of the previous season on loan at Bundesliga club Hertha Berlin, was once again loaned out, this time to Ligue 1 club Marseille for the entire Ligue 1 season. Arsenal's first signing of the summer transfer window came on 10 July, with 21-year-old Portuguese left-back Nuno Tavares arriving from Benfica for about £8 million.

Arsenal had four players unavailable for pre-season friendlies, as Bernd Leno, Bukayo Saka, Kieran Tierney, and Granit Xhaka had competed in Euro 2020, which ended on 11 July. On 13 July, Arsenal began their pre-season tour of Scotland with a 2–1 defeat to Hibernian. This was followed by a match four days later against defending Scottish champions Rangers, who were celebrating their 150th anniversary. Arsenal fell behind twice but recovered for a 2–2 draw.

Between the two Scottish friendlies, it was announced on 15 July that French centre-back William Saliba, who spent the second half of last season on loan at Nice, would join Guendouzi at Marseille on a season-long loan deal. On 19 July, Arsenal made their second acquisition, signing 21-year-old Belgian midfielder Albert Sambi Lokonga from Anderlecht for about £17.2 million.

The day after, Arsenal withdrew from the seventh edition of the Florida Cup, citing "a small number of positive COVID-19 tests" among the staff. They had been set to compete with fellow Premier League club Everton, Serie A club Inter Milan, and Colombian top-flight club Millionarios, but they and fellow withdrawals Inter Milan were replaced by Atlético Nacional, also from the Colombian first division, and Liga MX club Pumas UNAM.

In lieu of the Florida Cup matches, Arsenal organised friendlies at their London Colney training ground against two other London sides, Millwall from the EFL Championship on 24 July and newly promoted Premier League side Watford on 28 July, with both matches finishing 4–1 to Arsenal.

Arsenal concluded the month with the announced signing of 23-year-old English centre-back Ben White on 30 July, who joined from fellow Premier League club Brighton & Hove Albion on a £50 million deal.

=== August ===
To finish their pre-season, Arsenal participated in the Mind Series pre-season tournament, which supported Mind and other mental health charities, against London rivals Chelsea and Tottenham Hotspur. The Gunners faced Chelsea on 1 August at home in the first of the two matches. Manager Mikel Arteta opted to not start any of the new signings, although Ben White was substituted on at halftime for his debut. Granit Xhaka's second-half header equalised after Kai Havertz's first-half goal, but minutes later, Tammy Abraham capitalised on an Arsenal defensive error to give Chelsea the lead again. A shot from Joe Willock in the last ten minutes looked to have crossed the goal line, but without the aid of goal-line technology, referee Andre Marriner did not award the goal, and the match ended 2–1 to Chelsea.

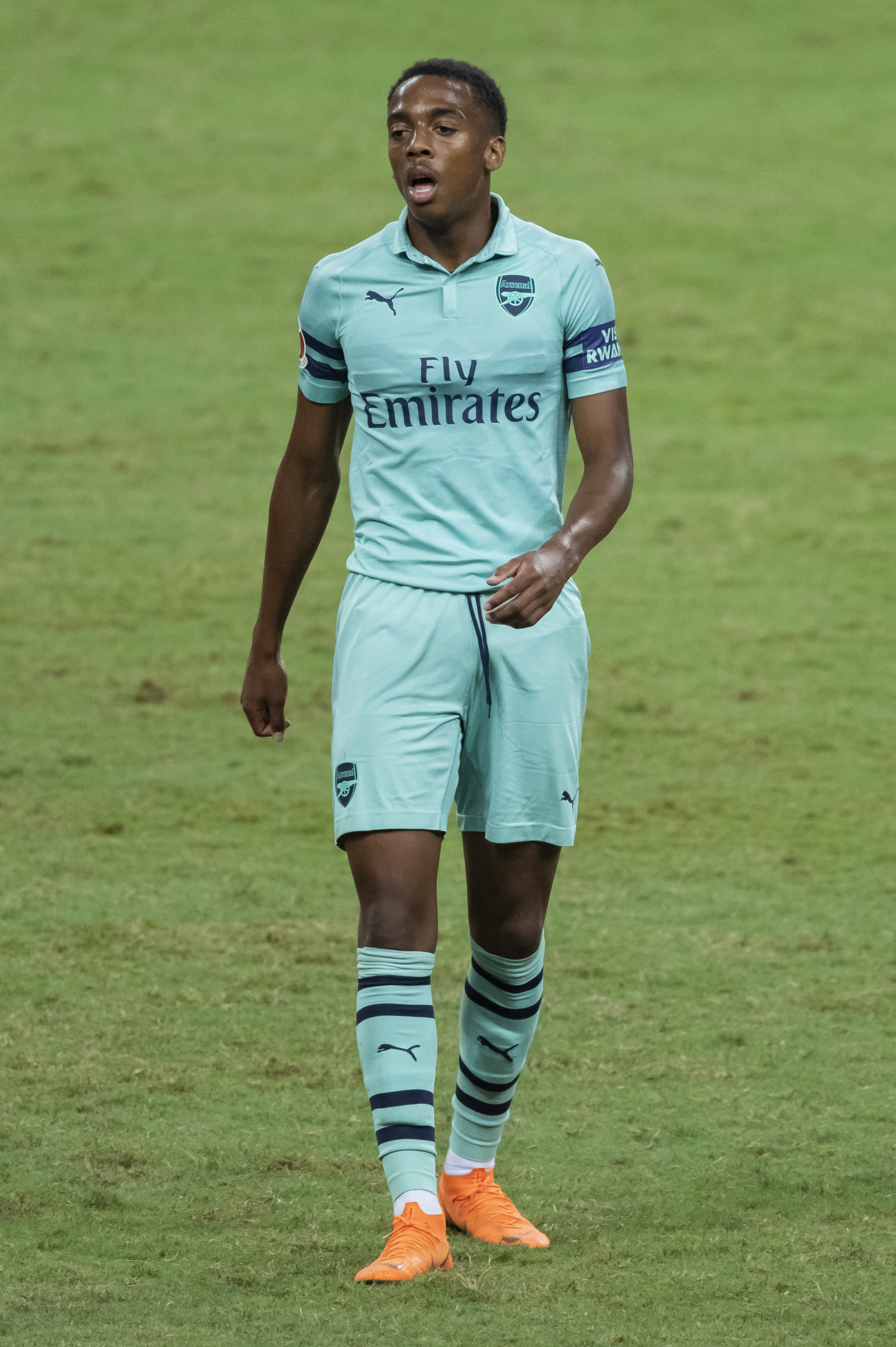
Willock in 2018

For their last pre-season game, Arsenal played their second Mind Series match, this time away to Tottenham Hotspur on 8 August, with Ben White joining fellow new signing Albert Sambi Lokonga in the starting lineup. After both teams came close to scoring on several occasions, Tottenham broke the deadlock in the 79th minute, as Son Heung-min finishing off a cross from Serge Aurier for the game's solitary goal. By losing both of the matches, Arsenal finished at the bottom of the tournament, while Chelsea beat Tottenham for the inaugural title on goals scored.

After being loaned to fellow Premier League side Newcastle United at the end of last season's winter transfer window, Joe Willock had scored eight goals in 14 league appearances, and manager Steve Bruce was keen on bringing him back. As a result, on 13 August, Arsenal announced the transfer of the academy graduate from the first team to Newcastle United on a six-year deal worth at least £20 million.

That same day, Arsenal opened the new Premier League season and headed to the Brentford Community Stadium in west London to take on newly promoted Brentford F.C., who were making their Premier League debut. The Gunners began the season without Alexandre Lacazette and captain Pierre-Emerick Aubameyang, who were ruled out a few hours prior to kick-off due to illness, while Ben White and Albert Sambi Lokonga made their competitive debuts for the team. Academy graduate Folarin Balogun was also named to the starting lineup for his Premier League debut. After Bryan Mbeumo hit the post in the 12th minute, Sergi Canós scored the opening goal of the season 10 minutes later. Meanwhile, Arsenal struggled offensively, with Kieran Tierney having their only shot on target in the first half. In the 73rd minute, Christian Nørgaard doubled Brentford's lead, heading in a long throw-in from substitute Mads Bech Sørensen. Despite several close opportunities, Arsenal were unable to find a consolation goal, and as a result, they opened the season with a 2–0 loss.

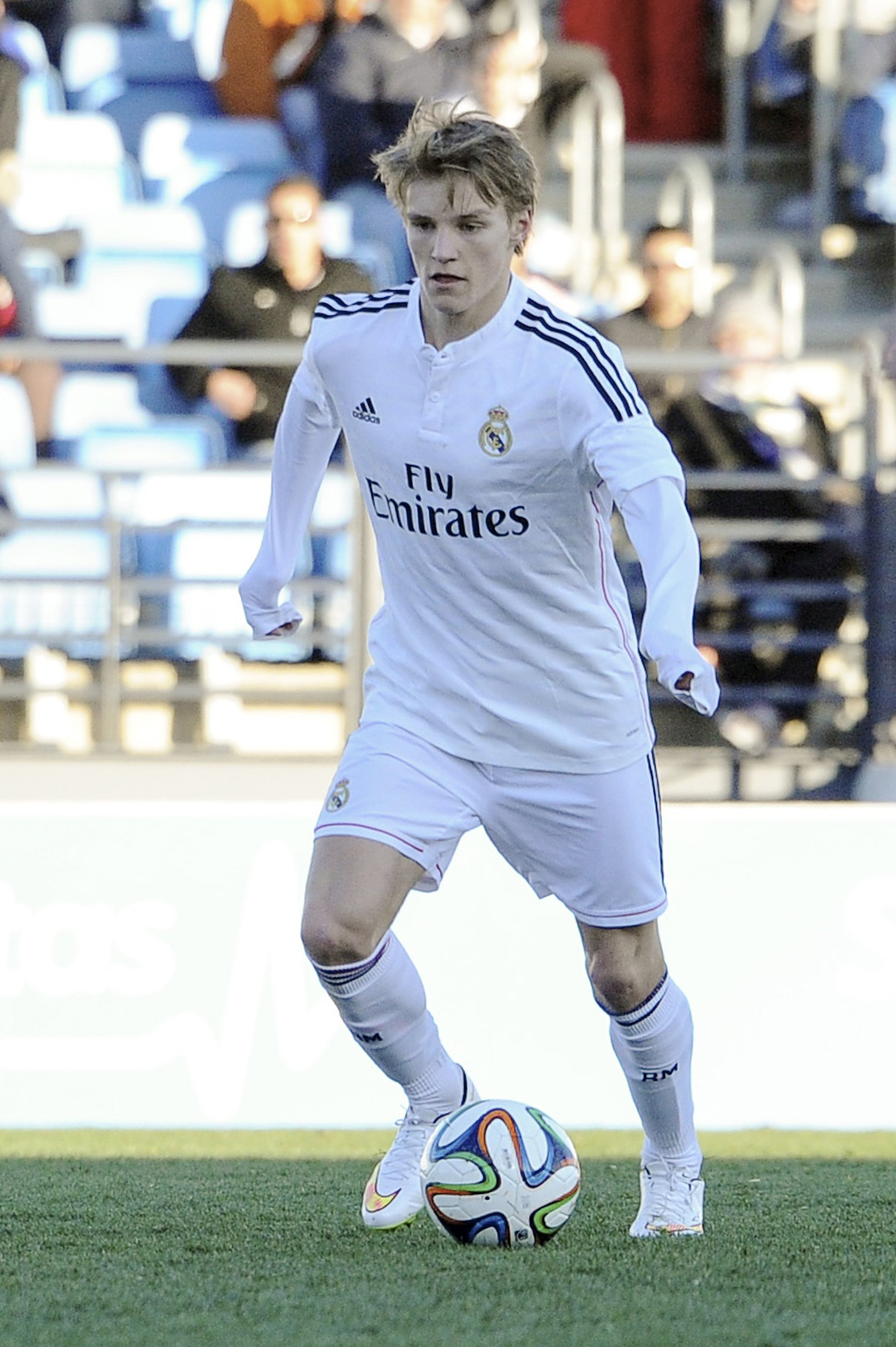
Ødegaard playing for Real Madrid in 2015

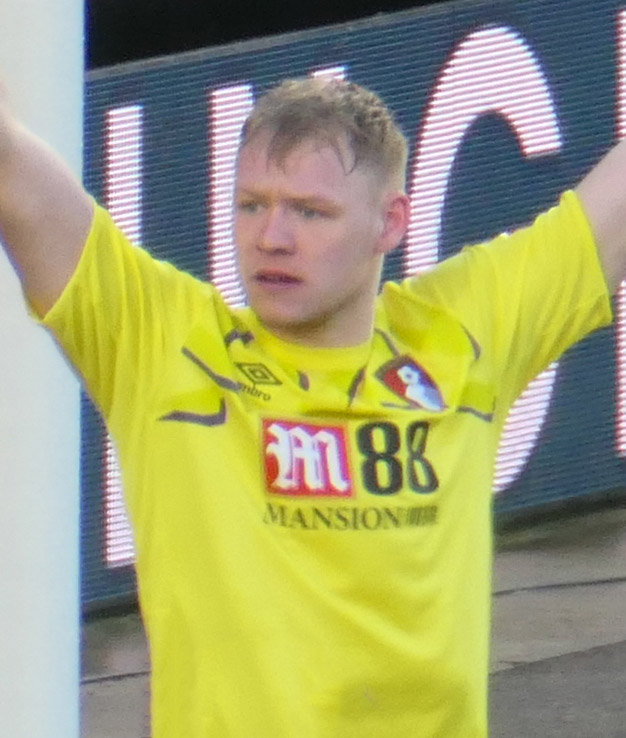
Ramsdale playing for Bournemouth in 2020

On 20 August, Arsenal announced two more signings. Norwegian midfielder Martin Ødegaard, who had been on loan at Arsenal from Real Madrid for the second half of last season, joined on a permanent deal worth £34 million. Meanwhile, English goalkeeper Aaron Ramsdale joined from Sheffield United, which had been relegated from the Premier League last season, in a deal worth up to £30 million.

Arsenal played the home opener of their Premier League campaign on 22 August against cross-town rivals Chelsea. The match was decided by two first-half goals, a tap-in from Romelu Lukaku and a top-corner strike from Reece James. With a second consecutive 2–0 loss to open the season, Arsenal dropped to 19th, just ahead of last-placed Norwich City on goal difference.

On 25 August, ahead of their first Carabao Cup match of the season, Arsenal announced that Lucas Torreira would once again go out on loan, this time to Serie A team ACF Fiorentina for the entire 2021–22 season. Torreira had spent the entirety of last season on loan at La Liga team Atlético Madrid, accumulating 26 appearances and one goal in all competitions; Atlético Madrid went on to win the league.

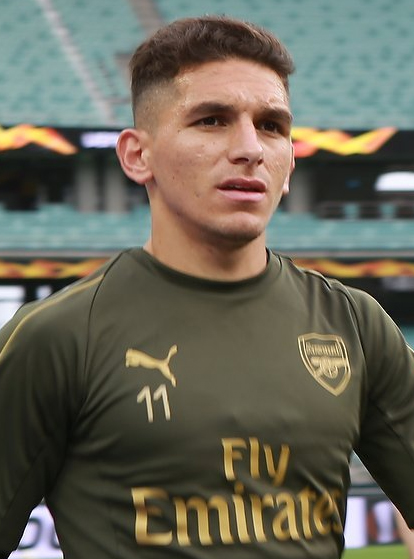
Torreira in 2019

Arsenal entered the Carabao Cup in the second round, facing Championship side West Bromwich Albion away at the Hawthorns. Aaron Ramsdale made his debut and started in goal, while Martin Ødegaard made his first start as a full-fledged Arsenal player. With West Brom opting to field a team of mostly backup and academy players, Arsenal dominated the game from start to end. In the first half, Pierre-Emerick Aubameyang scored two goals before Nicolas Pépé added a third in stoppage time, tapping the ball in after Aubameyang's failed bicycle kick attempt. Bukayo Saka scored five minutes into the second half before Aubameyang completed his hat-trick in the 62nd minute. Substitute Alexandre Lacazette further increased Arsenal's lead seven minutes later, and they won 6–0 to advance to the third round.

On 28 August, Arsenal continued their Premier League campaign, facing Manchester City away at the City of Manchester Stadium. A seventh-minute header from İlkay Gündoğan, which Bernd Leno only managed to punch into the roof of the net, was followed by a close-range goal from Ferran Torres five minutes later. Referee Martin Atkinson showed Granit Xhaka a red card for a dangerous tackle on João Cancelo in the 35th minute. With the man advantage, Manchester City added a third goal shortly before halftime, with Gabriel Jesus redirecting a pass from Jack Grealish into the goal. Manchester City added two more goals in the second half, first with Rodri early in the second half, and then with Torres scoring his second goal of the game by beating Leno to head in a cross from Riyad Mahrez. With the 5–0 result and their third consecutive loss to open their Premier League campaign, Arsenal dropped to 20th, sitting at the bottom of the table and behind both Wolverhampton Wanderers and Norwich City on goal difference and goals scored.

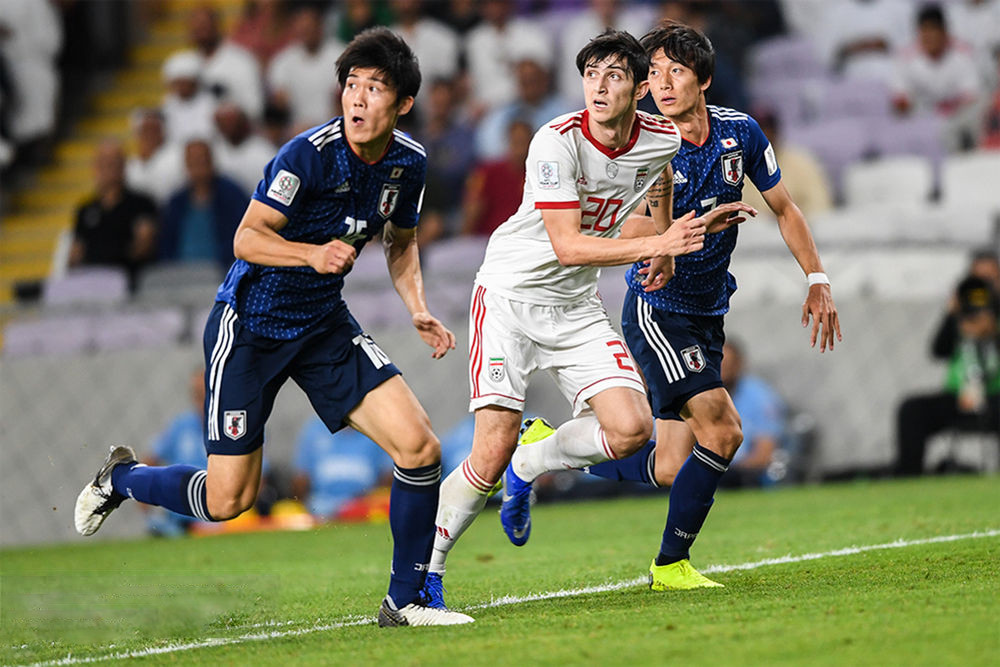
Tomiyasu (foreground) playing for Japan against Iran in the 2019 AFC Asian Cup semi-finals

With the end of the summer transfer window approaching at the end of the month, Arsenal sought to make some final transactions. On 30 August, Willian, who had two years remaining in his contract, left by mutual consent and returned to boyhood club Corinthians in Brazil. On the final day of the transfer window, three first team players were loaned out for the rest of the 2021–22 season: Reiss Nelson joined Feyenoord in the Eredivisie, Rúnar Alex Rúnarsson joined OH Leuven in the Belgian First Division A, and Héctor Bellerín joined Real Betis in La Liga. Meanwhile, the club made one deadline day signing, adding 22-year-old Japanese defender Takehiro Tomiyasu from Serie A side Bologna on a £16 million deal.

=== September ===
Ahead of the international break, Arsenal held a friendly against Brentford, to whom they had lost their first game of the Premier League campaign. The match was held behind closed doors at the Arsenal Training Centre in London Colney. After neither team scored in the first half, Arsenal scored twice early in the second half. The opener, which was scored by Gabriel, returning from injury, was followed by a free kick from Alexandre Lacazette at the hour mark. Cédric scored twice in the final 15 minutes to cap off the 4–0 victory and avenge Arsenal's opening day loss.

After the international break, Arsenal, sitting at the bottom of the Premier League standings, took on 19th placed Norwich City at home on 11 September. New signing Takehiro Tomiyasu made his debut, starting at right back, while Aaron Ramsdale started over Bernd Leno in goal. The match remained scoreless at halftime, though Arsenal came close on several occasions. In the 66th minute, an initial shot by Nicolas Pépé rebounded off the post back to him, and he was immediately tackled by Brandon Williams before he could take a second shot. The ball then ricocheted off several players before Aubameyang tapped it in; a VAR check confirmed that the goal was onside, thus putting Arsenal into the lead and giving them their first Premier League goal of the season. Although Arsenal were unable to score a second goal, the 1–0 win was Arsenal's first of their Premier League campaign, and it elevated them out of the bottom three positions.

Aaron Ramsdale kept his place in goal as Arsenal travelled to Turf Moor to play Burnley on 18 September. After Ashley Westwood clipped Bukayo Saka just outside of the penalty arc, Martin Ødegaard scored the ensuing 25-yard free kick in the 30th minute. In the 68th minute, Matěj Vydra chased down Ben White's back pass to Ramsdale before being closed down and tackled in the box by the latter. Referee Anthony Taylor awarded Burnley a penalty, having originally thought that Ramsdale made contact with Vydra before the ball, but Taylor reversed his decision after taking a second look at the incident on the pitchside VAR monitor. Neither team had many other close shots on goal, but a second consecutive 1–0 victory improved Arsenal to 13th.

In the midweek match, Arsenal faced EFL League One team AFC Wimbledon on 22 September at home in the third round of the Carabao Cup. Manager Mikel Arteta fielded an almost entirely new starting eleven, with Thomas Partey the only holdover from the squad that started against Burnley and Eddie Nketiah making his season debut. Early in the match, Alexandre Lacazette converted a penalty following a foul on Gabriel Martinelli. Late in the second half, Emile Smith Rowe and Nketiah both scored in a three-minute span to secure the 3–0 victory, advancing Arsenal into the fourth round.

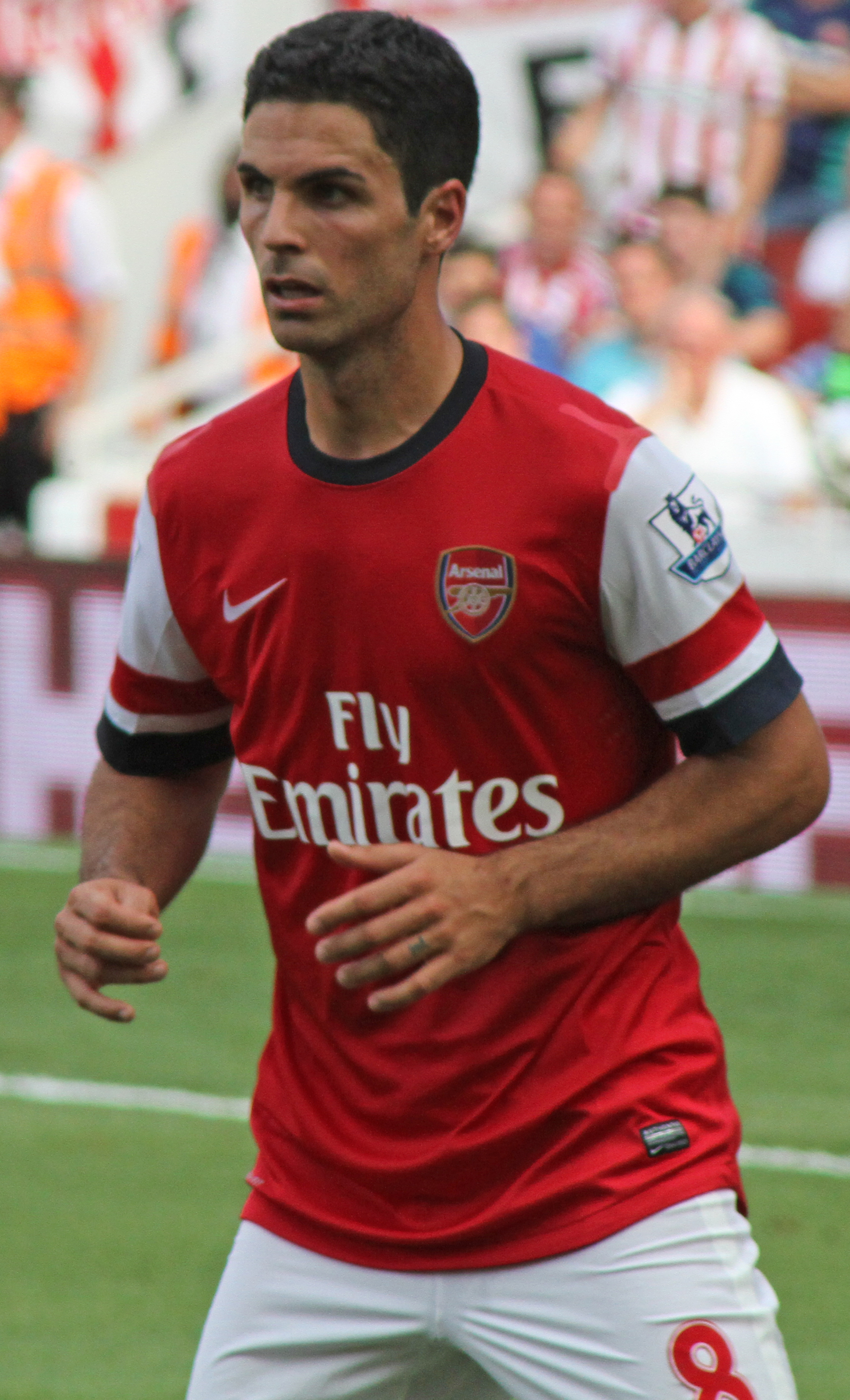
Arteta playing for Arsenal in 2012

The first of two North London derby matches in the Premier League season took place on 25 September, as Arsenal hosted rivals Tottenham Hotspur at the Emirates Stadium. In the 12th minute, Emile Smith Rowe ran in front of Davinson Sánchez to strike in a pass from Bukayo Saka past Hugo Lloris. Arsenal were on the break 15 minutes later, with Smith Rowe passing to Pierre-Emerick Aubameyang for Arsenal's second goal. A third goal came in the 34th minute, as Saka scored off the rebound after Harry Kane had tackled the ball. With just over 10 minutes to go, Son Heung-min finally scored Tottenham's first goal of the match after receiving Sergio Reguilón's cross; Aaron Ramsdale managed to get his left hand to the ball but could not keep it out. In stoppage time, Ramsdale made a leaping save to deny a top-corner shot from Lucas Moura. The 3–1 victory was Arsenal's third in a row after losing their first three matches; meanwhile, Tottenham lost their third game in a row after starting off with three wins and topping the league table. As a result, Arsenal moved up to 10th place, tied on points and goal difference with Tottenham in 11th but ahead due to goals scored.

After guiding Arsenal to wins in all three of their Premier League matches of the month, manager Mikel Arteta was named as the Premier League Manager of the Month over Pep Guardiola (Manchester City), Jürgen Klopp (Liverpool), Graham Potter (Brighton & Hove Albion), and Dean Smith (Aston Villa). This was Arteta's first Manager of the Month award and the first for an Arsenal manager since Arsène Wenger's October 2015 award.

=== October ===
Arsenal's first match of the month was a Premier League match away to Brighton & Hove Albion at the Amex Stadium on 2 October. Albert Sambi Lokonga played in place of Granit Xhaka, who had been ruled out for up to three months after suffering a knee injury in the match against Tottenham Hotspur. In the last few minutes of the match, penalty claims from Brighton for a shove on Shane Duffy by Gabriel were dismissed by VAR. Neither team was able to score all game, though Brighton had the majority of possession as well as 21 shots to Arsenal's eight; of these shots, both teams had two on target.

During the international break, Arsenal hosted fellow London side Queens Park Rangers F.C. from the EFL Championship for a closed-door friendly match at the London Colney training ground on 6 October. Arsenal won 3–2, although the goal scorers for either team were not made publicly known.

On 18 October, Arsenal took on south London side Crystal Palace, managed by former Arsenal player Patrick Vieira. In the eighth minute, a shot from Nicolas Pépé was parried by goalkeeper Vicente Guaita to Pierre-Emerick Aubameyang, who beat James McArthur to tap in the rebound. Crystal Palace equalized early in the second half; after Jordan Ayew dispossessed Thomas Partey, Christian Benteke scored with the rebound. In the 73rd minute, after Conor Gallagher dispossessed Albert Sambi Lokonga and Crystal Palace were on the break, Odsonne Édouard scored off the underside of the crossbar to give Crystal Palace the lead. Arsenal finally drew even in the fifth minute of stoppage time, with a shot from Ben White deflected by Guaita into the path of substitute Alexandre Lacazette for a tap-in, and the game ended 2–2.

In their second Premier League match at home in four days, 12th-placed Arsenal hosted 13th-placed Aston Villa. Left-back Kieran Tierney missed his first Premier League match of the season due to a bruised right ankle, thus giving Nuno Tavares his first Premier League start. Thomas Partey scored a header off Emile Smith Rowe's corner in the 23rd minute for his first Arsenal goal. In first-half stoppage time, referee Craig Pawson consulted the pitchside VAR monitor for Matt Targett's challenge on Alexandre Lacazette and awarded Arsenal a penalty. Former Arsenal goalkeeper Emiliano Martínez saved Pierre-Emerick Aubameyang's initial shot by diving down to his left, but Aubameyang tapped in the rebound. Ten minutes into the second half, Smith Rowe intercepted a pass from John McGinn to Matty Cash, with the ball rebounding to Albert Sambi Lokonga, who passed out wide to Tavares. Tavares's through pass to Aubameyang was then flicked forward to Smith Rowe, who continued his run before eventually firing a shot that deflected off Tyrone Mings and the near post past Martínez. Aston Villa were able to score a consolation goal late in the match when Leon Bailey's run along the edge of the box took the ball into the path of Jacob Ramsey, whose first-time shot found the top corner, but Arsenal hung on for the 3–1 victory.

In the midweek match at home against fellow Premier League club Leeds United on 26 October in the fourth round of the EFL Cup, Bernd Leno made his first start in goal since the previous round's match against AFC Wimbledon a month ago. Neither team scored in the first half, but ten minutes into the second half, Calum Chambers was substituted on in place of an injured Ben White before scoring the opening goal 23 seconds later. After Emile Smith Rowe's corner was headed around the box by Eddie Nketiah and Nicolas Pépé, Chambers beat Jack Harrison to the header; referee Andre Marriner confirmed that the ball had crossed the goal line before Illan Meslier could parry the ball away. On 69 minutes, Arsenal doubled their lead when Nketiah intercepted a backwards header from Leeds captain Liam Cooper to Meslier, guided the ball over Meslier, and slotted in the goal from a narrow angle; this was Nketiah's second goal in as many appearances all season. The 2–0 result advanced Arsenal to the quarter-finals, in which they were drawn at home against League One team Sunderland.

Arsenal finished the month away to Leicester City at the King Power Stadium on 30 October, with the match being decided by two early goals. After Daniel Amartey nearly scored an own goal in the opening minute, Gabriel scored a header, and his first goal of the season, in the fifth minute on a corner from Bukayo Saka, who was making his 100th senior club appearance. In the eighteenth minute, Alexandre Lacazette received a pass from Saka before running into a crowd of Leicester defenders in the box. After Jonny Evans dispossessed Lacazette, Luke Thomas's attempted clearance fell to Emile Smith Rowe, who fired in the second goal. Meanwhile, Aaron Ramsdale made several key saves in a performance that earned him his first Man of the Match as an Arsenal player. Among these was a leaping save near the end of the first half to parry a James Maddison free kick onto the crossbar before Evans's shot from the rebound was cleared off the line by Thomas Partey. The 2–0 victory extended Arsenal's unbeaten streak since the beginning of September to seven matches in the league and nine in all competitions.

Arsenal's successful defensive performances led to Aaron Ramsdale being nominated for the Premier League's Player of the Month Award, which was ultimately won by Liverpool's Mohamed Salah.

=== November ===
On 7 November, Arsenal faced Watford at home. In the seventh minute, Ainsley Maitland-Niles dispossessed Ismaïla Sarr before Alexandre Lacazette's chipped ball was deflected by Ben Foster to Pierre-Emerick Aubameyang. Aubameyang's first touch then took the ball into the path of Bukayo Saka, whose shot went in between Nicolas Nkoulou and a recovering Foster for what seemed to be the opening goal. However, while Saka was in front of Nkoulou, he was also behind of Foster, thus making him offside, and the goal was disallowed. In the 34th minute, referee Kevin Friend awarded Arsenal a penalty after Danny Rose ran into Lacazette, who was trying to control an errant shot from Maitland-Niles. Foster then saved Aubameyang's penalty before recovering the rebound. In the 56th minute, Ben White regained possession of the ball in the Arsenal offensive third and ran forward, evading Juraj Kucka and Joshua King before running into Moussa Sissoko. The ball then fell to Emile Smith Rowe on the edge of the box, who fired into the far corner for what would be the match's only goal, as well as Smith Rowe's third goal in as many Premier League matches. Martin Ødegaard nearly scored a second goal on 73 minutes, but Aubameyang, who had been in an offside position, touched the ball right before it crossed the goal line. In the 89th minute, Kucka, who was already on a yellow card after a foul on Lacazette in the first half, was shown a second yellow card for a foul on Nuno Tavares and was sent off. The 1–0 victory continued Arsenal's rise up the table, as they moved into fifth place.

After the international break, Arsenal travelled to Anfield to take on Liverpool on 20 November. After there was contact between Takehiro Tomiyasu and Sadio Mané as the players were challenging for a header, managers Mikel Arteta and Jürgen Klopp engaged in a verbal dispute on the sideline, for which referee Michael Oliver showed a yellow card to both managers. After Mané and Mohamed Salah were both denied by point-blank saves from Aaron Ramsdale earlier in the game, Mané headed a Trent Alexander-Arnold free kick into the ground and away from Ramsdale for the opening goal in the 39th minute. Early in the second half, Diogo Jota added a second goal for Liverpool after intercepting a backwards pass from Nuno Tavares. In the 73rd minute, a fast break by Liverpool was finished off with Mané centering the ball for Salah to finish from close range. Four minutes later, Takumi Minamino, having just been substituted into the match, slotted home Alexander-Arnold's cross at the back post after just 48 seconds on the pitch. The 4–0 defeat ended Arsenal's unbeaten run at eight matches in the league and 10 in all competitions, although they remained in fifth.

Arsenal rebounded seven days later against bottom-of-the-table Newcastle United and new manager Eddie Howe, who made his debut in the Newcastle dugout; Howe had missed his first match the previous week in quarantine after testing positive for COVID-19. Neither team was able to score in the first half. Jonjo Shelvey came closest for Newcastle in the 30th minute, with his shot parried onto the crossbar by Aaron Ramsdale. Shortly before halftime, after Emile Smith Rowe's header was saved by Martin Dúbravka, Pierre-Emerick Aubameyang missed from close range and kicked the rebound against the outside of the post. In the 56th minute, Bukayo Saka passed back to Smith Rowe, who passed infield to Nuno Tavares; meanwhile, Saka had continued his run forward, and after receiving the ball from Tavares, he fired a low shot into the far corner past Dúbravka for the opening goal. Eight minutes later, Saka was forced off with an injury and was replaced by Gabriel Martinelli. Less than two minutes after coming on, Martinelli finished off a chipped pass from Takehiro Tomiyasu with a first-time volley to bolster Arsenal's lead. Arsenal maintained their 2–0 lead to win the match and stay in fifth place.

=== December ===
Arsenal began December with a midweek fixture at Old Trafford on 2 December away to Manchester United, who were led by caretaker manager Michael Carrick in his last game before interim manager Ralf Rangnick taking over. From a 13th minute corner by Martin Ødegaard, Emile Smith Rowe scored the opening goal from outside of the box, with the assist from Mohamed Elneny after Harry Maguire's initial clearance. Referee Martin Atkinson was initially hesitant to award the goal, as goalkeeper David de Gea lay injured after having his ankle stepped on by his teammate Fred, but the goal was made official after VAR review. Shortly before halftime, Manchester United equalized after Jadon Sancho passed infield to Fred, who squared the ball for Bruno Fernandes to slot it in past Aaron Ramsdale. In the 52nd minute, the home side took the lead as Cristiano Ronaldo finished off Marcus Rashford's low cross. However, Arsenal equalized less than two minutes later; on the right flank, Gabriel Martinelli received Thomas Partey's through pass before firing a low cross into the box for Ødegaard, whose shot curled in past the reach of de Gea. In the 68th minute, Atkinson initially did not award a penalty to Manchester United after Ødegaard's tackle on Fred, but he reversed his decision after consulting the pitchside VAR monitor. Ronaldo scored again, converting the penalty for his 800th career goal and the decisive goal of the match. Despite the 3–2 defeat, Arsenal remained in fifth place for the fourth consecutive matchweek.

Four days later, Arsenal lost their second game in a row after playing away to Everton at Goodison Park, with Granit Xhaka making his return from injury. Minutes before halftime, a free kick from Andros Townsend was headed in by Richarlison, but the goal was disallowed as the latter was found to be offside by VAR. However, in first-half stoppage time, Arsenal scored the opening goal with Martin Ødegaard slotting in a cross from Kieran Tierney with a side-foot volley. In the 56th minute, Richarlison seemed to have scored after receiving a pass from Abdoulaye Doucouré, but he was ruled offside by VAR again. Richarlison was finally able to score in the 80th minute, as he headed in the rebound after a Demarai Gray shot from outside the box hit the crossbar. After Eddie Nketiah missed a close-range header in the 84th minute, Gray scored Everton's second goal of the game in the second of six minutes of stoppage time. Gray's winning strike, which came from a similar location to the one that hit the crossbar, hit off the far post and into the goal, resulting in a 2–1 loss for Arsenal.

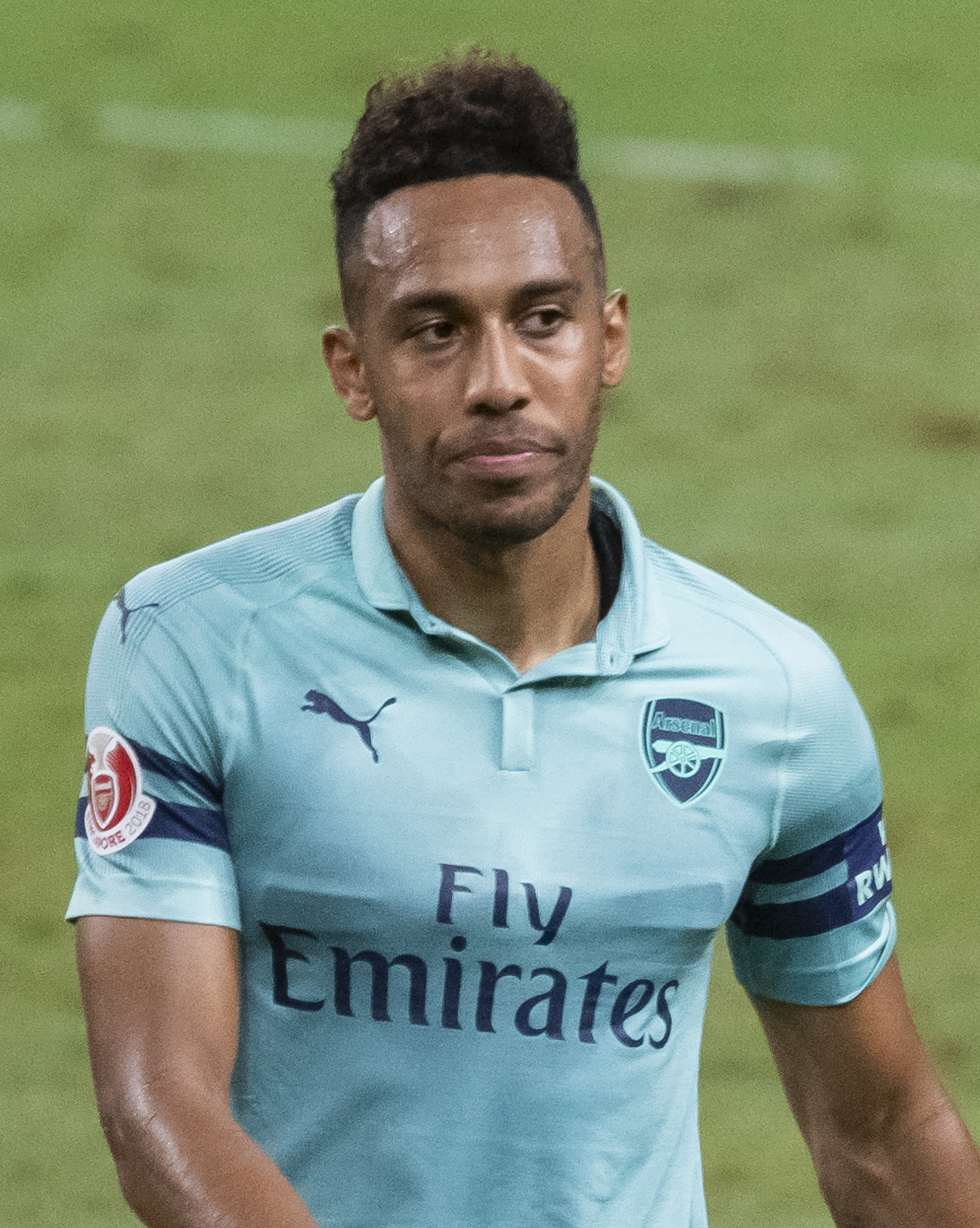
Aubameyang in 2018

On 11 December, Arsenal returned home to the Emirates Stadium for a match against a depleted Southampton side, who were without several key outfield players and both first-choice goalkeepers, with emergency goalkeeper Willy Caballero starting after signing earlier in the week. Meanwhile, Arsenal themselves started without captain Pierre-Emerick Aubameyang, who had reportedly been dropped to the bench for a 'disciplinary breach' by manager Mikel Arteta. In the 21st minute, Arsenal scored first after playing out from the back, as a series of passes down the length of the pitch culminated with Bukayo Saka's low cutback being finished off by Alexandre Lacazette. Six minutes later, Arsenal doubled their lead. After Kieran Tierney received Takehiro Tomiyasu's high pass at the back post, his cross was blocked by Tino Livramento; however, Tierney recovered the rebound and headed the ball to Martin Ødegaard, who scored a header for his third goal in as many matches. After Gabriel had a tap-in disallowed for being offside in the 59th minute, he headed in a corner from Gabriel Martinelli three minutes later. Arsenal continued to apply pressure to Southampton in the search of a fourth goal, but both Martinelli and Saka hit the posts with their shots. Meanwhile, Aaron Ramsdale made six saves to secure the clean sheet and a 3–0 win.

The day before the home match against West Ham United on 15 December, the club announced that Pierre-Emerick Aubameyang would be stripped of the club captaincy due to repeated disciplinary breaches and would not be considered for the West Ham match. Manager Mikel Arteta elaborated that the captaincy would be shared among a "'leadership group' of senior players," including Alexandre Lacazette and Granit Xhaka, the latter of whom had preceded Aubameyang as captain.

After Alexandre Lacazette had assumed the captaincy role against Southampton, manager Mikel Arteta opted to retain him as captain against West Ham. Three minutes into the second half, Lacazette played a through pass to Gabriel Martinelli, who ran past the West Ham defense and curled in the opening goal. In the 67th minute, Vladimír Coufal, who was already on a yellow card after contact with Kieran Tierney in the 11th minute, was sent off after a second yellow card following a tackle on Lacazette in the box. For the same foul, referee Anthony Taylor awarded Arsenal a penalty, which Lacazette took but was saved by Łukasz Fabiański. On 87 minutes, after Takehiro Tomiyasu dispossessed Saïd Benrahma, Bukayo Saka recovered the ball before passing it near the center line to substitute Emile Smith Rowe, who continued his run and scored a second goal for Arsenal. The 2–0 victory moved Arsenal into the top four for the first time all season.

With a rise in positive COVID-19 test results forcing the postponement of the other five matches scheduled for 18 December, Arsenal's match away to an injury-stricken Leeds United at Elland Road was the only remaining Premier League fixture that day. In the 16th minute, after Alexandre Lacazette dispossessed Adam Forshaw in the box, Gabriel Martinelli recovered the loose ball and fired it in first time for the opening goal; this goal was Arsenal's 7,000th scored in the top flight of English football. Twelve minutes later, Granit Xhaka intercepted a pass from Stuart Dallas intended for Mateusz Klich near midfield and played a through pass to Martinelli, who scored to double Arsenal's lead. Three minutes from halftime, Bukayo Saka scored the third goal after his shot deflected off Klich's foot and past Illan Meslier. Notably, Arsenal's 11 shots on target in the first half were the most in the first half of all Premier League matches since the 2003–04 season (also the season of the Invincibles), when Opta began recording such statistics. After Ben White's tackle on Joe Gelhardt, referee Andre Marriner awarded Leeds a penalty, which Raphinha converted in the 75th minute. Substitute Emile Smith Rowe capped off the match by finishing off a pass from Martin Ødegaard to give Arsenal a 4–1 win.

On 21 December, Arsenal hosted League One side Sunderland in the EFL Cup quarter-finals, with Nicolas Pépé making his 100th appearance for Arsenal. Cédric's corner in the 17th minute was headed towards goal by Rob Holding, only for Lee Burge to parry the ball into the path of Eddie Nketiah, who continued his three-match run of scoring in the EFL Cup and put in the tap-in from close range. In the 27th minute, Pépé received a cutback from Cédric and fired a shot, which was deflected by Callum Doyle into the roof of the net to double Arsenal's lead. However, Sunderland scored four minutes later, as Nathan Broadhead received a through pass from Elliot Embleton and lifted the ball over an onrushing Bernd Leno into the goal. Four minutes into the second half, Nketiah scored his second goal, stepping in front of Doyle to redirect a low cross from Nuno Tavares. In the 58th minute, Nketiah completed his hat trick, beating Tom Flanagan to a pass from Pépé and scoring with a backheel finish. In second half stoppage time, Pépé once again provided the assist, this time to Charlie Patino, who had been substituted on ten minutes prior for his senior team debut and slid the ball in past Burge. The 5–1 result advanced Arsenal to the semi-finals for the first time since the 2017–18 edition, while Nketiah's hat trick made him the joint top goalscorer with Brentford's Marcus Forss on five goals.

Arsenal then headed to Carrow Road for a Boxing Day match against Norwich City. Bukayo Saka scored the opening goal in the sixth minute after receiving a pass from Martin Ødegaard and shooting through the legs of Brandon Williams. Arsenal's second goal was also assisted by Ødegaard, as he found Kieran Tierney on the left flank, who ran into the box and fired a low shot across goal just before halftime. In the 67th minute, Saka scored again after receiving a pass from Alexandre Lacazette and beating Williams one-on-one before shooting from the edge of the box. Ozan Kabak tripped Lacazette as the latter was receiving a pass from Emile Smith Rowe, prompting referee Graham Scott to award Arsenal a penalty in the 84th minute, which Lacazette then converted. In second half stoppage time, substitute Nicolas Pépé's pass across the box deflected off Kabak to Smith Rowe, who finished at the back post for his third goal in as many matches, all of which have come as a substitute. The 5–0 win meant that Arsenal ended the year on a four-match win streak.

Arsenal's performances in December led to several Premier League monthly award nominations. Alexandre Lacazette's goal to finish off a 'flowing' team move against Southampton was nominated for Goal of the Month, while manager Mikel Arteta was nominated for Manager of the Month. Additionally, both Martin Ødegaard and Gabriel Martinelli were nominated for Player of the Month. Though the latter two awards were ultimately won by Manchester City's Pep Guardiola and Raheem Sterling, respectively, Lacazette's goal was named the Goal of the Month.

=== January ===
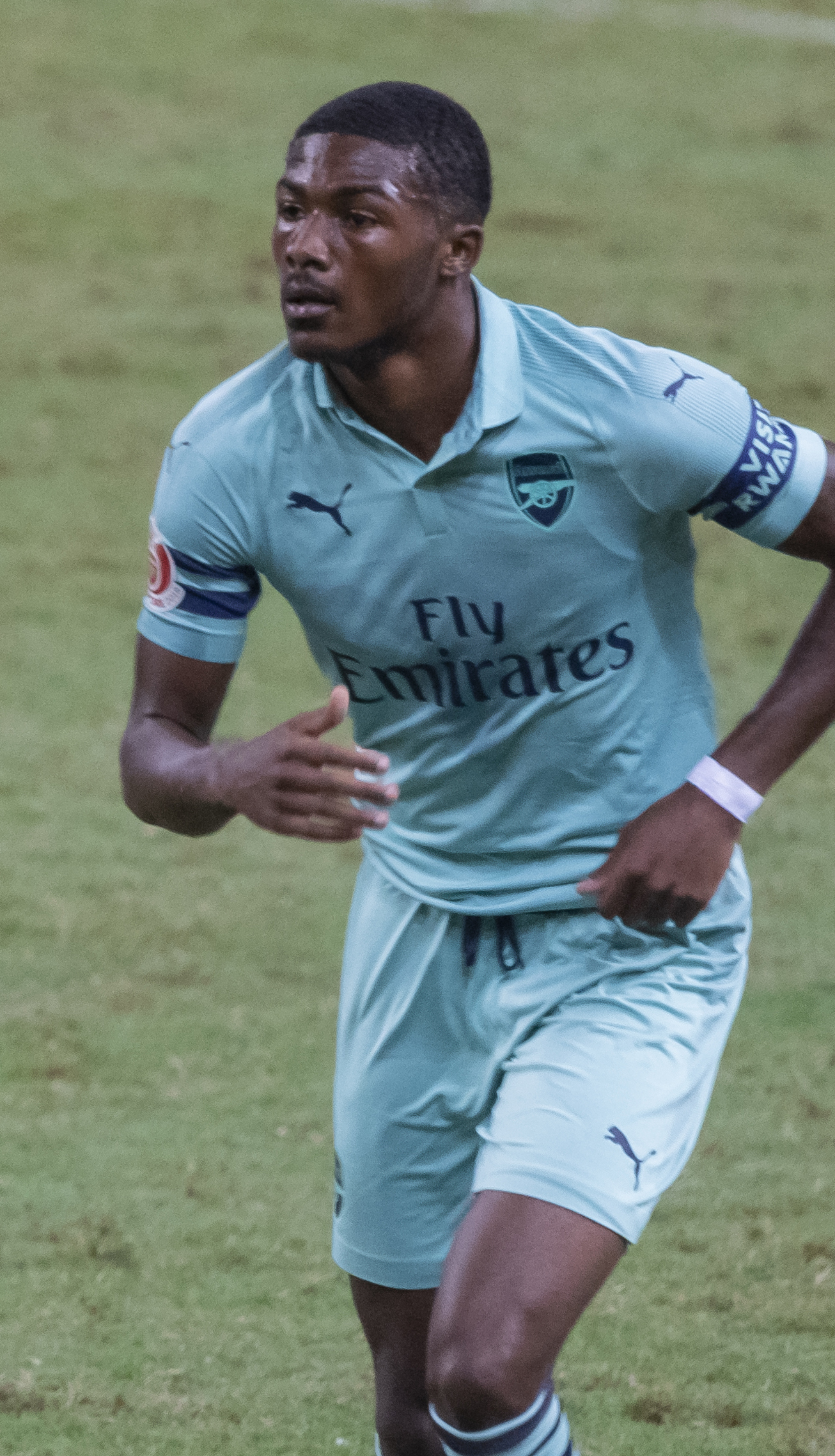
Maitland-Niles in 2018

In the first Premier League fixture of 2022, Arsenal hosted Manchester City at the Emirates Stadium on New Year's Day. Dutch assistant manager Albert Stuivenberg filled in for manager Mikel Arteta, who had tested positive for COVID-19 on 29 December and was forced to miss the match. An Arsenal penalty call in the 10th minute after contact between Martin Ødegaard and Ederson was dismissed by VAR. However, Arsenal took the lead after the half-hour mark when Kieran Tierney found Bukayo Saka in the box, who slotted the ball in as Alexandre Lacazette screened off Nathan Aké. Manchester City equalized when Riyad Mahrez converted a 57th-minute penalty, which had been awarded by referee Stuart Attwell after he deemed Granit Xhaka to have committed a foul on Bernardo Silva. Immediately following the restart, Aké made a goal line clearance on Aymeric Laporte's header to prevent the own goal before Gabriel Martinelli missed the follow-up just wide of the top corner. Less than a minute later, Attwell sent off Gabriel after the latter picked up a second yellow card for a foul on Gabriel Jesus; Attwell had shown him his first yellow card following the Mahrez penalty for dissent. With Manchester City having the man advantage, Rodri scored the winning goal in stoppage time after Laporte's initial shot had been blocked by Ben White, giving the visitors a 2–1 win.

On 5 January, it was announced that the first leg of the EFL Cup semi-finals against Liverpool, which was to be held the following day, was postponed to 13 January due to a COVID-19 outbreak among Liverpool's players and staff, with the second leg to be played a week later. This also led a change in the home team order, with Liverpool now hosting the first leg and Arsenal hosting the second leg.

Ahead of the Africa Cup of Nations, five players were called up by their respective countries; these were Mohamed Elneny (Egypt), Pierre-Emerick Aubameyang (Gabon), Thomas Partey (Ghana), and Nicolas Pépé (Ivory Coast), with academy player Omar Rekik also being called up for Tunisia.

Ahead of the FA Cup third-round match against EFL Championship club Nottingham Forest on 9 January, the club announced the release of a one-off, all-white fourth kit that would be worn during the match. The kit, which is not commercially available and will be "awarded to individuals who are making a positive difference in the community," is part of a campaign to raise awareness about knife crime and youth violence, which contributed to the highest number of teenage murders in a year in London since records began.

On 8 January, Ainsley Maitland-Niles joined Serie A club Roma on loan until the end of the season.

Arsenal's FA Cup campaign ended after just one match, as Nottingham Forest won 1–0 at the City Ground due to an 83rd-minute goal from Lewis Grabban, who finished a cross from Ryan Yates. Meanwhile, Arsenal struggled offensively all game and registered no shots on target despite dominating the time of possession. Additionally, in a rare first-half, non-injury substitution, manager Mikel Arteta sent on Kieran Tierney in place of a 'struggling' Nuno Tavares in the 35th minute. This was the first time since the 2017–18 edition that Arsenal were knocked out in the third round, which also came at the hands of Nottingham Forest.

Four days later, Arsenal travelled to Anfield for the first leg of the EFL Cup semi-finals against Liverpool. An injury to Cédric early in the match forced a substitution in the 11th minute, with Calum Chambers replacing him at right-back. Moments later, Arsenal nearly conceded the opening goal, as Jordan Henderson charged down and blocked a long kick from Aaron Ramsdale, but the deflection went wide of the open goal and resulted in a Liverpool corner. In the 24th minute, Granit Xhaka was sent off by referee Michael Oliver for a high boot and a denial of a clear goal-scoring opportunity, as the former attempted to intercept a long pass from Andrew Robertson to Diogo Jota. The red card meant that Xhaka would miss Arsenal's next two matches. It also prompted Arteta to make another early substitution, with centre-back Rob Holding replacing striker Eddie Nketiah to provide defensive cover. Despite playing with only 10 players for the rest of the match, Arsenal held Liverpool to a 0–0 draw, with Takumi Minamino shooting over an open goal in the closing minutes and missing Liverpool's other best scoring chance.

On 15 January, the Premier League accepted Arsenal's request to postpone the match against Tottenham Hotspur, which would have been held the following day, due to an insufficient amount of available players in the Arsenal squad as a result of COVID-19, existing and recent injuries, and players away with their countries at the Africa Cup of Nations.

On 18 January, Sead Kolašinac left the club by mutual consent and signed with Ligue 1 club Olympique de Marseille, joining up with Arsenal loanees Matteo Guendouzi and William Saliba. Two days later, Pablo Marí was loaned out to Serie A club Udinese until the end of the season.

That same day, in the second leg of the EFL Cup semi-finals, Arsenal were knocked out of the competition at home 2–0 by Liverpool, thanks to a brace from Diogo Jota. Both sides came close to scoring early in the match, with Alexandre Lacazette's fifth-minute free kick hitting the crossbar and Joël Matip's tap-in disallowed for offside minutes later, before Jota scored the opener in the 17th minute. After Liverpool came close with Ibrahima Konaté's header from a Trent Alexander-Arnold corner hitting the post early in the second half, they finally scored a second goal as Jota received a long pass from Alexander-Arnold and chipped the ball over an onrushing Aaron Ramsdale. To make matters worse for Arsenal, 74th-minute substitute Thomas Partey, who had just returned from international duty after Ghana's early elimination from the Africa Cup of Nations, received a second yellow card for a late tackle on Fabinho and was sent off in the closing minutes of the game, having received his first yellow card for a foul on Neco Williams minutes earlier.

Arsenal returned to Premier League competition on 23 January at home against Burnley. However, despite Arsenal having three times as much possession as Burnley and dominating shots and corners, neither team was able to break the deadlock and the match finished 0–0, which ended Arsenal's month-long spell in fourth place and dropped them to sixth.

The club continued their exodus of players in the winter transfer window, as Calum Chambers joined fellow Premier League club Aston Villa on a permanent transfer announced on 27 January.

On the final day of that transfer window, Arsenal made their first and only first-team acquisition, signing 23-year-old American centre-back Auston Trusty from Major League Soccer club Colorado Rapids, although Trusty will stay with the Rapids on loan until 17 July 2022. The following day, it was announced that former captain Pierre-Emerick Aubameyang, who had not been selected for any match squads since the loss to Everton in early December, had left the club by mutual consent, with it being announced later that he had joined La Liga club Barcelona.

=== February ===
After the international break, Arsenal travelled to Molineux to face Wolverhampton Wanderers on 10 February. In the 25th minute, after a half-clearance from a Gabriel Martinelli corner, both Alexandre Lacazette and José Sá went for the ball and missed, with Gabriel scoring the tap-in for the game's only goal. In the 69th minute, referee Michael Oliver showed Martinelli two yellow cards in quick succession, amounting to a red card and dismissal; the first was for shoving Daniel Podence and preventing a quick throw-in, and the second was for chasing him down and fouling him again. Despite being reduced to 10 players, Arsenal maintained their lead and won 1–0.

On 19 February, Arsenal hosted Brentford, to whom they had lost the season opener. Neither club scored in the first half, but three minutes into the second half, Emile Smith Rowe broke the deadlock with his low curling shot past David Raya. In the 79th minute, Arsenal were on the break, and Bukayo Saka finished off a pass from Thomas Partey with a curling strike that ricocheted in off the far post. However, Brentford scoring a consolation goal in stoppage time, with a scramble in the box following a Saman Ghoddos free kick resulting in Christian Norgaard's close-range strike, which was confirmed after a VAR check for offside. There was not enough time for Brentford to seek an equalising goal, so Arsenal won 2–1.

Arsenal continued to make up their games in hand and played the reverse fixture against Wolverhampton Wanderers at home on 25 February; the match had originally been scheduled for 28 December 2021 but was postponed due to a lack of available players in the Wolves squad as a result of numerous injuries and positive COVID-19 test results. Wolves scored first, with Hwang Hee-chan intercepting a back pass from Gabriel to Aaron Ramsdale and scoring in the 10th minute. They maintained their lead for most of the match, until Arsenal equalised in the 82nd minute. Substitute Eddie Nketiah received Martin Ødegaard's lofted pass and cut it back for fellow substitute Nicolas Pépé, who spun around and scored with his stronger left foot. Five minutes into stoppage time, Alexandre Lacazette received a pass from Pépé and shot towards goal, with the strike being diverted into the top corner off José Sá's glove, giving Arsenal another 2–1 win.

=== March ===
Arsenal went to Vicarage Road on 6 March to face Watford. Less than 20 seconds into the match, Emmanuel Dennis scored but the goal was ruled offside. In the fifth minute, Martin Ødegaard slotted the ball past Ben Foster after receiving a pass from Bukayo Saka. Watford levelled the score six minutes later with a bicycle kick from Cucho Hernández. At the half-hour mark, Alexandre Lacazette returned a pass to Saka, who struck into the top corner. In the 52nd minute, Lacazette provided another assist, setting the ball for Gabriel Martinelli's strike. A late goal from Moussa Sissoko reduced Watford's deficit, but Arsenal held on for a 3–2 victory and moved back into the top four.

On 14 March, Arsenal faced Leicester City at home. The Gunners opened the scoring just after the tenth minute. A corner by Gabriel Martinelli was met by the head of Thomas Partey at the near-post. Partey could have had a brace just seven minutes later, when a deflected shot by Granit Xhaka dropped to the Ghanaian, who saw his shot from the edge of the box rattle off the Leicester upright. Leicester nearly found an equaliser in the 34th minute, when a cross by Marc Albrighton was headed towards goal by Barnes. The header from just outside the six-yard box was met by a strong right palm from goalkeeper Aaron Ramsdale. In the 54th minute, Arsenal had a penalty shout when Thomas Partey's header was glanced by the hand of defender Çağlar Söyüncü. After a lengthy VAR check, referee Anthony Taylor awarded the Gunners a penalty. The resulting spot-kick was converted by Alexandre Lacazette. Thereby doubling Arsenal's lead in the 59th minute and also marking Alexandre Lacazette's 200th senior career goal. The result brought Arsenal back into fourth, leapfrogging Manchester United.

Arsenal welcomed Liverpool to the Emirates Stadium on 17 March. The Gunner's fought valiantly in the first half, limiting Liverpool's dominant attacking players to speculative half-chances. However, failing to capitalize on their own chances. The momentum swung Liverpool's way in the second-half, with Sadio Mané netting a goal which was immediately chalked off for offside within two minutes of the half. Arsenal could have broken the deadlock themselves, when Martin Ødegaard's shot was saved by goalkeeper Alisson following a misplaced back-pass by Thiago. The opener was finally scored by Diogo Jota in the 54th minute, with his shot beating Aaron Ramsdale at the near-post following a through-ball by Thiago. Liverpool would go on to double their lead eight minutes later, when Roberto Firmino tapped-in from close range via a cross by Andrew Robertson.

=== April ===
Arsenal kicked off the month of April with an away trip to Selhurst Park to face Crystal Palace on 4 April. Goals from Jean-Philippe Mateta and Jordan Ayew before half-time followed by a Wilfried Zaha penalty condemned Arsenal to a 3–0 defeat. Next, Arsenal hosted Brighton on 9 April. Brighton ended up with a two-goal lead thanks to goals from Leandro Trossard and Enock Mwepu. An 89th-minute goal from Martin Ødegaard came too late, as Arsenal ended up losing 1–2 to the visitors. Arsenal's losing streak increased to three consecutive matches after losing 1–0 to Southampton at St Mary's Stadium on 16 April, with the contest's sole goal coming from Jan Bednarek in the 44th minute. Arsenal finally ended their losing streak on 20 April with a 4–2 away win at Stamford Bridge against Chelsea; Arsenal's goals came via a brace from Eddie Nketiah, and one each from Emile Smith Rowe and Bukayo Saka. Arsenal finished off the month by facing Manchester United at home on 23 April. An early goal from Tavares and a 31st-minute penalty conversion by Saka gave Arsenal a quick two goal lead, before Cristiano Ronaldo put United back in the game in the 34th minute. Granit Xhaka scored in the 70th minute to seal a 3–1 win for Arsenal to end April with back-to-back victories.

=== May ===
Arsenal started the final month of the season traveling to the London Stadium to face West Ham United on 1 May. Rob Holding and Gabriel scored for Arsenal either side of a West Ham equaliser from Jarrod Bowen to secure a 2–1 victory for the Gunners, which extended their win streak to three. Next, Arsenal hosted Leeds United on 8 May. Eddie Nketiah scored a brace within 10 minutes, and despite a 66th-minute goal from Diego Llorente, Arsenal held on for a 2–1 win, extending their win streak to four matches. Arsenal then faced Spurs at the Tottenham Hotspur Stadium on 12 May. Arsenal's winning streak was snapped, as a brace from Harry Kane and a goal from Son Heung-min gave Tottenham a 3–0 win. Hoping to bounce back, Arsenal visited St James' Park on 16 May to face Newcastle United. Both of the match's goals would come in the second half, as a 56th-minute opener from Callum Wilson followed by an 85th-minute strike by Bruno Guimarães gave Newcastle a 2–0 victory and saw Arsenal fall below Tottenham in the table on the penultimate matchday. Arsenal's final match of the season was at home against Everton. Going into the match, Arsenal not only had to win, but Spurs also had to lose for Arsenal to qualify for next season's Champions League. Arsenal beat Everton in a 5–1 rout, but due to Spurs also winning their match, the Gunners qualified for the Europa League instead, finishing the season in fifth place with 69 points.

== Club ==
=== Kits ===
Supplier: Adidas / Sponsor: Emirates / Sleeve sponsor: Visit Rwanda

Home	Home alt. 1	Home alt. 2	Away/Goalkeeper 4	Third	Third alt. 1	Goalkeeper^{1}	Goalkeeper ^{2}	Goalkeeper ^{3}

== First-team coaching staff ==
Position	Name
Manager	(Spain) Mikel Arteta
Assistant coaches	(Netherlands) Albert Stuivenberg
Assistant coaches	(England) Steve Round
Assistant coaches	(Spain) Carlos Cuesta
Assistant coaches	(Spain) Miguel Molina
Goalkeeping coach	(Spain) Iñaki Caña
Set piece coach	(France) Nicolas Jover

== First-team squad ==
As of 22 May 2022

Note: Flags indicate national team as has been defined under FIFA eligibility rules. Players may hold more than one non-FIFA nationality.

No.	Player	Nat.	Position(s)	Date of birth (age)	Year signed	Signed from	Transfer fee	Apps.	Goals
Goalkeepers
1	Bernd Leno	(Germany)	GK	4 March 1992 (aged 30)	2018	(Germany) Bayer Leverkusen	£19.3m	125	0
32	Aaron Ramsdale	(England)	GK	14 May 1998 (aged 24)	2021	(England) Sheffield United	£24m	37	0
33	Arthur Okonkwo	(England)	GK	9 September 2001 (aged 20)	2021	(England) Arsenal Academy	N/A	0	0
Defenders
3	Kieran Tierney (vice-captain)	(Scotland)	LB / LWB	5 June 1997 (aged 25)	2019	(Scotland) Celtic	£25m	86	4
4	Ben White	(England)	CB / RB	8 October 1997 (aged 24)	2021	(England) Brighton & Hove Albion	£50m	37	0
6	Gabriel Magalhães	(Brazil)	CB	19 December 1997 (aged 24)	2020	(France) Lille	£23.14m	70	8
16	Rob Holding	(England)	CB	20 September 1995 (aged 26)	2016	(England) Bolton Wanderers	£2m	138	3
17	Cédric Soares	(Portugal)	RB / RWB	31 August 1991 (aged 30)	2020	(England) Southampton	Free	54	2
18	Takehiro Tomiyasu	(Japan)	RB / CB / LB	5 November 1998 (aged 23)	2021	(Italy) Bologna	£16m	22	0
20	Nuno Tavares	(Portugal)	LB / RB / LWB	26 January 2000 (aged 22)	2021	(Portugal) Benfica	£6.8m	28	1
Midfielders
5	Thomas Partey	(Ghana)	CM / DM	13 June 1993 (aged 29)	2020	(Spain) Atlético Madrid	£45m	59	2
7	Bukayo Saka	(England)	RM / LM / LB	5 September 2001 (aged 20)	2018	(England) Arsenal Academy	N/A	131	23
8	Martin Ødegaard (3rd captain)	(Norway)	AM / CM	17 December 1998 (aged 23)	2021	(Spain) Real Madrid	£34m	60	9
10	Emile Smith Rowe	(England)	AM / LM	28 July 2000 (aged 21)	2018	(England) Arsenal Academy	N/A	82	18
23	Albert Sambi Lokonga	(Belgium)	CM	22 October 1999 (aged 22)	2021	(Belgium) Anderlecht	£17.5m	23	0
25	Mohamed Elneny	(Egypt)	DM	11 July 1992 (aged 29)	2016	(Switzerland) Basel	£5m	145	5
34	Granit Xhaka	(Switzerland)	CM / DM / LB	27 September 1992 (aged 29)	2016	(Germany) Borussia Mönchengladbach	£34.5m	250	14
Forwards
9	Alexandre Lacazette (captain)	(France)	ST	28 May 1991 (aged 31)	2017	(France) Lyon	£46.5m	206	71
19	Nicolas Pépé	(Ivory Coast)	RW	29 May 1995 (aged 27)	2019	(France) Lille	£72m	112	27
30	Eddie Nketiah	(England)	ST	30 May 1999 (aged 23)	2017	(England) Arsenal Academy	N/A	92	23
35	Gabriel Martinelli	(Brazil)	LW / ST	18 June 2001 (aged 21)	2019	(Brazil) Ituano	£6m	84	18
Player(s) on loan during this season
–	William Saliba	(France)	CB	24 March 2001 (aged 21)	2019	(France) Saint-Étienne	£27m	0	0
–	Auston Trusty	(United States)	CB	12 August 1998 (aged 23)	2022	(United States) Colorado Rapids	Undisclosed	0	0
2	Héctor Bellerín	(Spain)	RB / RWB	19 March 1995 (aged 27)	2013	(England) Arsenal Academy	N/A	239	9
11	Lucas Torreira	(Uruguay)	DM	11 February 1996 (aged 26)	2018	(Italy) Sampdoria	£26m	89	4
13	Rúnar Alex Rúnarsson	(Iceland)	GK	18 February 1995 (aged 27)	2020	(France) Dijon	£1.8m	6	0
15	Ainsley Maitland-Niles	(England)	CM / RB / LWB / RWB	29 August 1997 (aged 24)	2014	(England) Arsenal Academy	N/A	131	3
22	Pablo Marí	(Spain)	CB	31 August 1993 (aged 28)	2020	(Brazil) Flamengo	£7.2m	22	1
24	Reiss Nelson	(England)	RW	10 December 1999 (aged 22)	2017	(England) Arsenal Academy	N/A	48	4
26	Folarin Balogun	(England)	ST	3 July 2001 (aged 20)	2020	(England) Arsenal Academy	N/A	10	2
27	Konstantinos Mavropanos	(Greece)	CB	11 December 1997 (aged 24)	2018	(Greece) PAS Giannina	£1.8m	8	0
29	Matteo Guendouzi	(France)	CM / DM	14 April 1999 (aged 23)	2018	(France) Lorient	£7m	82	1
Player(s) transferred out during this season
14	Pierre-Emerick Aubameyang	(Gabon)	ST / LW	18 June 1989 (aged 33)	2018	(Germany) Borussia Dortmund	£56m	163	92
21	Calum Chambers	(England)	CB / DM / RB	20 January 1995 (aged 27)	2014	(England) Southampton	£16m	122	5
31	Sead Kolašinac	(Bosnia and Herzegovina)	LB / LWB	20 June 1993 (aged 29)	2017	(Germany) Schalke 04	Free	118	5

== Transfers ==
=== Transfers in ===
Date	No.	Position	Player	From	Fee	Team	Source
10 July 2021	20	DF	(Portugal) Nuno Tavares	(Portugal) Benfica	£7.2m	First team	
19 July 2021	23	MF	(Belgium) Albert Sambi Lokonga	(Belgium) Anderlecht	£15.75m	First team	
30 July 2021	58	FW	(Denmark) Mika Biereth	(England) Fulham	Free transfer	Academy	
30 July 2021	4	DF	(England) Ben White	(England) Brighton & Hove Albion	£50m	First team	
20 August 2021	8	MF	(Norway) Martin Ødegaard	(Spain) Real Madrid	£30m	First team	
20 August 2021	32	GK	(England) Aaron Ramsdale	(England) Sheffield United	£24m	First team	
31 August 2021	18	DF	(Japan) Takehiro Tomiyasu	(Italy) Bologna	£16m	First team	
28 January 2022		DF	(England) Lino Sousa	(England) West Bromwich Albion	Undisclosed	Academy	
31 January 2022		DF	(United States) Auston Trusty	(United States) Colorado Rapids	Undisclosed	First team	

=== Transfers out ===
Date	No.	Position	Player	To	Fee	Team	Source
21 June 2021	42	FW	(England) Trae Coyle	(Switzerland) Lausanne-Sport	Undisclosed	Academy	
21 June 2021	51	DF	(Republic of Ireland) Mark McGuinness	(Wales) Cardiff City	Undisclosed	Academy	
21 June 2021	52	DF	(England) Zech Medley	(Belgium) KV Oostende	Undisclosed	Academy	
1 July 2021		MF	(England) Aaron Benn	(England) Watford	Free transfer	Academy	
1 July 2021	23	DF	(Brazil) David Luiz	(Brazil) Flamengo	End of contract	First team	
1 July 2021		MF	(England) Adebayo Fapetu	(England) Derby County	Free transfer	Academy	
1 July 2021		DF	(England) Levi Laing	(England) West Ham United	Free transfer	Academy	
1 July 2021		DF	(Nigeria) Joseph Olowu	(England) Doncaster Rovers	Free transfer	Academy	
1 July 2021		DF	(England) Daniel Oyegoke	(England) Brentford	Undisclosed	Academy	
1 July 2021		FW	(England) Luke Plange	(England) Derby County	Free transfer	Academy	
1 July 2021	57	MF	(England) Ben Sheaf	(England) Coventry City	Undisclosed	Academy	
1 July 2021		DF	(England) Jason Sraha	(England) Barnsley	Free transfer	Academy	
7 July 2021		FW	(England) Kieran Petrie	(Wales) Swansea City	Free transfer	Academy	
10 August 2021	40	DF	(England) Tolaji Bola	(England) Rotherham United	Undisclosed	Academy	
13 August 2021	28	MF	(England) Joe Willock	(England) Newcastle United	£25m	First team	
30 August 2021	12	FW	(Brazil) Willian	(Brazil) Corinthians	Free transfer	First team	
17 January 2022	52	GK	(North Macedonia) Dejan Iliev	(Slovakia) AS Trenčín	Contract terminated	Academy	
18 January 2022	31	DF	(Bosnia and Herzegovina) Sead Kolašinac	(France) Marseille	Free transfer	First team	
27 January 2022	21	DF	(England) Calum Chambers	(England) Aston Villa	Free transfer	First team	
31 January 2022	71	FW	(England) Amani Richards	(England) Leicester City	Undisclosed	Academy	
1 February 2022	14	FW	(Gabon) Pierre-Emerick Aubameyang	(Spain) Barcelona	Contract terminated	First team	

=== Loans out ===
Date	No.	Position	Player	To	Until	Team	Source
24 June 2021	27	DF	(Greece) Konstantinos Mavropanos	(Germany) VfB Stuttgart	End of season	First team	
1 July 2021	39	DF	(Northern Ireland) Daniel Ballard	(England) Millwall	End of season	Academy	
5 July 2021	67	MF	(England) Matt Smith	(England) Doncaster Rovers	End of season	Academy	
6 July 2021	29	MF	(France) Matteo Guendouzi	(France) Marseille	End of season	First team	
15 July 2021	4	DF	(France) William Saliba	(France) Marseille	End of season	First team	
26 July 2021	60	FW	(Sweden) Nikolaj Möller	(Germany) Viktoria Köln	3 January 2022	Academy	
26 July 2021	52	GK	(North Macedonia) Dejan Iliev	(Slovakia) Sereď	17 January 2022	Academy	(Note: On 17 January 2022, Iliev's contract was terminated by mutual consent.)
29 July 2021	53	FW	(England) Tyreece John-Jules	(England) Blackpool	17 January 2022	Academy	
2 August 2021	43	DF	(England) Harry Clarke	(Scotland) Ross County	3 January 2022	Academy	
3 August 2021	68	GK	(England) Tom Smith	(England) Welling United	End of season	Academy	
10 August 2021	64	DF	(England) Jordi Osei-Tutu	(England) Nottingham Forest	5 January 2022	Academy	
25 August 2021	11	MF	(Uruguay) Lucas Torreira	(Italy) Fiorentina	End of season	First team	
30 August 2021	38	MF	(England) Miguel Azeez	(England) Portsmouth	17 January 2022	Academy	
31 August 2021	2	DF	(Spain) Héctor Bellerín	(Spain) Real Betis	End of season	First team	
31 August 2021	46	DF	(England) Jonathan Dinzeyi	(England) Carlisle United	3 January 2022	Academy	
31 August 2021	24	FW	(England) Reiss Nelson	(Netherlands) Feyenoord	End of season	First team	
31 August 2021	13	GK	(Iceland) Rúnar Alex Rúnarsson	(Belgium) OH Leuven	End of season	First team	
5 January 2022	43	DF	(England) Harry Clarke	(Scotland) Hibernian	End of 2022–23 season	Academy	
8 January 2022	15	MF	(England) Ainsley Maitland-Niles	(Italy) Roma	End of season	First team	
12 January 2022	26	FW	(United States) Folarin Balogun	(England) Middlesbrough	End of season	Academy	
18 January 2022	86	DF	(England) Brooke Norton-Cuffy	(England) Lincoln City	End of season	Academy	
20 January 2022	22	CB	(Spain) Pablo Marí	(Italy) Udinese	End of season	First team	
24 January 2022	49	GK	(Estonia) Karl Hein	(England) Reading	End of season	Academy	
25 January 2022	53	FW	(England) Tyreece John-Jules	(England) Sheffield Wednesday	End of season	Academy	
28 January 2022	37	DF	(England) Ryan Alebiosu	(England) Crewe Alexandra	End of season	Academy	
31 January 2022	36	MF	(England) Tim Akinola	(Scotland) Dundee United	End of season	Academy	
31 January 2022	60	FW	(Sweden) Nikolaj Möller	(Netherlands) Den Bosch	End of season	Academy	
31 January 2022	64	DF	(England) Jordi Osei-Tutu	(England) Rotherham United	End of season	Academy	
31 January 2022		DF	(United States) Auston Trusty	(United States) Colorado Rapids	17 July 2022	First team	(Note: Trusty signed from the Colorado Rapids but will stay with the MLS club on loan until 17 July 2022.)
7 February 2022	57	MF	(Republic of Ireland) Jordan McEneff	(Republic of Ireland) Shelbourne	End of season	Academy	

== Friendlies ==
On 16 April 2021, Arsenal announced that they would participate in a pre-season fixture against defending Scottish Professional Football League champions Rangers on 17 July at the Ibrox Stadium, in order to celebrate Rangers' 150th anniversary. This forms part of a training camp in Scotland, with another friendly being played against Hibernian four days earlier.

13 July 2021 Friendly	Hibernian	2–1	Arsenal	Edinburgh
18:00	Boyle 21'; Porteous (yellow card) 66'; MacKay 69'	Report	Pépé (penalty missed) 73'; Smith Rowe 82'	Stadium: Easter Road; Referee: Don Robertson (Scotland)

17 July 2021 Friendly	Rangers	2–2	Arsenal	Glasgow
14:00	Balogun 14'; Itten 75'	Report	Marí (yellow card) 12'; Tavares 23'; Nketiah 83'	Stadium: Ibrox Stadium; Referee: Bobby Madden (Scotland)

24 July 2021 Friendly	Arsenal	4–1	Millwall	London Colney
14:00	Chambers 17'; Lacazette 59'; Pépé 65'; Balogun 73'	Report	A. Mitchell 89'	Stadium: Arsenal Training Centre; Attendance: 0 (Behind-closed-doors)

28 July 2021 Friendly	Arsenal	4–1	Watford	London Colney
13:00	Nketiah 16'; Lacazette 70' (pen.); Tierney 77'; Azeez 86'	Report	Zinckernagel 34'	Stadium: Arsenal Training Centre; Attendance: 0 (Behind-closed-doors)

2 September 2021 Friendly	Arsenal	4–0	Brentford	London Colney
12:00	Gabriel 46'; Lacazette 60'; Cédric 76' 89'	Report		Stadium: Arsenal Training Centre; Attendance: 0 (Behind-closed-doors)

6 October 2021 Friendly	Arsenal	3–2	Queen's Park Rangers	London Colney
12:00				Stadium: Arsenal Training Centre; Attendance: 0 (Behind-closed-doors)

30 March 2022 Friendly	Arsenal	4–1	Brentford B	London Colney
12:00	Lacazette 21', 47', 57'; Holding 60'	Report	Jeanvier 72'	Stadium: Arsenal Training Centre; Attendance: 0 (Behind-closed-doors)

=== Florida Cup ===
Arsenal confirmed they will travel to the United States to compete in the seventh edition of the Florida Cup in Orlando, Florida. On July 20, Arsenal withdrew from the Cup, citing "a small number of positive COVID tests."

25 July 2021 Florida Cup	Arsenal	Cancelled	Inter Milan	Orlando, United States
EDT				Stadium: Camping World Stadium
Note: Match cancelled due to Arsenal withdrawing from Florida Cup due to positive COVID tests.

28 July 2021 Florida Cup	Arsenal	Cancelled	Everton or Millonarios	Orlando, United States
EDT				Stadium: Camping World Stadium
Note: Match cancelled due to Arsenal withdrawing from Florida Cup due to positive COVID-19 tests.

=== Mind Series ===
A series with Chelsea and Tottenham Hotspur was confirmed for the start of August 2021, to be called 'The Mind Series'.

1 August 2021 Friendly	Arsenal	1–2	Chelsea	Holloway
15:00 BST	Xhaka 69'; Tavares (yellow card) 86'	Report	Havertz 26'; Kovačić (yellow card) 42'; Zappacosta (yellow card) 54'; Abraham 72'	Stadium: Emirates Stadium; Attendance: 20,000; Referee: Andre Marriner

8 August 2021 Friendly	Tottenham Hotspur	1–0	Arsenal	Tottenham
14:00 BST	Alli (yellow card) 33'; Skipp (yellow card) 45+1'; Reguilón (yellow card) 74'; Son 79'	Report	Tierney (yellow card) 56'; Xhaka (yellow card) 57'	Stadium: Tottenham Hotspur Stadium; Referee: David Coote

== Competitions ==
=== Overview ===
Competition	First match	Last match	Starting round	Final position	Record							
Competition	First match	Last match	Starting round	Final position	Pld	W	D	L	GF	GA	GD	Win %
Premier League	13 August 2021	22 May 2022	Matchday 1	5th	38	22	3	13	61	48	+13	57.89
FA Cup	9 January 2022		Third round	Third round	1	0	0	1	0	1	−1	0.00
EFL Cup	25 August 2021	20 January 2022	Second round	Semi-finals	6	4	1	1	16	3	+13	66.67
Total					45	26	4	15	77	52	+25	57.78

Source: Competitions

=== Premier League ===
==== League table ====
Pos	Team	Pld	W	D	L	GF	GA	GD	Pts	Qualification or relegation
3	Chelsea	38	21	11	6	76	33	+43	74	Qualification for the Champions League group stage
4	Tottenham Hotspur	38	22	5	11	69	40	+29	71	Qualification for the Champions League group stage
5	Arsenal	38	22	3	13	61	48	+13	69	Qualification for the Europa League group stage (Note: Since the winners of the 2021–22 FA Cup and the 2021–22 EFL Cup, Liverpool, qualified for the Champions League, the spot given to the FA Cup winners (Europa League group stage) was passed to the sixth-placed team and the spot given to the League Cup winners (Europa Conference League play-off round) was passed to the seventh-placed team.)
6	Manchester United	38	16	10	12	57	57	0	58	Qualification for the Europa League group stage
7	West Ham United	38	16	8	14	60	51	+9	56	Qualification for the Europa Conference League play-off round

Source: Premier League
Rules for classification: 1) Points; 2) Goal difference; 3) Goals scored; 4) If the champions, relegated teams or qualified teams for UEFA competitions cannot be determined by rules 1 to 3, rules 4.1 to 4.3 are applied – 4.1) Points gained in head-to-head record between such teams; 4.2) Away goals scored in head-to-head record between such teams; 4.3) Play-offs

==== Results summary ====
Overall								Home						Away					
Pld	W	D	L	GF	GA	GD	Pts	W	D	L	GF	GA	GD	W	D	L	GF	GA	GD
38	22	3	13	61	48	+13	69	13	2	4	35	17	+18	9	1	9	26	31	−5

Source: Premier League

==== Results by round ====
Round	1	2	3	4	5	6	7	8	9	10	11	12	13	14	15	16	17	18	19	20	21	22	23	24	25	26	27	28	29	30	31	32	33	34	35	36	37	38
Ground	A	H	A	H	A	H	A	H	H	A	H	A	H	A	A	H	H	A	A	H	H	A	H	H	A	H	H	A	A	H	A	A	H	A	H	A	A	H
Result	L	L	L	W	W	W	D	D	W	W	W	L	W	L	L	W	W	W	W	L	D	W	W	W	W	W	L	W	L	L	L	W	W	W	W	L	L	W
Position	17	19	20	16	13	10	11	12	10	6	5	5	5	5	7	6	4	4	4	4	6	5	6	5	4	4	4	4	5	5	6	5	4	4	4	4	5	5
Points	0	0	0	3	6	9	10	11	14	17	20	20	23	23	23	26	29	32	35	35	36	39	42	45	48	51	51	54	54	54	54	57	60	63	66	66	66	69

Source: Premier League
A = Away; H = Home; W = Win; D = Draw; L = Loss

==== Matches ====
The league fixtures were announced on 16 June 2021.

13 August 2021 1	Brentford	2–0	Arsenal	Brentford
20:00 BST	Canós 22'; Nørgaard 73'	Report		Stadium: Brentford Community Stadium; Attendance: 16,479; Referee: Michael Oliver

22 August 2021 2	Arsenal	0–2	Chelsea	Holloway
16:30 BST	Marí (yellow card) 34'; Holding (yellow card) 45'; Sambi Lokonga (yellow card) 67'	Report	Lukaku 15'; James 35'	Stadium: Emirates Stadium; Attendance: 58,729; Referee: Paul Tierney

28 August 2021 3	Manchester City	5–0	Arsenal	Manchester
12:30 BST	Gündoğan 7'; Torres 12', 84'; Gabriel Jesus 43'; Rodri 53', (yellow card) 67'	Report	Cédric (yellow card) 24'; Kolašinac (yellow card) 28'; Xhaka (red card) 35'	Stadium: City of Manchester Stadium; Attendance: 52,276; Referee: Martin Atkinson

11 September 2021 4	Arsenal	1–0	Norwich City	Holloway
15:00 BST	Aubameyang 66'; White (yellow card) 88'	Report	Aarons (yellow card) 42'; Hanley (yellow card) 48'	Stadium: Emirates Stadium; Attendance: 59,337; Referee: Michael Oliver

18 September 2021 5	Burnley	0–1	Arsenal	Burnley
15:00 BST	Barnes (yellow card) 19'; Westwood (yellow card) 29'	Report	Ødegaard 30'; Tavares (yellow card) 90+2'	Stadium: Turf Moor; Attendance: 18,072; Referee: Anthony Taylor

26 September 2021 6	Arsenal	3–1	Tottenham Hotspur	Holloway
16:30 BST	Smith Rowe 12'; Aubameyang 27'; Saka 34'; Ødegaard (yellow card) 89'; Sambi Lokonga (yellow card) 90+1'	Report	Skipp (yellow card) 67'; Son 79'	Stadium: Emirates Stadium; Attendance: 59,919; Referee: Craig Pawson

2 October 2021 7	Brighton & Hove Albion	0–0	Arsenal	Falmer
17:30 BST	Maupay (yellow card) 74'; Veltman (yellow card) 82'	Report	Partey (yellow card) 90+1'	Stadium: Falmer Stadium; Attendance: 31,266; Referee: Jonathan Moss

18 October 2021 8	Arsenal	2–2	Crystal Palace	Holloway
20:00 BST	Aubameyang 8'; Saka (yellow card) 42'; Lacazette 90+5'	Report	McArthur (yellow card) 42'; Benteke 50'; Édouard 73'	Stadium: Emirates Stadium; Attendance: 59,475; Referee: Mike Dean

22 October 2021 9	Arsenal	3–1	Aston Villa	Holloway
20:00 BST	Partey 23'; Sambi Lokonga (yellow card) 45+1'; Aubameyang (penalty missed) 45+5', 45+6', (yellow card) 66'; Smith Rowe 56'	Report	Watkins (yellow card) 2'; Mings (yellow card) 27'; McGinn (yellow card) 32'; Targett (yellow card) 60'; Ramsey 82'; Douglas Luiz (yellow card) 84'	Stadium: Emirates Stadium; Attendance: 59,496; Referee: Craig Pawson

30 October 2021 10	Leicester City	0–2	Arsenal	Leicester
12:30 BST	Evans (yellow card) 68'; Vardy (yellow card) 75'	Report	Gabriel 5'; Smith Rowe 18'	Stadium: King Power Stadium; Attendance: 32,209; Referee: Michael Oliver

7 November 2021 11	Arsenal	1–0	Watford	Holloway
14:00 GMT	Sambi Lokonga (yellow card) 20'; Tomiyasu (yellow card) 30'; Aubameyang (penalty missed) 36', (yellow card) 52'; Smith Rowe 56'; Gabriel (yellow card) 80'	Report	King (yellow card) 10'; Kucka (yellow card) 31' (yellow-red card) 89'; Sissoko (yellow card) 54'	Stadium: Emirates Stadium; Attendance: 59,833; Referee: Kevin Friend

20 November 2021 12	Liverpool	4–0	Arsenal	Liverpool
17:30 GMT	Mané 39', (yellow card) 44'; Jota 52'; Fabinho (yellow card) 70'; Salah 73'; Minamino 77'	Report		Stadium: Anfield; Attendance: 53,092; Referee: Michael Oliver

27 November 2021 13	Arsenal	2–0	Newcastle United	Holloway
12:30 GMT	Saka 56'; Martinelli 66'; Aubameyang (yellow card) 76'	Report	Ritchie (yellow card) 44'; Krafth (yellow card) 48'; Lascelles (yellow card) 63'	Stadium: Emirates Stadium; Attendance: 59,886; Referee: Stuart Attwell

2 December 2021 14	Manchester United	3–2	Arsenal	Manchester
20:15 GMT	Fernandes 44'; McTominay (yellow card) 45+1'; Ronaldo 52', 70' (pen.)	Report	Smith Rowe 13'; Ødegaard 54'	Stadium: Old Trafford; Attendance: 73,123; Referee: Martin Atkinson

6 December 2021 15	Everton	2–1	Arsenal	Walton
20:00 GMT	Godfrey (yellow card) 51'; Richarlison 79'; Gray 90+2', (yellow card) 90+3'	Report	Ødegaard 45+2', (yellow card) 75'; Xhaka (yellow card) 63'	Stadium: Goodison Park; Attendance: 38,906; Referee: Mike Dean

11 December 2021 16	Arsenal	3–0	Southampton	Holloway
15:00 GMT	Gabriel (yellow card) 3', (goal) 62'; Saka (yellow card) 17'; Lacazette 21'; Ødegaard 27'	Report		Stadium: Emirates Stadium; Attendance: 59,653; Referee: Jarred Gillett

15 December 2021 17	Arsenal	2–0	West Ham United	Holloway
20:00 GMT	Martinelli 48', (yellow card) 58'; Lacazette (penalty missed) 69'; Ramsdale (yellow card) 72'; Smith Rowe 87'	Report	Coufal (yellow card) 11' (yellow-red card) 67'	Stadium: Emirates Stadium; Attendance: 59,777; Referee: Anthony Taylor

18 December 2021 18	Leeds United	1–4	Arsenal	Leeds
17:30 GMT	Gelhardt (yellow card) 52'; Dallas (yellow card) 56'; Raphinha 75' (pen.); Koch (yellow card) 88'	Report	Martinelli 16', 28'; Saka 42'; Smith Rowe 84'; Xhaka (yellow card) 86'	Stadium: Elland Road; Attendance: 36,166; Referee: Andre Marriner

26 December 2021 19	Norwich City	0–5	Arsenal	Norwich
15:00 GMT	Płacheta (yellow card) 41'	Report	Saka 6', 67'; Xhaka (yellow card) 39'; Tierney 44'; Partey (yellow card) 62'; Lacazette 84' (pen.); Smith Rowe 90+1'	Stadium: Carrow Road; Attendance: 26,940; Referee: Graham Scott

1 January 2022 20	Arsenal	1–2	Manchester City	Holloway
12:30 GMT	Saka 31', (yellow card) 64'; Xhaka (yellow card) 55'; Gabriel (yellow card) 58' (yellow-red card) 59'; Holding (yellow card) 68'	Report	Mahrez 57' (pen.); Rodri 90+3', (yellow card) 90+4'; Silva (yellow card) 90+5'	Stadium: Emirates Stadium; Attendance: 59,757; Referee: Stuart Attwell

23 January 2022 21	Arsenal	0–0	Burnley	Holloway
14:00 GMT		Report	Westwood (yellow card) 25'; Brownhill (yellow card) 30'	Stadium: Emirates Stadium; Attendance: 59,255; Referee: David Coote

10 February 2022 22	Wolverhampton Wanderers	0–1	Arsenal	Wolverhampton
19:45 GMT	Saïss (yellow card) 36'; Neves (yellow card) 60'	Report	Gabriel 25', (yellow card) 61'; Partey (yellow card) 33'; Xhaka (yellow card) 45+1'; Martinelli (yellow card) 69' (yellow-red card) 69'	Stadium: Molineux; Attendance: 31,523; Referee: Michael Oliver

19 February 2022 23	Arsenal	2–1	Brentford	Holloway
15:00 GMT	Smith Rowe 48'; Saka 79'; Gabriel (yellow card) 86'	Report	Jansson (yellow card) 81'; Nørgaard 90+3'	Stadium: Emirates Stadium; Attendance: 60,015; Referee: Jonathan Moss

24 February 2022 24	Arsenal	2–1	Wolverhampton Wanderers	Holloway
19:45 GMT	Saka (yellow card) 38'; Pépé 82'; Sá 90+5' (o.g.)	Report	Hwang 10'; Jiménez (yellow card) 89'	Stadium: Emirates Stadium; Attendance: 59,888; Referee: Martin Atkinson
Note: The match, originally scheduled for 28 December 2021, was postponed due to an insufficient amount of available players in the Wolves squad as a result of numerous injuries and positive COVID-19 test results.

6 March 2022 25	Watford	2–3	Arsenal	Watford
14:00 GMT	Hernández 11', (yellow card) 90+6'; Sissoko 87'	Report	Ødegaard 5'; Saka 30'; Martinelli 52'; Cédric (yellow card) 58'; Nketiah (yellow card) 90+3'	Stadium: Vicarage Road; Attendance: 21,142; Referee: Craig Pawson

13 March 2022 26	Arsenal	2–0	Leicester City	Holloway
16:30 GMT	Partey 11'; Lacazette 59' (pen.)	Report	Iheanacho (yellow card) 30'; Söyüncü (yellow card) 58'; Daka (yellow card) 80'	Stadium: Emirates Stadium; Attendance: 60,111; Referee: Anthony Taylor

16 March 2022 27	Arsenal	0–2	Liverpool	Holloway
20:15 GMT		Report	Jota 55'; Firmino 62', (yellow card) 63'	Stadium: Emirates Stadium; Attendance: 59,968; Referee: Andre Marriner

19 March 2022 28	Aston Villa	0–1	Arsenal	Aston
12:30 GMT	Ramsey (yellow card) 15'; Mings (yellow card) 33'; McGinn (yellow card) 34'	Report	Saka 30'; Xhaka (yellow card) 45+1'; Cédric (yellow card) 57'; Partey (yellow card) 65'	Stadium: Villa Park; Attendance: 41,956; Referee: Andy Madley

4 April 2022 29	Crystal Palace	3–0	Arsenal	Selhurst, London
20:00 BST	Mateta 16'; Ayew 24'; Zaha 74' (pen.)	Report	Partey (yellow card) 53'; Xhaka (yellow card) 77'	Stadium: Selhurst Park; Attendance: 25,149; Referee: Paul Tierney

9 April 2022 30	Arsenal	1–2	Brighton & Hove Albion	Holloway
15:00 BST	Ødegaard (yellow card) 39', (goal) 89'; Saka (yellow card) 50'; Sambi Lokonga (yellow card) 82'	Report	Trossard 28'; Bissouma (yellow card) 35'; Groß (yellow card) 40'; Caicedo (yellow card) 52'; Mwepu 66'; Sánchez (yellow card) 90+1'	Stadium: Emirates Stadium; Attendance: 60,112; Referee: David Coote

16 April 2022 31	Southampton	1–0	Arsenal	Southampton
15:00 BST	Bednarek 44'; Broja (yellow card) 56'; Long (yellow card) 90+5'	Report	White (yellow card) 90+1'	Stadium: St Mary's Stadium; Attendance: 31,465; Referee: Peter Bankes

20 April 2022 32	Chelsea	2–4	Arsenal	Fulham
19:45 BST	Werner 17'; Azpilicueta 32', (yellow card) 90+2'; Sarr (yellow card) 65'; Mount (yellow card) 85'	Report	Nketiah 13', 57'; Smith Rowe 27'; Gabriel (yellow card) 90+1'; Saka 90+2' (pen.)	Stadium: Stamford Bridge; Attendance: 32,249; Referee: Jonathan Moss

23 April 2022 33	Arsenal	3–1	Manchester United	Holloway
12:30 BST	Tavares 3', (yellow card) 68'; Saka 32' (pen.); Xhaka (yellow card) 67', (goal) 70'; Elneny (yellow card) 80'	Report	Telles (yellow card) 31'; Ronaldo 34', (yellow card) 90+2'; Fernandes (penalty missed) 57', (yellow card) 76'; Lindelöf (yellow card) 82'	Stadium: Emirates Stadium; Attendance: 60,223; Referee: Craig Pawson

1 May 2022 34	West Ham United	1–2	Arsenal	Stratford
16:30 BST	Bowen 45', (yellow card) 52'; Cresswell (yellow card) 90+2'	Report	Holding 38'; Saka (yellow card) 49'; Gabriel 54'; Nketiah (yellow card) 90'	Stadium: London Stadium; Attendance: 59,959; Referee: Mike Dean

8 May 2022 35	Arsenal	2–1	Leeds United	Holloway
14:00 BST	Nketiah 5', 10'; Gabriel (yellow card) 16'; Tomiyasu (yellow card) 64'	Report	Raphinha (yellow card) 27'; Ayling (red card) 27'; Klich (yellow card) 34'; Llorente 66'	Stadium: Emirates Stadium; Attendance: 60,108; Referee: Chris Kavanagh

12 May 2022 36	Tottenham Hotspur	3–0	Arsenal	Tottenham
19:45 BST	Davies (yellow card) 17'; Kane 22' (pen.), 37'; Son Heung-min 47'	Report	Holding (yellow card) 26' (yellow-red card) 33'; Smith Rowe (yellow card) 86'; Ødegaard (yellow card) 88'; Xhaka (yellow card) 90+1'	Stadium: Tottenham Hotspur Stadium; Attendance: 62,027; Referee: Paul Tierney
Note: The match, originally scheduled for 16 January, was postponed due to an insufficient amount of available players in the Arsenal squad as a result of COVID-19, existing and recent injuries, and players away with their countries at the 2021 Africa Cup of Nations.

16 May 2022 37	Newcastle United	2–0	Arsenal	Newcastle upon Tyne
20:00 BST	White 56' (o.g.); Bruno Guimarães 85'	Report	White (yellow card) 8'; Nketiah (yellow card) 46'; Xhaka (yellow card) 90+5'	Stadium: St. James' Park; Attendance: 52,274; Referee: Darren England

22 May 2022 38	Arsenal	5–1	Everton	Holloway
16:00 BST	Martinelli 27' (pen.); Nketiah 31'; Cédric 56'; Gabriel 59'; Ødegaard 82'	Report	Van de Beek 45+3'; Davies (yellow card) 69'	Stadium: Emirates Stadium; Attendance: 60,201; Referee: Andre Marriner

=== FA Cup ===
9 January 2022 Third round	Nottingham Forest	1–0	Arsenal	West Bridgford
17:15 GMT	Zinckernagel (yellow card) 35'; Spence (yellow card) 78'; Grabban 83'	Report	Martinelli (yellow card) 74'	Stadium: City Ground; Attendance: 24,938; Referee: Craig Pawson

=== EFL Cup ===
25 August 2021 Second round	West Bromwich Albion	0–6	Arsenal	West Bromwich
20:00 BST	Castro (yellow card) 2'	Report	Aubameyang 17', 45', 62'; Holding (yellow card) 27'; Kolašinac (yellow card) 39'; Pépé 45+1'; Saka 50'; Lacazette 69'	Stadium: The Hawthorns; Attendance: 17,016; Referee: David Webb

22 September 2021 Third round	Arsenal	3–0	AFC Wimbledon	Holloway
19:45 BST	Lacazette 11' (pen.); Smith Rowe 77'; Nketiah 80'	Report	McCormick (yellow card) 30'; Heneghan (yellow card) 45'	Stadium: Emirates Stadium; Attendance: 56,276; Referee: Jarred Gillett

26 October 2021 Fourth round	Arsenal	2–0	Leeds United	Holloway
19:45 BST	Chambers 55'; Cédric (yellow card) 59'; Nketiah 69'	Report	Roberts (yellow card) 23'	Stadium: Emirates Stadium; Attendance: 59,126; Referee: Andre Marriner

21 December 2021 Quarter-finals	Arsenal	5–1	Sunderland	Holloway
19:45 GMT	Nketiah 17', 49', 58'; Pépé 27'; Balogun (yellow card) 54'; Patino 90+1'	Report	Gooch (yellow card) 20'; Broadhead 31'; Hume (yellow card) 60'; Wright (yellow card) 76'; Doyle (yellow card) 85'	Stadium: Emirates Stadium; Attendance: 59,027; Referee: Robert Jones

13 January 2022 Semi-finals first leg	Liverpool	0–0	Arsenal	Liverpool
19:45 GMT	Robertson (yellow card) 57'	Report	Xhaka (red card) 24'; Gabriel (yellow card) 72'	Stadium: Anfield; Attendance: 52,377; Referee: Michael Oliver

20 January 2022 Semi-finals second leg	Arsenal	0–2 (0–2 agg.)	Liverpool	Holloway
19:45 GMT	Lacazette (yellow card) 44'; Tomiyasu (yellow card) 56'; Partey (yellow card) 87' (yellow-red card) 90'	Report	Jota 19', 77'; Konaté (yellow card) 63'; Jones (yellow card) 82'; Minamino (yellow card) 90+1'	Stadium: Emirates Stadium; Attendance: 59,360; Referee: Martin Atkinson
Note: The match was originally scheduled for 6 January 2022 but was postponed due to a COVID-19 outbreak among Liverpool's players and staff.

== Statistics ==
=== Appearances and goals ===
Players with no appearances not included in the list.

As of 22 May 2022

No.	Pos.	Nat.	Name	Premier League		FA Cup		EFL Cup		Total	
No.	Pos.	Nat.	Name	Apps	Goals	Apps	Goals	Apps	Goals	Apps	Goals
1	GK	(Germany)	Bernd Leno	4	0	1	0	3	0	8	0
3	DF	(Scotland)	Kieran Tierney	22	1	0(1)	0	2	0	24(1)	1
4	DF	(England)	Ben White	32	0	1	0	4	0	37	0
5	MF	(Ghana)	Thomas Partey	23(1)	2	0	0	1(1)	0	24(2)	2
6	DF	(Brazil)	Gabriel Magalhães	35	5	0	0	2(1)	0	37(1)	5
7	MF	(England)	Bukayo Saka	36(2)	11	1	0	3(1)	1	40(3)	12
8	MF	(Norway)	Martin Ødegaard	32(4)	7	1	0	3	0	36(4)	7
9	FW	(France)	Alexandre Lacazette	20(10)	4	0(1)	0	3(2)	2	23(13)	6
10	MF	(England)	Emile Smith Rowe	21(12)	10	0	0	3(1)	1	24(13)	11
16	DF	(England)	Rob Holding	9(6)	1	1	0	4(1)	0	14(7)	1
17	DF	(Portugal)	Cédric Soares	16(5)	1	1	0	4	0	21(5)	1
18	DF	(Japan)	Takehiro Tomiyasu	20(1)	0	0	0	1	0	21(1)	0
19	FW	(Ivory Coast)	Nicolas Pépé	5(15)	1	0	0	3	2	8(15)	3
20	DF	(Portugal)	Nuno Tavares	13(8)	1	1	0	3(2)	0	17(10)	1
23	MF	(Belgium)	Albert Sambi Lokonga	11(6)	0	1	0	3(1)	0	15(7)	0
25	MF	(Egypt)	Mohamed Elneny	8(6)	0	0	0	3	0	11(6)	0
30	FW	(England)	Eddie Nketiah	8(13)	5	1	0	4(1)	5	13(14)	10
32	GK	(England)	Aaron Ramsdale	34	0	0	0	3	0	37	0
34	MF	(Switzerland)	Granit Xhaka	27	1	0	0	2(1)	0	29(1)	1
35	FW	(Brazil)	Gabriel Martinelli	21(8)	6	1	0	4(2)	0	26(10)	6
87	MF	(England)	Charlie Patino	0	0	1	0	0(1)	1	1(1)	1
Player(s) on loan but featured this season
15	MF	(England)	Ainsley Maitland-Niles	2(5)	0	0	0	2(1)	0	4(6)	0
22	DF	(Spain)	Pablo Marí	2	0	0	0	1	0	3	0
24	FW	(England)	Reiss Nelson	0(1)	0	0	0	0	0	0(1)	0
26	FW	(England)	Folarin Balogun	1(1)	0	0	0	1(1)	0	2(2)	0
Player(s) transferred out but featured this season
14	FW	(Gabon)	Pierre-Emerick Aubameyang	12(2)	4	0	0	1	3	13(2)	7
21	DF	(England)	Calum Chambers	2	0	0	0	1(2)	1	3(2)	1
31	DF	(Bosnia and Herzegovina)	Sead Kolašinac	1(1)	0	0(1)	0	2	0	3(2)	0

=== Goalscorers ===
As of 22 May 2022

Rank	No.	Pos.	Nat.	Name	Premier League	FA Cup	EFL Cup	Total
1	7	MF	(England)	Bukayo Saka	11	0	1	12
2	10	MF	(England)	Emile Smith Rowe	10	0	1	11
3	30	FW	(England)	Eddie Nketiah	5	0	5	10
4	8	MF	(Norway)	Martin Ødegaard	7	0	0	7
4	14	FW	(Gabon)	Pierre-Emerick Aubameyang	4	0	3	7
6	9	FW	(France)	Alexandre Lacazette	4	0	2	6
6	35	FW	(Brazil)	Gabriel Martinelli	6	0	0	6
8	6	DF	(Brazil)	Gabriel	5	0	0	5
9	19	FW	(Ivory Coast)	Nicolas Pépé	1	0	2	3
10	5	MF	(Ghana)	Thomas Partey	2	0	0	2
11	3	DF	(Scotland)	Kieran Tierney	1	0	0	1
11	16	DF	(England)	Rob Holding	1	0	0	1
11	17	DF	(Portugal)	Cédric Soares	1	0	0	1
11	20	DF	(Portugal)	Nuno Tavares	1	0	0	1
11	21	DF	(England)	Calum Chambers	0	0	1	1
11	34	MF	(Switzerland)	Granit Xhaka	1	0	0	1
11	87	MF	(England)	Charlie Patino	0	0	1	1
Own goal(s)					1	0	0	1
Total					61	0	16	77

=== Disciplinary record ===
As of 22 May 2022

Rank	No.	Pos.	Nat.	Name	Premier League			FA Cup			EFL Cup			Total		
Rank	No.	Pos.	Nat.	Name	Yellow card	(yellow card) (yellow-red card)	Red card	Yellow card	(yellow card) (yellow-red card)	Red card	Yellow card	(yellow card) (yellow-red card)	Red card	Yellow card	(yellow card) (yellow-red card)	Red card
1	34	MF	(Switzerland)	Granit Xhaka	10	0	1	0	0	0	0	0	1	10	0	2
2	6	DF	(Brazil)	Gabriel	6	1	0	0	0	0	1	0	0	7	1	0
3	5	MF	(Ghana)	Thomas Partey	5	0	0	0	0	0	0	1	0	5	1	0
4	16	DF	(England)	Rob Holding	2	1	0	0	0	0	1	0	0	3	1	0
5	35	FW	(Brazil)	Gabriel Martinelli	1	1	0	1	0	0	0	0	0	2	1	0
6	7	MF	(England)	Bukayo Saka	6	0	0	0	0	0	0	0	0	6	0	0
7	23	MF	(Belgium)	Albert Sambi Lokonga	5	0	0	0	0	0	0	0	0	5	0	0
8	8	MF	(Norway)	Martin Ødegaard	4	0	0	0	0	0	0	0	0	4	0	0
8	17	DF	(Portugal)	Cédric Soares	3	0	0	0	0	0	1	0	0	4	0	0
10	4	DF	(England)	Ben White	3	0	0	0	0	0	0	0	0	3	0	0
10	14	FW	(Gabon)	Pierre-Emerick Aubameyang	3	0	0	0	0	0	0	0	0	3	0	0
10	18	DF	(Japan)	Takehiro Tomiyasu	2	0	0	0	0	0	1	0	0	3	0	0
10	30	FW	(England)	Eddie Nketiah	3	0	0	0	0	0	0	0	0	3	0	0
14	20	DF	(Portugal)	Nuno Tavares	2	0	0	0	0	0	0	0	0	2	0	0
14	31	DF	(Bosnia and Herzegovina)	Sead Kolašinac	1	0	0	0	0	0	1	0	0	2	0	0
16	9	FW	(France)	Alexandre Lacazette	0	0	0	0	0	0	1	0	0	1	0	0
16	10	MF	(England)	Emile Smith Rowe	1	0	0	0	0	0	0	0	0	1	0	0
16	22	DF	(Spain)	Pablo Marí	1	0	0	0	0	0	0	0	0	1	0	0
16	25	MF	(Egypt)	Mohamed Elneny	1	0	0	0	0	0	0	0	0	1	0	0
16	26	FW	(England)	Folarin Balogun	0	0	0	0	0	0	1	0	0	1	0	0
16	32	GK	(England)	Aaron Ramsdale	1	0	0	0	0	0	0	0	0	1	0	0
Totals					60	3	1	1	0	0	7	1	1	68	4	2

=== Clean sheets ===
As of 22 May 2022

Rank	No.	Pos.	Nat.	Name	Premier League	FA Cup	EFL Cup	Total
1	32	GK	(England)	Aaron Ramsdale	12	0	2	14
2	1	GK	(Germany)	Bernd Leno	1	0	2	3
Total					13	0	4	17

== Awards ==
Each club Player of the Month and Goal of the Month award winner was chosen via open-access polls on the club's official website. While the Player of the Month awards only include the men's senior team, the Goal of the Month awards include contenders from both the men's and women's teams.

=== Arsenal Player of the Month award ===
Month	Player	Votes	Source
September	Takehiro Tomiyasu (JPN)	51%	
October	Aaron Ramsdale (ENG)	60%	
November	Aaron Ramsdale (ENG)	42%	
December	Gabriel Martinelli (BRA)	47%	
January	Gabriel Martinelli (BRA)	41%	
February	Thomas Partey (GHA)	49%	
April	Granit Xhaka (SUI)	—	

=== Arsenal Goal of the Month award ===
Month	Player	Competition	Opponent	Votes	Source
September	Martin Ødegaard (NOR)	Premier League	Burnley	28%	
November	Gabriel Martinelli (BRA)	Premier League	Newcastle United	51%	
December	Alexandre Lacazette (FRA)	Premier League	Southampton	37%	
February	Nicolas Pépé (CIV)	Premier League	Wolverhampton Wanderers	47%	
March	Gabriel Martinelli (BRA)	Premier League	Watford	48%	

Note: The October and January Goal of the Month awards were won by Katie McCabe and Beth Mead, respectively, of the women's team.

=== External awards ===
Month	Player or Manager	Award	Source
September	Mikel Arteta (ESP)	Premier League Manager of the Month	
December	Gabriel Martinelli (BRA)	PFA Fans' Premier League Player of the Month	
December	Alexandre Lacazette (FRA)	Premier League Goal of the Month	
March	Mikel Arteta (ESP)	Premier League Manager of the Month	
March	Bukayo Saka (ENG)	PFA Fans' Premier League Player of the Month	

=== Seasonal awards ===
Player or Manager	Award	Source
Bukayo Saka (ENG)	Arsenal Player of the Season	
Granit Xhaka (SUI)	Arsenal Goal of the Season	

== See also ==
- 2021–22 in English football
- List of Arsenal F.C. seasons

== Sources ==
- James, Josh (23 May 2022). "Our 2021/22 season in numbers". Arsenal F.C.
