= Bernd Leno =

German footballer (born 1992)

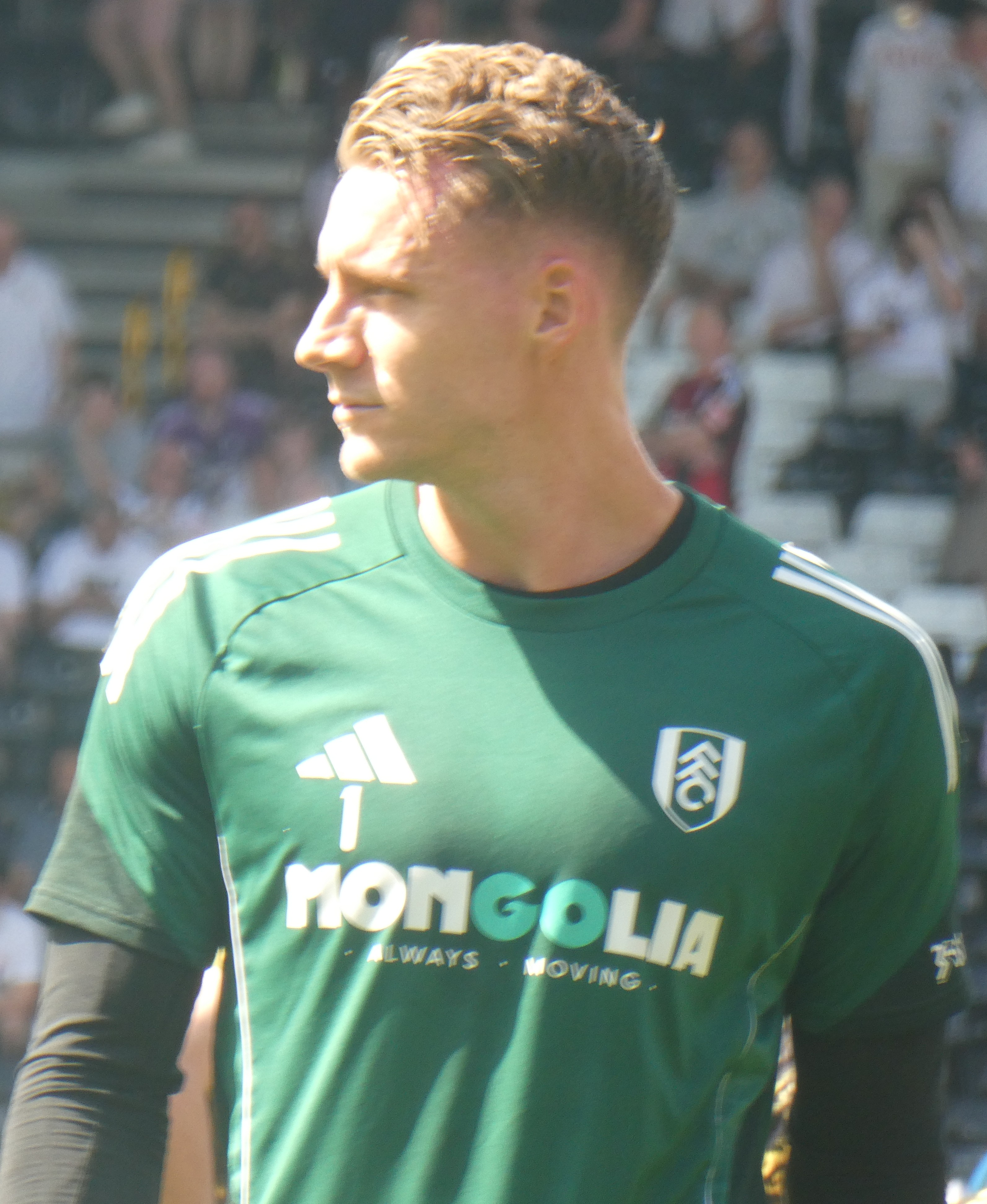
- Leno with Fulham in 2026

Personal information
- Full name: Bernd Leno
- Date of birth: 4 March 1992 (age 34)
- Place of birth: Bietigheim-Bissingen, Germany
- Height: 1.89 m (6 ft 2 in)
- Position: Goalkeeper

Team information
- Current team: Fulham
- Number: 1

Youth career
- 1998–2003: SV Germania Bietigheim
- 2003–2009: VfB Stuttgart

Senior career*
Years	Team	Apps	(Gls)
2009–2011	VfB Stuttgart II	57	(0)
2011	→ Bayer Leverkusen (loan)	16	(0)
2012–2018	Bayer Leverkusen	217	(0)
2018–2022	Arsenal	101	(0)
2022–	Fulham	159	(0)

International career
2008–2009	Germany U17	4	(0)
2009–2010	Germany U18	5	(0)
2010–2011	Germany U19	5	(0)
2012–2015	Germany U21	14	(0)
2016–2021	Germany	9	(0)
Medal record
Men's football
Representing Germany
FIFA Confederations Cup
Winner	2017
UEFA European Under-17 Championship
Winner	2009
- * Club domestic league appearances and goals as of 31 October 2026 (UTC)

Bernd Leno (born 4 March 1992) is a German professional footballer who plays as a goalkeeper for Premier League club Fulham.

== Early and personal life ==
Bernd Leno was born on 4 March 1992 in Bietigheim-Bissingen, Baden-Württemberg. His father is Russian-German.

Leno married his long-time girlfriend, Sophie Christin, in 2020.

== Club career ==
=== VfB Stuttgart ===
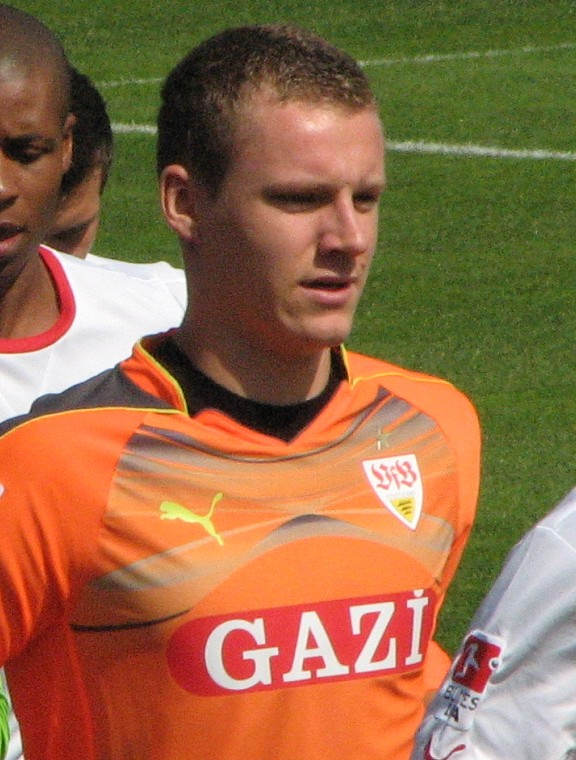
Leno in training with VfB Stuttgart in 2011

Having progressed through the youth set up at VfB Stuttgart, in May 2011, Leno extended his contract until June 2014. By this time he was a regular goalkeeper in the VfB Stuttgart II reserve team who played in the 3. Liga.

=== Bayer Leverkusen ===
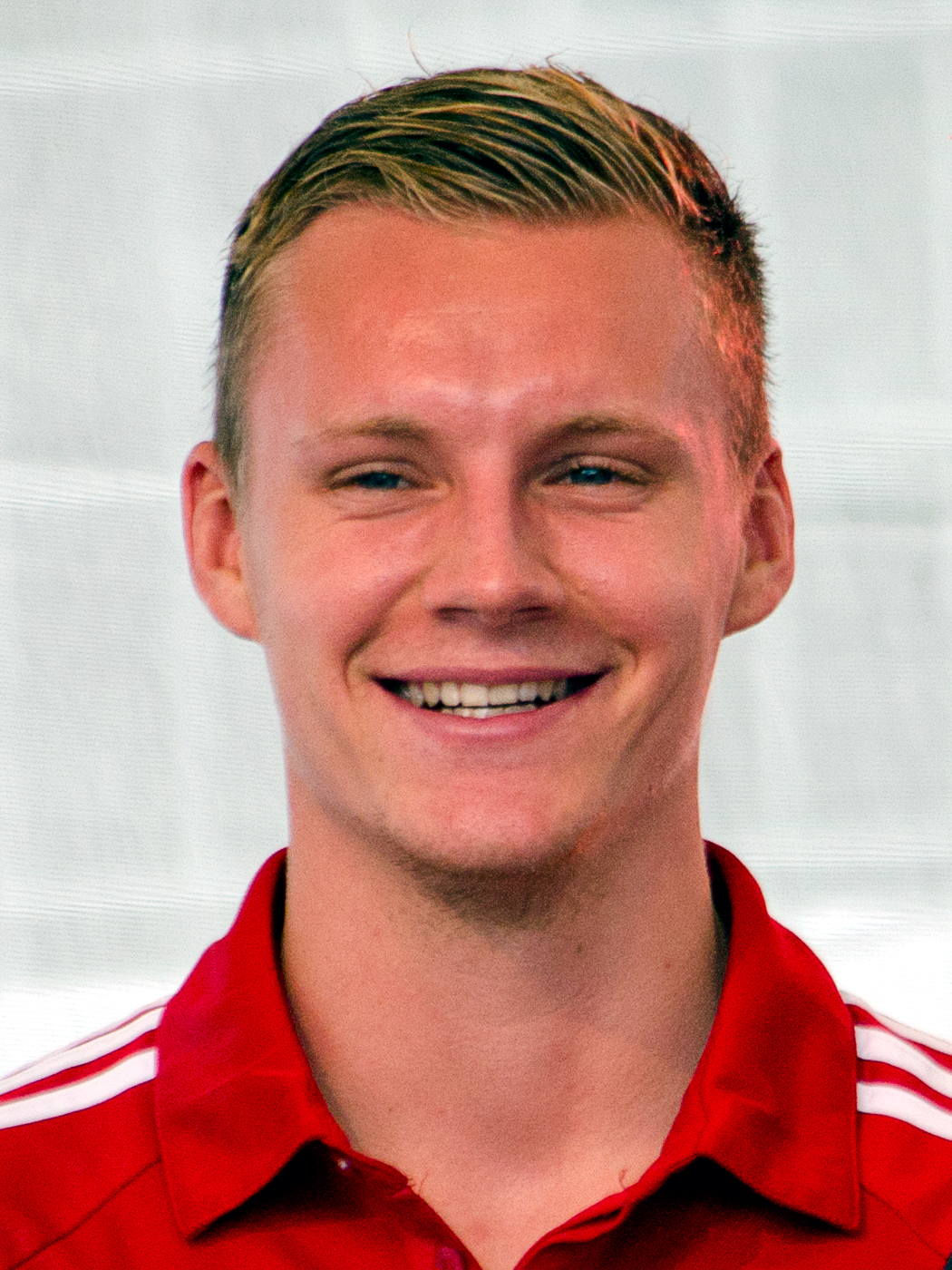
Leno with Bayer Leverkusen in 2014

On 10 August 2011, Bernd Leno was loaned out to Bayer Leverkusen until 31 December 2011. Four days later, Leno made his Bundesliga debut against Werder Bremen. He became, after Dirk Krüssenberg and Heribert Macherey, the third goalkeeper in Bundesliga history to keep a clean sheet in his first three Bundesliga appearances. When he played on 13 September 2011, at the age of 19 years and 193 days, against Chelsea in the 2011–12 UEFA Champions League group stage he became the youngest German goalkeeper to ever to play in a Champions League match.

The transfer was made permanent on 30 November 2011, when Leno received a deal that kept him with Bayer until 2017. Leno became a regular in the first team and after a string of impressive performances, on 8 November 2013, he signed an improved contract to keep him at the club until 2018. He made his 300th appearance for Leverkusen on 14 April 2018 in a 4–1 league win over Eintracht Frankfurt.

=== Arsenal ===
On 19 June 2018, Premier League club Arsenal announced that Leno had signed a five-year contract for a fee of £22.5 million, while pending 'the completion of regulatory processes'.

Leno made his debut for Arsenal in the 4–2 victory over Vorskla Poltava in the Europa League. Leno made his Premier League debut in the 2–0 home victory over Watford, replacing regular goalkeeper Petr Čech, who picked up an injury in the first-half. His performance was praised by head-coach Unai Emery, who said "He is working very well with the goalkeeping coaches. I spoke with him and said the most important thing is when the team needs him to help us, to be prepared. He did that on Wednesday and today also – and against Vorskla. We have three very good goalkeepers. Petr Čech, his performances for us have been very important and his experience. Leno can learn by staying near with Petr Čech every day. I am very happy with him. He has waited for his moment and it's arriving."

Leno was the runner up of the Arsenal Player of the Season Award in the 2019–20 season, commanding 16 per cent of the final vote. On 25 February 2021, he played his 100th match for Arsenal in all competitions in a 3–2 win over Benfica in the Europa League round of 32. Leno was used as a backup in the 2021–22 season after the signing of Aaron Ramsdale, who was selected as the starting goalkeeper.

=== Fulham ===
On 2 August 2022, Leno signed for newly promoted Premier club Fulham on a three-year contract with an option to extend by a further year, for a reported £8 million fee. He made his debut on 20 August in the 3–2 win against West London rivals Brentford. His first clean sheet came in Fulham's 3–0 win against Aston Villa on 20 October. The result led to Steven Gerrard's dismissal as Villa manager. On 13 December 2023, Leno signed a new contract with Fulham until the summer of 2027, with a club option to extend it for a further season. On 2 March 2025, he saved two penalties in Fulham's FA Cup Fifth Round shootout victory over reigning FA Cup holder Manchester United.

== International career ==
Leno received his first call up to the German senior squad in October 2015 for UEFA Euro 2016 qualifiers against the Republic of Ireland and Georgia. He debuted in a friendly match against Slovakia on 29 May 2016. Leno was also included in his nation's squad for the final tournament the following summer.

Leno was selected for the 2017 FIFA Confederations Cup in Russia. He played one game of the tournament, against Australia. He was named in Germany's provisional squad for the 2018 FIFA World Cup, but was not selected for the final 23-man squad. On 19 May 2021, he was selected to the squad for the UEFA Euro 2020.

== Career statistics ==
=== Club ===
As of match played 31 October 2026

Appearances and goals by club, season and competition
Club	Season	League			National cup (Note: Includes DFB-Pokal, FA Cup)		League cup (Note: Includes EFL Cup)		Europe		Other		Total	
Club	Season	Division	Apps	Goals	Apps	Goals	Apps	Goals	Apps	Goals	Apps	Goals	Apps	Goals
VfB Stuttgart II	2009–10	3. Liga	17	0	—		—		—		—		17	0
VfB Stuttgart II	2010–11	3. Liga	37	0	—		—		—		—		37	0
VfB Stuttgart II	2011–12	3. Liga	3	0	—		—		—		—		3	0
VfB Stuttgart II	Total		57	0	—		—		—		—		57	0
Bayer Leverkusen	2011–12	Bundesliga	33	0	0	0	—		8 (Note: Appearances in UEFA Champions League)	0	—		41	0
Bayer Leverkusen	2012–13	Bundesliga	32	0	2	0	—		6 (Note: Appearances in UEFA Europa League)	0	—		40	0
Bayer Leverkusen	2013–14	Bundesliga	34	0	4	0	—		8	0	—		46	0
Bayer Leverkusen	2014–15	Bundesliga	34	0	4	0	—		10	0	—		48	0
Bayer Leverkusen	2015–16	Bundesliga	33	0	4	0	—		12 (Note: Eight appearances in UEFA Champions League, four appearances in UEFA Europa League)	0	—		49	0
Bayer Leverkusen	2016–17	Bundesliga	34	0	1	0	—		7	0	—		42	0
Bayer Leverkusen	2017–18	Bundesliga	33	0	5	0	—		—		—		38	0
Bayer Leverkusen	Total		233	0	20	0	—		51	0	—		304	0
Arsenal	2018–19	Premier League	32	0	0	0	1	0	3	0	—		36	0
Arsenal	2019–20	Premier League	30	0	0	0	0	0	2	0	—		32	0
Arsenal	2020–21	Premier League	35	0	2	0	2	0	10	0	0	0	49	0
Arsenal	2021–22	Premier League	4	0	1	0	3	0	—		—		8	0
Arsenal	Total		101	0	3	0	6	0	15	0	0	0	125	0
Fulham	2022–23	Premier League	36	0	1	0	0	0	—		—		37	0
Fulham	2023–24	Premier League	38	0	0	0	3	0	—		—		41	0
Fulham	2024–25	Premier League	38	0	2	0	0	0	—		—		40	0
Fulham	2025–26	Premier League	38	0	0	0	0	0	—		—		38	0
Fulham	2026–27	Premier League	9	0	0	0	0	0	—		—		9	0
Fulham	Total		159	0	3	0	3	0	—		—		165	0
Career total			550	0	26	0	9	0	66	0	0	0	651	0

=== International ===
As of match played 2 September 2021

Appearances and goals by national team and year
National team	Year	Apps	Goals
Germany	2016	3	0
Germany	2017	3	0
Germany	2020	2	0
Germany	2021	1	0
Total		9	0

== Honours ==
Arsenal

- UEFA Europa League runner-up: 2018–19

Germany U17

- UEFA European Under-17 Championship: 2009

Germany

- FIFA Confederations Cup: 2017
