= 2018–19 Arsenal F.C. season =

English football club season

Arsenal
2018–19 season
- Owner: Kroenke Sports & Entertainment
- Chairman: Sir Chips Keswick
- Head coach: Unai Emery
- Stadium: Emirates Stadium
- Premier League: 5th
- FA Cup: Fourth round
- EFL Cup: Quarter-finals
- UEFA Europa League: Runners-up
- Top goalscorer: League: Pierre-Emerick Aubameyang (22); All: Pierre-Emerick Aubameyang (31)
Home colours	Away colours	Third colours

The 2018–19 season was Arsenal's 27th season in the Premier League, 102nd overall season in the top flight and 93rd consecutive season in the top flight of English football. The club participated in the Premier League and the UEFA Europa League, and participated in the FA Cup and the EFL Cup.

This was Arsenal's first season in 22 years without manager Arsène Wenger. For the second consecutive season, Arsenal qualified for the UEFA Europa League, improving on the last season's result and reaching the final where they were defeated by rivals Chelsea. This was the club's first and only full season under manager Unai Emery.

== Review ==
=== Pre-season ===
Arsenal began their off-season by completing some squad alterations. They started by announcing the departure of club captain Per Mertesacker, who retired to become their new academy coach. After six years at the club, Santi Cazorla's departure was also announced upon the expiry of his contract. Further, Petr Čech, Héctor Bellerín, Mohamed Elneny, Mesut Özil, Granit Xhaka and Ainsley Maitland-Niles all received new squad numbers, with the latter two also extending their contracts with the club.

After completing a clearout of backroom staff to coincide with their new club-model following the retirement of long-term manager Arsène Wenger, Spaniard Unai Emery was appointed as the club's new head coach.

The first signing of the Emery era was Swiss right-back Stephan Lichtsteiner, who joined on a free transfer from Juventus on 5 June. The club then signed German goalkeeper Bernd Leno from Bayer Leverkusen two weeks later, for a rumored fee of £19.2 million. Meanwhile, club stalwart Jack Wilshere departed following the expiry of his contract, after 17 years at the club, and Greek central defender Sokratis joined the club from Borussia Dortmund for £14.8 million on 8 July. Shortly thereafter, the club signed defensive midfielder Lucas Torreira from Sampdoria for a reported fee of £26.4 million on 10 July, and announced the transfer of Matteo Guendouzi from Lorient for a rumoured £7 million a day later.

=== August ===
On 7 August 2018, Alisher Usmanov announced that he would accept an offer from American businessman Stan Kroenke to buy his 30% stake in Arsenal for £550 million, in a deal that would allow Kroenke to take full control of the club.

Arsenal's first game was against reigning champions Manchester City on 12 August. They lost the game 2–0 after goals by Raheem Sterling and Bernardo Silva. The following game was against London rivals Chelsea on 18 August. Arsenal lost again, this time 3–2 though they had chances to get more from the game, courtesy of goals by Pedro, Álvaro Morata and Marcos Alonso while Henrikh Mkhitaryan and Alex Iwobi scored for Arsenal.

Arsenal's first win was a 3–1 victory against West Ham United on 25 August. Marko Arnautović scored first to put West Ham in front, but Nacho Monreal equalised minutes later, and an own goal by Issa Diop and a late goal by Danny Welbeck won the game for Arsenal.

=== September ===
Arsenal's first game in September and 4th game in the Premier League, was a 3–2 victory over Cardiff City on 2 September. Shkodran Mustafi scored the opening goal from a Granit Xhaka corner, but Víctor Camarasa equalised just before the break. After the restart, Pierre-Emerick Aubameyang scored his first goal of the season to give Arsenal the lead. Cardiff equalised again from a Danny Ward header, but Alexandre Lacazette ensured the victory with a thumping shot to give Arsenal another three points.

After the international break, Arsenal were the visitors against Newcastle United. After a dull first half, Granit Xhaka scored a stunning free kick to give Arsenal the lead. Mesut Özil doubled the advantage on his 200th appearance for Arsenal. Late on, Ciaran Clark scored in stoppage-time to give Newcastle hope. In the end, it was not enough as Arsenal won their third consecutive game 2–1.

Arsenal started the Europa League with a 4–2 victory over Vorskla Poltava. Aubameyang opened the scoring after a counterattack. Danny Welbeck doubled the advantage, before Aubameyang and Özil both scored to lead 4–0. However, Vorskla scored two goals late in the game though Arsenal still went away with victory.

Arsenal were at the Emirates against Everton. Lacazette scored a stunning opening goal, curling a shot into the top right corner. Moments later, Aubameyang scored a second for Arsenal, tapping in from close range, though Aubameyang was in an offside position. Nevertheless, Arsenal cruised to their fifth consecutive victory in all competitions.

To start off the EFL Cup campaign, Arsenal won 3–1 against Championship side Brentford. Arsenal scored twice through Welbeck, although Alan Judge pulled one back for Brentford. Alexandre Lacazette wrapped up the victory during stoppage-time to ensure Arsenal would progress to the next round. During the final match of September for Arsenal, they won 2–0 against Watford. Bernd Leno made his Premier League debut as a substitute after Petr Čech came off injured. Arsenal opened the scoring through a Craig Cathcart own goal following pressure by Lacazette. Özil doubled the lead when Lacazette squared the ball across for him to tap home. Arsenal came away with their seventh consecutive victory in all competitions and their fifth in the league.

=== October ===
Due to political tensions, Henrikh Mkhitaryan did not travel to Azerbaijan for Arsenal's Europa League match against Qarabağ. Arsenal nevertheless prevailed, 3–0, with Sokratis, Matteo Guendouzi and Emile Smith Rowe all scoring their debut goals.

Arsenal's strong form continued with a dominant 5–1 victory over Fulham. Although the match was tied 1–1 at half-time, Arsenal scored four second-half goals to extend their winning run to nine in all competitions. Aaron Ramsey scored just 39 seconds after being introduced as a substitute; two goals each by Lacazette and Aubameyang completed the scoresheet. A 3–1 victory against Leicester City on 22 October 2018 saw Özil become the highest scoring German player of the Premier League era, with 30 goals. They continued the winning form with a 1–0 victory against Sporting in the Europa League, with Danny Welbeck getting the deciding goal. However, Arsenal's winning streak was stopped at eleven with a 2–2 draw against Crystal Palace at Selhurst Park.

For their final match in October, Arsenal faced League One side Blackpool in the EFL Cup. The Gunners held a 2–0 lead courtesy of goals by Stephan Lichtsteiner and Emile Smith Rowe, but a second yellow card to Matteo Guendouzi allowed Blackpool to cut the lead to 2–1. Arsenal held on to advance to a quarterfinal matchup against Tottenham Hotspur.

=== November ===
Arsenal hosted Liverpool on 3 November 2018. A late strike by Alexandre Lacazette earned a point for the Gunners after James Milner gave Liverpool a second-half lead. In Europe, a 0–0 draw with Sporting secured passage into the round of 32, before a 1–1 draw with Wolverhampton Wanderers, where Henrikh Mkhitaryan's late strike ruled out Ivan Cavaleiro's opener.

After the international break, the Gunners played Bournemouth. A Jefferson Lerma own goal put them up before Joshua King equalized in first-half stoppage time. However, Aubameyang scored the winner to hand the Gunners their first victory of the month. Their final game of November was against Vorskla in the Europa League. UEFA decided before the match that it was to be moved from Poltava to Kyiv due to martial law in Ukraine, and Arsenal ran out 3–0 winners, with goals from Smith Rowe, Ramsey (from the penalty spot) and Joe Willock. This game also marked the debuts of Zech Medley, Charlie Gilmour, and Bukayo Saka, all from the substitute's bench, and confirmed that Arsenal would progress as group winners.

=== December ===
Arsenal hosted the first North London derby of the season on 2 December 2018. They took an early 1–0 lead after Aubameyang converted a penalty in the 10th minute following a Jan Vertonghen handball in the box. However, Spurs scored two goals in a span of five minutes to take a 2–1 lead at halftime. Emery made two substitutions and tactical changes at halftime, and the Gunners responded brilliantly, scoring three goals en route to a 4–2 comeback win; Aubameyang netted a brace and became the first player to score ten goals in the 2018–19 Premier League season; other goals from Alexandre Lacazette, and Lucas Torreira, of which was his first goal since joining the club.

Arsenal continued their unbeaten run against rivals Manchester United at Old Trafford. In what was a dull match, Rob Holding and Aaron Ramsey both suffered injuries, the former tearing his anterior cruciate ligament, thus ruling him out for the rest of the season. The game ended in a 2–2 draw, despite Arsenal scoring two goals which were disallowed in the second half.

Arsenal bounced back from their dropped points at Old Trafford with a 1–0 victory against Huddersfield at the Emirates. Alexandre Lacazette had a goal wrongly disallowed in the first half, and Arsenal finally broke the deadlock through a stunning overhead kick from Lucas Torreira, thus sealing the three points for Arsenal in an unsatisfying performance.

Arsenal won their final Europa League Group game at home against Qarabag. Alexandre Lacazette scored the only goal of the game in a 1–0 victory.

Arsenal lost 3–2 against Southampton at St. Mary's Stadium, thus ending their 22 games unbeaten run. Danny Ings opened the scoring for Southampton, but Henrikh Mkhitaryan equalized for Arsenal with a header. Ings got his second of the game just before halftime. In the second half, Henrikh Mkhitaryan equalized once again with a deflected effort. However, Charlie Austin scored in the 85th minute, capitalizing on a Bernd Leno error to nod home and defeat the Gunners.

The next match for Arsenal was a North London Derby at the Emirates against Tottenham in the EFL Cup. Tottenham got their revenge on Arsenal for the 4–2 defeat in the league with a 2–0 win, knocking out the Gunners from the competition.

Arsenal responded to their two consecutive losses with a 3–1 victory over Burnley. Pierre-Emerick Aubameyang opened the scoring in the 14th minute after a brilliant pass by Mesut Özil. Aubameyang scored his second in the 48th minute. Despite Ashley Barnes scoring to cut the deficit for Burnley, Alex Iwobi insured that Arsenal would walk away with all 3 points in stoppage time.

Arsenal faced Brighton away from home on Boxing Day. Aubameyang scored a goal early on after some brilliant footwork from Alexandre Lacazette. Despite the early lead, Jürgen Locadia scored, capitalizing on Stephan Lichtsteiner's error, forcing a draw at Falmer Stadium.

Arsenal's last game of 2018 was against title contenders Liverpool F.C. at Anfield. Arsenal got off to the perfect start with an 11th-minute goal from Ainsley Maitland-Niles. However, Liverpool responded brilliantly, with Roberto Firmino scoring twice within the space of a minute right after Arsenal's opener. Sadio Mané made matters worse with a goal in the 32nd minute. Mohammed Salah scored a penalty just before halftime, and Firmino got his hat trick with another penalty in the 55th minute, as Arsenal fell to a 5–1 defeat.

=== January ===
Arsenal started 2019 with a 4–1 victory against relegation contenders Fulham. Granit Xhaka, Alexandre Lacazette, Aaron Ramsey, and Pierre-Emerick Aubameyang scored for the Gunners; Aboubakar Kamara scored for the visitors.

Arsenal kicked off their FA Cup campaign away to Blackpool. Joe Willock scored a brace and Alex Iwobi added another en route to a 3–0 victory.

Arsenal lost again away in the league, Declan Rice's goal was enough for West Ham to snatch the 3 points at London Stadium. However, the Gunners responded in their next match, a 2–0 victory against rivals Chelsea at Emirates Stadium courtesy of Alexandre Lacazette and Laurent Koscielny goals took Arsenal within 3 points of the opponent. Despite the victory, the Gunners took a massive blow, as Hector Bellerín tore his anterior cruciate ligament, ruling him out for the rest of the season.

Next up was an FA Cup match against in-form rivals Manchester United. Alexis Sánchez scored for United against his former side. It was quickly made 2–0 in favor of the away team through Jesse Lingard. Pierre-Emerick Aubameyang halved the deficit just before the break, however Anthony Martial wrapped up the victory for United as Gunners were eliminated, losing 3–1.

Arsenal's final game in January came at home to Cardiff City, who were playing their first match since the death of Emiliano Sala. Aubameyang scored the first goal of the game, slotting his penalty home. Lacazette doubled the advantage after making a brilliant run into the box. Nathaniel Mendez-Laing scored a stoppage-time consolation for Cardiff. The victory sent Arsenal up to 4th place over Chelsea.

=== February ===
Arsenal's first match of February was a tough one, away to title contenders and defending champions Manchester City. Sergio Agüero scored for City in the 1st minute of the match. However, the Gunners responded, Laurent Koscielny nodded home from close range in the 10th minute. Agüero scored his second just before the break, and City extended their lead to 3–1 with a controversial goal from Agüero, thus sealing his hat trick.

Arsenal faced relegation-threatened Huddersfield away from home. Alex Iwobi scored first, before Lacazette doubled the advantage. Huddersfield scored a last-minute consolation, Sead Kolašinac scoring an own goal.

After more than two months away from Europe, the Gunners were back in Europa League action via a trip to Barysaw to face Belarusian minnows BATE Borisov. However, a lacklustre display ensued, and Stanislaw Drahuns header on the stroke of half time, coupled with Alexandre Lacazette's late red card, saw BATE record a famous 1–0 win and an advantage to take to North London.

However, the second leg had a fairly varying script to the first game, with defensive errors from BATE ultimately gifting Arsenal a 3–0 win, after an early own goal from Zakhar Volkov, coupled with free headers from Shkodran Mustafi and Sokratis Papastathopolous guided Arsenal into the last-16.

The Gunners built on the victory with a routine 2–0 home win over Southampton, earned after early goals from Lacazette and Henrikh Mkhitaryan. The Arsenal faithful then witnessed yet another Emirates Stadium win, with midfield masterclasses from Mkhitaryan and returning Mesut Özil setting up a 5–1 dismantling of Bournemouth. Both Özil and Mkhitaryan scored, with the latter setting up goals from Laurent Koscielny and Pierre-Emerick Aubameyang, whilst Lacazette was on the scoresheet for the third successive league match, bending home a wonderful free-kick with 12 minutes to play.

=== March ===
A testing March fixture schedule opened with a daunting trip to top-four rivals Tottenham Hotspur. Delays in the construction of Spurs new stadium meant the match was to be staged at Wembley, and the Gunners made a flying start, with Aaron Ramsey scoring for the fourth time at the national ground to put the visitors ahead on 16 minutes. A staggering double-save from Bernd Leno retained Arsenal's clean sheet before Tottenham were awarded a penalty mired in offside controversy in the 74th minute. Harry Kane buried the penalty to level the scores before Aubameyang was clipped in the penalty area in stoppage time. However, the Gabonese was denied from the spot, and Lucas Torreira was subsequently sent off late on as the Gunners had to settle for a frustrating 1–1 draw.

Things worsened in midweek as, despite going ahead after three minutes from Alex Iwobi, the Gunners fell to another road defeat as Stade Rennais earned a convincing 3–1 win in the Europa League round of 16 first leg. The turning point was undoubtedly Papastathopoulos's red card shortly before the break, with Rennes levelling a minute later through Benjamin Bourigeaud. In the second period, the Gunners completely fell apart, with Nacho Monreal's own goal and Ismaila Sarr's late header inflicting a dangerous wound upon the Gunners.

Arsenal then had a stern test forthcoming. Manchester United were the visitors to Emirates Stadium, and a tense encounter ensued. United were still unbeaten domestically under Ole Gunnar Solskjaer, but that was about to change. Despite the Red Devils dominating in chances, a resolute Arsenal backline, coupled with defensive errors at the other end, saw Granit Xhaka's long-range attempt misjudged by goalkeeper David de Gea to but Arsenal in front, before a penalty from Aubameyang saw the Gabonese make amends for his miss at Spurs to seal a vital 2–0 win.

The Gunners next fixture was at home against Rennes in the second leg of their round-of-16 tie. Trailing 3–1 from the first leg, Arsenal made the perfect start, with Aubameyang poking home Ramsey's cross after just five minutes to put them ahead. He then delivered a superb cross for Ainsley Maitland-Niles-Niles to make it 2–0 and put Arsenal ahead on away goals inside fifteen minutes. Rennes threatened sporadically, but Aubameyang added his second late on to wrap up a 3–0 triumph and 4–3 aggregate win.

=== April ===
April began with Arsenal seeking to rise to third after Tottenham's defeat at Liverpool closed the top-four gap to just a single point. The Gunners duly gathered the necessary three points after goals in either half from Aaron Ramsey and Alexandre Lacazette earned the Gunners a 2–0 victory over Newcastle United. It was also their 10th successive league win at the Emirates Stadium, the first time they had achieved such a run since its opening in 2006.

However, the Gunners' were hauled back out of the top four next time out after Phil Jagielka's 10th-minute goal earned Everton a 1–0 win over the listless Gunners.

Arsenal needed to bounce back, and had no better opportunity to do so than in the first-leg of their Europa League quarter-final tie, against one of the favourites, Italian giants SSC Napoli. And the Gunners responded, claiming an impressive 2–0 win and duly seize control of the tie. Aaron Ramsey had put the Gunners ahead early, before Lucas Torreira's effort on 25 minutes deflected in off Kalidou Koulibaly to settle the match.

Despite lying fifth in the table and on course for the Europa League semi-finals, Arsenal's away form had been sketchy all season long, and it was perhaps rather disappointing that the Gunners had to wait nine months prior to their first clean sheet on the road in the Premier League in a rather bizarre 1–0 win at Watford. The majority of the games action occurred inside the first eleven minutes, with Pierre-Emerick Aubameyang opening the scoring on ten minutes with one of the strangest goals of the season, with the lethal marksman managing to nip ahead of goalkeeper Ben Foster, and the Watford man hacked his clearance straight at Aubameyang as the ball rolled into the net. A minute later, Troy Deeney received his marching orders after elbowing Lucas Torreira in midfield. The ten-man Hornets did try hard, but ultimately fell to their first defeat of the month.

Arsenal then earned a second successive 1–0 win away from home as Alexandre Lacazette's stunning 36th-minute free-kick, coupled with a resolute defensive performance from the Gunners, saw them seal a vital win in Naples against Napoli, thus recording a 3–0 aggregate victory and subsequently qualifying them for the semi-finals for the second successive season. They were then drawn against Spanish outfit Valencia CF, who had ruthlessly dispatched fellow Spaniards Villarreal 5–1 on aggregate in the last eight.

Everything was going smoothly in North London prior to the Gunners home match against safety-hunting Crystal Palace. However, a dull first-half display saw Unai Emerys side head into the break a goal behind after Christian Bentekes early header, his first goal all year long. However, Arsenal made a swift start to the second period, with Mesut Özil's ingenious chip on 47 minutes making it 1–1. Nonetheless, quickfire goals after the hour from Wilfried Zaha and James McArthur further extended Palaces lead to 3–1, and though Aubameyang pulled a goal back, the Gunners fell to a morale-shattering 3–2 defeat in their first league defeat at home since August.

They failed to respond in their next encounter, a trip to Wolverhampton Wanderers, and a first half blitz from the high-flying Pack seeing them take a 3–0 advantage into the break after goals from Ruben Neves, Conor Coady and Diogo Jota. Sokratis Papastathopolous then scored his first league goal from the Gunners with ten minutes to play, but it wasn't enough as Wolves sealed a superb 3–1 win. Another capitulation ensued away to Leicester City next time out. At half-time, the game was locked at 0–0 but the Gunners were indeed a man down after a disputable Ainsley Maitland-Niles red card. With an hour played, Youri Tielemans headed the Foxes in front, before a late brace from the Gunners' arch-nemesis Jamie Vardy wrapped up a 3–0 triumph for Brendan Rodgers Leicester and leave Arsenal's top-four hopes in serious jeopardy.

=== May ===
However, Europe once again proved the saviour of Arsenal, as a brace from Alexandre Lacazette laid the scaffolds for an impressive 3–1 comeback victory over Valencia in the first leg of the Europa League semi-final at the Emirates Stadium. However, it was the visitors who took the lead in North London, with Mouctar Diakhaby finishing off a clever Valencia set-piece move with a firm header, before Alexandre Lacazette slammed home Aubameyangs square ball to level it. Lacazette nodded home Granit Xhaka's cross before the break to make it 2–1 before Aubameyang wrapped up the win in the final minute of normal time, volleying home Sead Kolasinac's cross to ensure Arsenal took a healthy advantage to the second leg in Spain.

The Gunners had one foot in the Europa League final, but the top-four looked unlikely. The Gunners had to beat Brighton at home to attain any realistic chance of regaining their top-four status, and made the perfect start after Pierre-Emerick Aubameyang stroked home from the spot on nine minutes to put Arsenal in front. However, on the hour mark, Brighton were gifted a route back into the game after Solly March was hauled down from Granit Xhaka. Glenn Murray duly netted his 200th league career goal as the Seagulls earned a creditable 1–1 draw, leaving the Gunners needing to have three points and eight goal difference swing in their favour on the final day.

With the top four realistically out of reach, the Gunners travelled to Spain to contest what was arguably their most vital match of the season so far away to Valencia in the Europa League semi-final second leg. However, Valencia-in need of a 2–0 win to progress-made a fast start, taking the lead on 11 minutes after Kevin Gameiro turned home Rodrigo's cross, but a stunning volley from Aubameyang saw the two sides head into the break locked at 1–1, with Arsenal leading 4–2 on aggregate. Five minutes into the second period, Arsenal practically sealed progression to the final in Baku after Alexandre Lacazette rifled home Lucas Torreira's pass, before Valencia made it 2–2 after Gameiro added his second, bundling over the line. However, the hosts found them behind again after Aubameyang poked home Maitland-Niles' low cross, before the Gunners' top scorer completed his first-ever Arsenal hat-trick, powering Henrikh Mkhitaryans through-ball, as Arsenal secured a famous 4–2 win, subsequently swaggering into the UEFA Europa League final for the first time since its 2009 rebrand, hammering Valencia 7–3 on aggregate. Later in the day, it was confirmed that Chelsea had beaten Eintracht Frankfurt on penalties after a 2–2 aggregate draw, meaning that all four finalists in Europe that season were from England, the first time this had happened from any country in history.

Qualified for the Europa League final and out of the top-four race, Arsenal named a weakened line-up in their fixture at Burnley on the final day of the season. After a goalless first 45', a loose ball from Ben Mee sent Aubameyang through on goal in the 52nd minute. He duly put Arsenal ahead, before volleying home Alex Iwobi's cross eleven minutes later to make it 2–0. Ashley Barnes then pulled a goal back for the home side before substitute-18-year-old Eddie Nketiah-netted his first Premier League goal for Arsenal, as the Gunners sealed a 3–1 win, thus finishing fifth, just one point behind Tottenham Hotspur.

After the league disappointment, Arsenal had two weeks to prepare for what was dubbed as their most important game of the decade, the UEFA Europa League final against Chelsea in the Baku Olympic Stadium, Azerbaijan. However, the build-up was mired in controversy, with the undersized Baku airports permitting just 4000 fans of each London side, not to mention the 6628 mile round-trip, but the worst was in regard to Henrikh Mkhitaryans. One of the Gunners' better players in 2019, the fractioned relations between Armenia and Azerbaijan ensued in warnings from the Azerbaijani sports government, advising the midfielder not to travel. Mkhitaryan decided not to, with the Gunners heading to East Europe without him.

In Baku, Arsenal and Chelsea walked out to empty seats. The first period ended goalless. Four minutes into the second period, Olivier Giroud nodded home Emerson Palmieri's cross against his former club to make it 1–0 Chelsea, before Pedro Rodriguez scored on the hour to make it 2–0. Eden Hazard then scored from the spot to make it 3–0. A half-volley from Alex Iwobi with 21 minutes made it 3–1, but Eden Hazard soon notched his second as Chelsea sealed a 4–1 victory, leaving Arsenal trophy-less at the end of the season.

== Players ==
N	Pos.	Nat.	Name	Age	EU	Since	App	Goals	Ends	Transfer fee	Notes
1	GK	(Czech Republic)	Petr Čech	37	EU	2015	139	0	2019	£10.0M	Vice-captain
2	DF	(Spain)	Héctor Bellerín	24	EU	2013	181	7	2023	Youth system	
4	MF	(Egypt)	Mohamed Elneny	26	Non-EU	2016 (Winter)	89	2	2022	£7.4M	
5	DF	(Greece)	Sokratis Papastathopoulos	31	EU	2018	40	3	2021	£14.8M	
6	DF	(France)	Laurent Koscielny	33	EU	2010	353	27	2020	£8.5M	Captain
7	MF	(Armenia)	Henrikh Mkhitaryan	30	Non-EU	2018 (Winter)	56	9	2021	Swap deal	
8	MF	(Wales)	Aaron Ramsey	28	EU	2008	369	64	2019	£4.8M	Vice-captain
9	FW	(France)	Alexandre Lacazette	28	EU	2017	88	36	2022	£46.5M	
10	MF	(Germany)	Mesut Özil	30	EU	2013	231	43	2021	£42.5M	Vice-captain
11	MF	(Uruguay)	Lucas Torreira	23	EU	2018	50	2	2023	£26.4M	
12	DF	(Switzerland)	Stephan Lichtsteiner	35	EU	2018	23	1	2019	Free	
13	GK	(Colombia)	David Ospina	30	Non-EU	2014	70	0	2020	£3.2M	On loan at Napoli
14	FW	(Gabon)	Pierre-Emerick Aubameyang	30	EU	2018 (Winter)	65	41	2021	£56.0M	Current record signing
15	MF	(England)	Ainsley Maitland-Niles	21	EU	2014	68	2	2023	Youth system	
16	DF	(England)	Rob Holding	23	EU	2016	60	1	2023	£2.0M	
17	FW	(Nigeria)	Alex Iwobi	23	EU	2015	149	15	2022	Youth system	
18	DF	(Spain)	Nacho Monreal	33	EU	2013 (Winter)	248	10	2019	£8.5M	
19	GK	(Germany)	Bernd Leno	27	EU	2018	36	0	2023	£19.2M	
20	DF	(Germany)	Shkodran Mustafi	27	EU	2016	115	8	2021	£35.0M	
21	DF	(England)	Calum Chambers	24	EU	2014	83	3	2022	£16.0M	On loan at Fulham
22	MF	(Spain)	Denis Suárez	25	EU	2019 (Winter)	6	0	2019	—	On loan from Barcelona
23	FW	(England)	Danny Welbeck	28	EU	2014	126	32	2019	£16.0M	
25	DF	(England)	Carl Jenkinson	27	EU	2011	69	1	2020	£1.0M	
26	GK	(Argentina)	Emiliano Martínez	26	Non-EU	2012	14	0	2022	Youth system	On loan at Reading
27	DF	(Greece)	Konstantinos Mavropanos	21	EU	2018 (Winter)	7	0	2023	£1.8M	
29	MF	(France)	Matteo Guendouzi	20	EU	2018	48	1	2023	£7.0M	
31	DF	(Bosnia and Herzegovina)	Sead Kolašinac	26	EU	2017	72	5	2022	Free	
34	MF	(Switzerland)	Granit Xhaka	26	EU	2016	134	11	2023	£30.0M	Vice-captain
—	FW	(Japan)	Takuma Asano	24	Non-EU	2016	0	0	2020	£0.8M	On loan at Hannover 96

- Last updated: 29 May 2019
- Source: Arsenal FC and FootballDatabase (for EU passport, country as international player, contract ending and transfer fee)
- Ordered by squad number.

== Transfers ==
=== Transfers in ===
Date from	Position	Name	From	Fee	Team	Ref.
23 May 2018	GK	(Estonia) Karl Hein	(Estonia) Nõmme United	Free transfer	Academy	
1 July 2018	DF	(Switzerland) Stephan Lichtsteiner	(Italy) Juventus	Free transfer	First team	
1 July 2018	GK	(Germany) Bernd Leno	(Germany) Bayer Leverkusen	£22,500,000 (Note: Reported fee: £19,200,000.)	First team	
2 July 2018	DF	(Greece) Sokratis Papastathopoulos	(Germany) Borussia Dortmund	£14,400,000 (Note: Reported fee: £17,700,000.)	First team	
10 July 2018	MF	(Uruguay) Lucas Torreira	(Italy) Sampdoria	£27,000,000 (Note: Reported fee: £26,000,000.)	First team	
11 July 2018	FW	(England) Sam Greenwood	(England) Sunderland	Training compensation (Note: Player under 24 years old at time of transfer.)	Academy	
11 July 2018	MF	(France) Matteo Guendouzi	(France) Lorient	£8,000,000 (Note: Reported fee: "in the region of £8m")	First team	
19 July 2018	DF	(Spain) Joel López	(Spain) Barcelona	Training compensation	Academy	
27 July 2018	MF	(Mexico) Marcelo Flores	(England) Ipswich Town	Training compensation	Academy	

=== Loans in ===
Date from	Position	Name	From	End date	Team	Ref.
31 January 2019	MF	(Spain) Denis Suárez	(Spain) Barcelona	End of season	First team	
7 February 2019	GK	(England) James Hillson	(England) Reading	End of season	Academy	

=== Transfers out ===
Date from	Position	Name	To	Fee	Team	Ref.
1 July 2018
1 July 2018	MF	(Spain) Santi Cazorla	(Spain) Villarreal	Released (Note: Joined Villarreal on 7 August 2018.)	First team	
1 July 2018	DF	(Germany) Per Mertesacker	Retired		First team	
1 July 2018	MF	(England) Jack Wilshere	(England) West Ham United	Released (Note: Joined West Ham United on 9 July 2018.)	First team	
1 July 2018	DF	(England) Marc Bola	(England) Blackpool	Released (Note: Joined Blackpool on 17 July 2017.)	Academy	
1 July 2018	GK	(Scotland) Alex Crean	Released		Academy	
1 July 2018	MF	(England) Josh Dasilva	(England) Brentford	Released (Note: Joined Brentford on 21 August 2018.)	Academy	
1 July 2018	MF	(Romania) Vlad Dragomir	(Italy) Perugia	Released (Note: Joined Perugia on 3 August 2018.)	Academy	
1 July 2018	MF	(England) Aaron Eyoma	(England) Derby County	Released (Note: Joined Derby County on 5 July 2018.)	Academy	
1 July 2018	FW	(France) Yassin Fortune	(Switzerland) FC Sion	Released (Note: Joined Sion on 1 July 2018.)	Academy	
1 July 2018	GK	(England) Ryan Huddart	(England) Boreham Wood	Released (Note: Joined Boreham Wood on 26 July 2018.)	Academy	
1 July 2018	DF	(England) Chiori Johnson	(England) Bolton Wanderers	Released (Note: Joined Bolton Wanderers on 1 July 2018.)	Academy	
1 July 2018	GK	(Finland) Hugo Keto	(England) Brighton & Hove Albion	Released (Note: Joined Brighton & Hove Albion on 9 July 2018.)	Academy	
1 July 2018	DF	(England) Tafari Moore	(England) Plymouth Argyle	Released (Note: Joined Plymouth Argyle on 1 July 2018.)	Academy	
1 July 2018	MF	(England) Josh Benson	(England) Burnley	Released	Academy	
1 July 2018	MF	(England) Jay Beckford	(Norway) Lillehammer	Released	Academy	
12 July 2018	FW	(England) David Agbontohoma	(England) Southampton	Training compensation	Academy	
13 July 2018	FW	(England) Armstrong Oko-Flex	(Scotland) Celtic	Training compensation	Academy	
26 July 2018	FW	(France) Jeff Reine-Adélaïde	(France) Angers	~£1,440,000	First team	
3 August 2018	FW	(England) Chuba Akpom	(Greece) PAOK	Undisclosed (Note: Reported fee: £2,000,000.)	First team	
3 August 2018	GK	(Portugal) João Virgínia	(England) Everton	Undisclosed	Academy	
9 August 2018	FW	(Spain) Lucas Pérez	(England) West Ham United	Undisclosed (Note: Reported fee: £4,000,000.)	First team	
17 August 2018	FW	(Costa Rica) Joel Campbell	(Italy) Frosinone	Undisclosed	First team	
17 August 2018	FW	(England) Stephy Mavididi	(Italy) Juventus	Undisclosed	Academy	
23 January 2019	GK	(Wales) Daniel Barden	(England) Norwich City	Undisclosed	Academy	
11 March 2019	MF	(United States) Gedion Zelalem	(United States) Sporting KC	Free Transfer	Academy	
20 March 2019	MF	(England) Josh Martin	(England) Norwich City	Undisclosed	Academy	

=== Loans out ===
Start date	Position	Name	To	End date	Team	Ref.
1 July 2018	FW	(Japan) Takuma Asano	(Germany) Hannover 96	End of season	First team	
19 July 2018	MF	(Nigeria) Kelechi Nwakali	(Portugal) Porto	End of season	Academy	
30 July 2018	GK	(England) Matt Macey	(England) Plymouth Argyle	End of season	Academy	
7 August 2018	DF	(England) Calum Chambers	(England) Fulham	End of season	First team	
16 August 2018	MF	(Poland) Krystian Bielik	(England) Charlton Athletic	End of season	Academy	
17 August 2018	GK	(Colombia) David Ospina	(Italy) Napoli	End of season	First team	
31 August 2018	MF	(England) Reiss Nelson	(Germany) Hoffenheim	End of season	First team	
23 January 2019	GK	(Argentina) Emiliano Martínez	(England) Reading	End of season	First team	
31 January 2019	MF	(England) Emile Smith Rowe	(Germany) RB Leipzig	End of season	First team	

== Club ==
=== Kits ===
Supplier: Puma / Sponsor: Emirates (front shirt) / Visit Rwanda (sleeves)

Home	Home alt.1	Home alt.2	Home alt.3	Away	Away alt.1	Third	Goalkeeper 1	Goalkeeper 2	Goalkeeper 3

== Squad statistics ==
=== Appearances and goals ===
As of 29 May 2019

No.	Pos.	Nat.	Name	Premier League		FA Cup		EFL Cup		Europa League		Total	
No.	Pos.	Nat.	Name	Apps	Goals	Apps	Goals	Apps	Goals	Apps	Goals	Apps	Goals
1	GK	CZE	Petr Čech	7	0	2	0	2	0	11	0	22	0
2	DF	ESP	Héctor Bellerín	18(1)	0	0	0	0	0	0	0	18(1)	0
4	MF	EGY	Mohamed Elneny	5(3)	0	1	0	1	0	5(2)	0	12(5)	0
5	DF	GRE	Sokratis Papastathopoulos	25	1	2	0	1	0	11(1)	2	39(1)	3
6	DF	FRA	Laurent Koscielny	13(4)	3	1	0	0(1)	0	10	0	24(5)	3
7	MF	ARM	Henrikh Mkhitaryan	19(6)	6	0	0	3	0	6(5)	0	28(11)	6
8	MF	WAL	Aaron Ramsey	13(14)	4	2	0	2(1)	0	6(1)	2	23(16)	6
9	FW	FRA	Alexandre Lacazette	27(8)	13	1(1)	0	0(2)	1	8(2)	5	36(13)	19
10	MF	GER	Mesut Özil	20(4)	5	0(1)	0	0	0	8(2)	1	28(7)	6
11	MF	URU	Lucas Torreira	24(10)	2	1	0	1(2)	0	6(6)	0	32(18)	2
12	DF	SUI	Stephan Lichtsteiner	10(4)	0	1	0	2	1	6	0	19(4)	1
14	FW	GAB	Pierre-Emerick Aubameyang	30(6)	22	1	1	1(1)	0	10(2)	8	42(9)	31
15	MF	ENG	Ainsley Maitland-Niles	11(5)	1	2	0	2	0	9(1)	1	24(6)	2
16	DF	ENG	Rob Holding	9(1)	0	0	0	1	0	5	0	15(1)	0
17	FW	NGA	Alex Iwobi	22(13)	3	2	1	2(1)	0	6(5)	2	32(19)	6
18	DF	ESP	Nacho Monreal	21(1)	1	0	0	2	0	10(2)	0	33(3)	1
19	GK	GER	Bernd Leno	31(1)	0	0	0	1	0	3	0	35(1)	0
20	DF	GER	Shkodran Mustafi	31	2	0(1)	0	2	0	5(1)	1	38(2)	3
22	MF	SPA	Denis Suárez	0(4)	0	0	0	0	0	0(2)	0	0(6)	0
23	FW	ENG	Danny Welbeck	1(7)	1	0	0	2	2	4	2	7(7)	5
25	DF	ENG	Carl Jenkinson	2(1)	0	1	0	1	0	3	0	7(1)	0
27	DF	GRE	Konstantinos Mavropanos	3(1)	0	0	0	0	0	0	0	3(1)	0
29	MF	FRA	Matteo Guendouzi	23(10)	0	0(1)	0	3	0	7(4)	1	33(15)	1
31	DF	BIH	Sead Kolašinac	22(2)	0	2	0	0	0	8(2)	0	32(4)	0
34	MF	SUI	Granit Xhaka	29	4	1	0	1	0	9	0	40	4
43	MF	SCO	Charlie Gilmour	0	0	0	0	0	0	0(2)	0	0(2)	0
47	DF	ENG	Zech Medley	0	0	0(1)	0	0	0	0(2)	0	0(3)	0
49	FW	ENG	Eddie Nketiah	0(5)	1	1	0	0(1)	0	2	0	3(6)	1
53	DF	ESP	Julio Pleguezuelo	0	0	0	0	1	0	0	0	1	0
59	MF	ENG	Joe Willock	1(1)	0	1	2	0	0	2(1)	1	4(2)	3
87	FW	ENG	Bukayo Saka	0(1)	0	0(1)	0	0	0	1(1)	0	1(3)	0
Players out on loan for rest of the season
13	GK	COL	David Ospina	0	0	0	0	0	0	0	0	0	0
21	DF	ENG	Calum Chambers	0	0	0	0	0	0	0	0	0	0
26	GK	ARG	Emiliano Martinez	0	0	0	0	0	0	1	0	1	0
55	MF	ENG	Emile Smith Rowe	0	0	0	0	2	1	3(1)	2	5(1)	3
N/A	FW	JPN	Takuma Asano	0	0	0	0	0	0	0	0	0	0

=== Goalscorers ===
As of 29 May 2019

Rank	Position	Name	Premier League	FA Cup	EFL Cup	Europa League	Total
1	FW	(Gabon) Pierre-Emerick Aubameyang	22	1	0	8	31
2	FW	(France) Alexandre Lacazette	13	0	1	5	19
3	FW	(Nigeria) Alex Iwobi	3	1	0	2	6
3	MF	(Armenia) Henrikh Mkhitaryan	6	0	0	0	6
3	MF	(Germany) Mesut Özil	5	0	0	1	6
3	MF	(Wales) Aaron Ramsey	4	0	0	2	6
7	FW	(England) Danny Welbeck	1	0	2	2	5
8	MF	(Switzerland) Granit Xhaka	4	0	0	0	4
9	DF	(France) Laurent Koscielny	3	0	0	0	3
9	DF	(Germany) Shkodran Mustafi	2	0	0	1	3
9	DF	(Greece) Sokratis Papastathopoulos	1	0	0	2	3
9	MF	(England) Emile Smith Rowe	0	0	1	2	3
9	MF	(England) Joe Willock	0	2	0	1	3
14	MF	(England) Ainsley Maitland-Niles	1	0	0	1	2
14	MF	(Uruguay) Lucas Torreira	2	0	0	0	2
16	MF	(France) Matteo Guendouzi	0	0	0	1	1
16	DF	(Switzerland) Stephan Lichtsteiner	0	0	1	0	1
16	DF	(Spain) Nacho Monreal	1	0	0	0	1
16	FW	(England) Eddie Nketiah	1	0	0	0	1
Own goals			4	0	0	2	6
Total			73	4	5	30	112

=== Disciplinary record ===
As of 29 May 2019

Rank	Position	Name	Premier League		FA Cup		EFL Cup		Europa League		Total	
Rank	Position	Name	Yellow card	Red card	Yellow card	Red card	Yellow card	Red card	Yellow card	Red card	Yellow card	Red card
1	DF	(Greece) Sokratis Papastathopoulos	12	0	0	0	0	0	0	1	12	1
2	MF	(France) Matteo Guendouzi	8	0	1	0	1	1	1	0	11	1
3	MF	(Uruguay) Lucas Torreira	7	1	0	0	0	0	0	0	7	1
4	FW	(France) Alexandre Lacazette	2	0	0	0	0	0	2	1	3	1
5	MF	(England) Ainsley Maitland-Niles	1	1	0	0	0	0	0	0	1	1
6	MF	(Switzerland) Granit Xhaka	10	0	0	0	1	0	2	0	13	0
7	DF	(Germany) Shkodran Mustafi	9	0	0	0	0	0	0	0	9	0
8	DF	(Bosnia and Herzegovina) Sead Kolašinac	5	0	2	0	0	0	1	0	8	0
9	DF	(Switzerland) Stephan Lichtsteiner	3	0	0	0	1	0	1	0	5	0
9	DF	(Spain) Nacho Monreal	5	0	0	0	0	0	0	0	5	0
11	DF	(England) Rob Holding	1	0	0	0	0	0	3	0	4	0
12	DF	(Spain) Héctor Bellerín	3	0	0	0	0	0	0	0	3	0
12	MF	(Armenia) Henrikh Mkhitaryan	1	0	0	0	0	0	2	0	3	0
12	MF	(Germany) Mesut Özil	2	0	0	0	0	0	1	0	3	0
15	DF	(France) Laurent Koscielny	1	0	1	0	0	0	0	0	2	0
16	FW	(Gabon) Pierre-Emerick Aubameyang	0	0	0	0	0	0	1	0	1	0
16	GK	(Czech Republic) Petr Čech	0	0	0	0	0	0	1	0	1	0
16	DF	(England) Carl Jenkinson	0	0	0	0	1	0	0	0	1	0
16	DF	(Greece) Konstantinos Mavropanos	1	0	0	0	0	0	0	0	1	0
16	FW	(England) Danny Welbeck	0	0	0	0	1	0	0	0	1	0
Total			71	2	4	0	5	1	15	2	95	5

=== Clean sheets ===
As of 29 May 2019

Rank	Name	Premier League	FA Cup	EFL Cup	Europa League	Total
1	(Czech Republic) Petr Čech	1	1	0	6	8
1	(Germany) Bernd Leno	6	0	0	2	8
3	(Argentina) Emiliano Martínez	0	0	0	1	1
Shared		1	0	0	0	1
Total		8	1	0	9	18

== Pre-season and friendlies ==
Win Draw Loss

=== Friendlies ===
14 July 2018	Boreham Wood	0–8	Arsenal	Borehamwood, Hertfordshire, England
15:00 BST		Report	Aubameyang 7', 9', 17' (pen.); Nelson 35'; Lacazette 40'; Nketiah 53'; Reine-Adélaïde 71'; Mkhitaryan 80'	Stadium: Meadow Park

4 August 2018	Arsenal	2–0	Lazio	Stockholm, Sweden
20:00 CEST; 19:00 BST	Nelson 18'; Aubameyang 64'; Holding (yellow card) 77'	Report		Stadium: Friends Arena; Referee: Martin Strömbergsson (Sweden)

26 March 2019	Al Nasr	2–3	Arsenal	Dubai, United Arab Emirates
13:30 GMT	Fernández 14'; Jalal 90' (pen.)	Report	Jenkinson 42'; Lacazette 51'; John-Jules 72'	Stadium: Al Maktoum Stadium

=== International Champions Cup ===
26 July 2018 2018 ICC (Asia)	Atlético Madrid	1–1 (3–1 p)	Arsenal	Kallang, Singapore
19:30 SST; 12:30 BST	Vietto 41'	Report	Smith Rowe 47'; Chambers (yellow card) 80'	Stadium: National Stadium; Attendance: 23,095; Referee: Ahmad A'Qashah (Singapore)
	Penalties
	Correa (penalty missed); Rodri (penalty scored); Garcés (penalty missed); Mollejo (penalty scored); Adán (penalty scored)		(penalty missed) Mkhitaryan; (penalty missed) Willock; (penalty scored) Maitland-Niles; (penalty missed) Nketiah

28 July 2018 2018 ICC (Asia)	Arsenal	5–1	Paris Saint-Germain	Kallang, Singapore
19:30 SST; 12:30 BST	Özil 13'; Lacazette 67', 71'; Holding 87'; Nketiah 90+4'	Report	Diarra (yellow card) 51'; Nkunku 60' (pen.)	Stadium: National Stadium; Attendance: 50,308; Referee: Nathan Rong De Chan (Singapore)

1 August 2018 2018 ICC (Europe)	Arsenal	1–1 (6–5 p)	Chelsea	Dublin, Ireland
21:05 CEST; 20:05 BST	Lacazette 90+3'	Report	Rüdiger 5'	Stadium: Aviva Stadium; Attendance: 46,002; Referee: Paul McLaughlin (Republic of Ireland)
	Penalties
	Lacazette (penalty scored); Nelson (penalty scored); Guendouzi (penalty scored); Maitland-Niles (penalty scored); Özil (penalty scored); Iwobi (penalty scored)		(penalty scored) Drinkwater; (penalty scored) Abraham; (penalty scored) Moses; (penalty scored) Emerson; (penalty scored) Piazon; (penalty missed) Loftus-Cheek

== Competitions ==
Win Draw Loss

=== Overview ===
Competition	Record							
Competition	P	W	D	L	GF	GA	GD	Win %
Premier League	38	21	7	10	73	51	+22	55.26
FA Cup	2	1	0	1	4	3	+1	50.00
EFL Cup	3	2	0	1	5	4	+1	66.67
Europa League	15	11	1	3	30	13	+17	73.33
Total	58	35	8	15	112	71	+41	60.34

Updated to match played 29 May 2019
Source: Competitions

=== Premier League ===
==== League table ====
Pos	Team	Pld	W	D	L	GF	GA	GD	Pts	Qualification or relegation
3	Chelsea	38	21	9	8	63	39	+24	72	Qualification to Champions League group stage
4	Tottenham Hotspur	38	23	2	13	67	39	+28	71	Qualification to Champions League group stage
5	Arsenal	38	21	7	10	73	51	+22	70	Qualification to Europa League group stage (Note: Since the winners of the EFL Cup and the FA Cup, Manchester City, qualified for the Champions League, the spot given to the FA Cup winners (Europa League group stage) was passed to the sixth-placed team and the spot given to the League Cup winners (Europa League second qualifying round) was passed to the seventh-placed team.)
6	Manchester United	38	19	9	10	65	54	+11	66	Qualification to Europa League group stage
7	Wolverhampton Wanderers	38	16	9	13	47	46	+1	57	Qualification to Europa League second qualifying round

Source: Premier League
Rules for classification: 1) Points; 2) Goal difference; 3) Goals scored; 4) Play-offs (only if needed to decide champion, teams for relegation or teams for UEFA competitions).

==== Results summary ====
Overall								Home						Away					
Pld	W	D	L	GF	GA	GD	Pts	W	D	L	GF	GA	GD	W	D	L	GF	GA	GD
38	21	7	10	73	51	+22	70	14	3	2	42	16	+26	7	4	8	31	35	−4

Last updated: 12 May 2019.
Source: Premier League

==== Result by matchday ====
Round	1	2	3	4	5	6	7	8	9	10	11	12	13	14	15	16	17	18	19	20	21	22	23	24	25	26	27	28	29	30	31	32	33	34	35	36	37	38
Ground	H	A	H	A	A	H	H	A	H	A	H	H	A	H	A	H	A	H	A	A	H	A	H	H	A	A	H	H	A	H	H	A	A	H	A	A	H	A
Result	L	L	W	W	W	W	W	W	W	D	D	D	W	W	D	W	L	W	D	L	W	L	W	W	L	W	W	W	D	W	W	L	W	L	L	L	D	W
Position	15	17	9	9	7	6	5	4	4	4	5	5	5	4	5	5	5	5	5	5	5	5	5	4	6	5	4	4	5	4	3	4	4	5	5	5	5	5
Points	0	0	3	6	9	12	15	18	21	22	23	24	27	30	31	34	34	37	38	38	41	41	44	47	47	50	53	56	57	60	63	63	66	66	66	66	67	70

Updated to match(es) played on 12 May 2019. Source: Statto.com
A = Away; H = Home; W = Win; D = Draw; L = Loss

==== Matches ====
On 14 June 2018, the Premier League fixtures for the forthcoming season were announced.

12 August 2018 1	Arsenal	0–2	Manchester City	Holloway
16:00 BST	Papastathopoulos (yellow card) 27'; Xhaka (yellow card) 52'	Report	Sterling (yellow card) 4', (goal) 14'; B. Silva 64'; De Bruyne (yellow card) 73'	Stadium: Emirates Stadium; Attendance: 59,934; Referee: Michael Oliver

18 August 2018 2	Chelsea	3–2	Arsenal	Fulham
17:30 BST	Pedro 8'; Morata 20'; Alonso 81'	Report	Xhaka (yellow card) 27'; Mkhitaryan 37'; Iwobi 41'; Mustafi (yellow card) 77'	Stadium: Stamford Bridge; Attendance: 40,491; Referee: Martin Atkinson

25 August 2018 3	Arsenal	3–1	West Ham United	Holloway
15:00 BST	Monreal 30'; Diop 70' (o.g.); Papastathopoulos (yellow card) 90'; Welbeck 90+2'	Report	Arnautović 25'; Diop (yellow card) 41'; Fredericks (yellow card) 80'; Wilshere (yellow card) 88'	Stadium: Emirates Stadium; Attendance: 59,830; Referee: Graham Scott

2 September 2018 4	Cardiff City	2–3	Arsenal	Cardiff, Wales
13:30 BST	Camarasa 45+2'; Ward 70'; Hoilett (yellow card) 71'; Camarasa (yellow card) 77'; Arter (yellow card) 90+3'	Report	Mustafi 11'; Monreal (yellow card) 25'; Bellerín (yellow card) 51'; Guendouzi (yellow card) 58'; Aubameyang 62'; Xhaka (yellow card) 66'; Lacazette 81'	Stadium: Cardiff City Stadium; Attendance: 32,316; Referee: Anthony Taylor

15 September 2018 5	Newcastle United	1–2	Arsenal	Newcastle upon Tyne
15:00 BST	Clark 90+1'	Report	Xhaka 49'; Özil 58'	Stadium: St James' Park; Attendance: 52,165; Referee: Lee Probert

23 September 2018 6	Arsenal	2–0	Everton	Holloway
16:00 BST	Torreira (yellow card) 15'; Papastathopoulos (yellow card) 30'; Lacazette 56'; Aubameyang 59'	Report	Digne (yellow card) 27'	Stadium: Emirates Stadium; Attendance: 59,964; Referee: Jonathan Moss

29 September 2018 7	Arsenal	2–0	Watford	Holloway
15:00 BST	Torreira (yellow card) 45'; Mustafi (yellow card) 62'; Cathcart 81' (o.g.); Özil 83'	Report	Deeney (yellow card) 31'; Doucouré (yellow card) 79'	Stadium: Emirates Stadium; Attendance: 60,019; Referee: Anthony Taylor

7 October 2018 8	Fulham	1–5	Arsenal	Fulham
12:00 BST	Schürrle 44', (yellow card) 70'; Vietto (yellow card) 57'	Report	Lacazette 29', 49'; Ramsey 67'; Aubameyang 79', 90+1'	Stadium: Craven Cottage; Attendance: 25,401; Referee: Paul Tierney

22 October 2018 9	Arsenal	3–1	Leicester City	Holloway
20:00 BST	Holding (yellow card) 17'; Xhaka (yellow card) 35'; Özil 45'; Aubameyang 63', 66'	Report	Bellerín 31' (o.g.); Albrighton (yellow card) 64'; Pereira (yellow card) 65'	Stadium: Emirates Stadium; Attendance: 59,886; Referee: Chris Kavanagh

28 October 2018 10	Crystal Palace	2–2	Arsenal	Selhurst
13:30 GMT	J. Ayew (yellow card) 8'; Milivojević 45+1' (pen.), 83' (pen.)	Report	Xhaka 51'; Aubameyang 56'; Lichsteiner (yellow card) 79'; Guendouzi (yellow card) 90+4'	Stadium: Selhurst Park; Attendance: 25,718; Referee: Martin Atkinson

3 November 2018 11	Arsenal	1–1	Liverpool	Holloway
17:30 GMT	Lacazette 82', (yellow card) 83'	Report	Fabinho (yellow card) 52'; Milner 61'	Stadium: Emirates Stadium; Attendance: 59,993; Referee: Andre Marriner

11 November 2018 12	Arsenal	1–1	Wolverhampton Wanderers	Holloway
16:30 GMT	Özil (yellow card) 69'; Bellerín (yellow card) 78'; Mkhitaryan 86'	Report	Cavaleiro 13'; Doherty (yellow card) 71'; Costa (yellow card) 74'	Stadium: Emirates Stadium; Attendance: 60,030; Referee: Stuart Attwell

25 November 2018 13	Bournemouth	1–2	Arsenal	Bournemouth
13:30 GMT	King 45+1'; Aké (yellow card) 52'; Lerma (yellow card) 66'	Report	Papastathopoulos (yellow card) 25'; Lerma 30' (o.g.); Aubameyang 67'	Stadium: Vitality Stadium; Attendance: 10,792; Referee: Craig Pawson

2 December 2018 14	Arsenal	4–2	Tottenham Hotspur	Holloway
14:05 GMT	Aubameyang 10' (pen.), 56'; Mustafi (yellow card) 37'; Xhaka (yellow card) 49'; Lacazette 74'; Torreira 77', (yellow card) 78'	Report	Vertonghen (yellow card) 9' (yellow-red card) 85'; Dier 30', (yellow card) 32'; Kane 34' (pen.); Alli (yellow card) 65'; Aurier (yellow card) 90'	Stadium: Emirates Stadium; Attendance: 59,973; Referee: Mike Dean

5 December 2018 15	Manchester United	2–2	Arsenal	Manchester
20:00 GMT	Martial 30'; Rojo (yellow card) 38'; Lingard (yellow card) 40', (goal) 69'; Matić (yellow card) 42'	Report	Mustafi 26', (yellow card) 37'; Bellerín (yellow card) 41'; Rojo 67' (o.g.); Torreira (yellow card) 86'	Stadium: Old Trafford; Attendance: 74,507; Referee: Andre Marriner

8 December 2018 16	Arsenal	1–0	Huddersfield Town	Holloway
15:00 GMT	Xhaka (yellow card) 24'; Lichtsteiner (yellow card) 38'; Papastathopoulos (yellow card) 40'; Mustafi (yellow card) 45+2'; Guendouzi (yellow card) 80'; Torreira 83'	Report	Pritchard (yellow card) 35'; Williams (yellow card) 38'; Smith (yellow card) 39'; Bacuna (yellow card) 85'	Stadium: Emirates Stadium; Attendance: 59,893; Referee: Paul Tierney

16 December 2018 17	Southampton	3–2	Arsenal	Southampton
13:30 GMT	Ings 20', 44'; Bednarek (yellow card) 51'; Armstrong (yellow card) 71'; Austin 85'; Long (yellow card) 90+5'	Report	Mkhitaryan 28', 53'; Koscielny (yellow card) 60'	Stadium: St Mary's Stadium; Attendance: 29,497; Referee: Chris Kavanagh

22 December 2018 18	Arsenal	3–1	Burnley	Holloway
12:30 GMT	Aubameyang 14', 48'; Papastathopoulos (yellow card) 41'; Guendouzi (yellow card) 59'; Iwobi 90+1'	Report	Barnes (yellow card) 36', (goal) 63'; Wood (yellow card) 47'; Mee (yellow card) 60'; Cork (yellow card) 60'; Westwood (yellow card) 90+1'	Stadium: Emirates Stadium; Attendance: 59,493; Referee: Kevin Friend

26 December 2018 19	Brighton & Hove Albion	1–1	Arsenal	Falmer
17:15 GMT	Locadia 35'; Montoya (yellow card) 45+2'; Murray (yellow card) 58'	Report	Aubameyang 7'; Kolašinac (yellow card) 81'	Stadium: Falmer Stadium; Attendance: 30,608; Referee: Anthony Taylor

29 December 2018 20	Liverpool	5–1	Arsenal	Liverpool
17:30 GMT	Firmino 14', 16', 65' (pen.); Robertson (yellow card) 26'; Mané 32'; Salah 45+2' (pen.)	Report	Maitland-Niles 11'; Xhaka (yellow card) 33'; Papastathopoulos (yellow card) 90+2'	Stadium: Anfield; Attendance: 53,326; Referee: Michael Oliver

1 January 2019 21	Arsenal	4–1	Fulham	Holloway
15:00 GMT	Xhaka 25'; Lacazette 55'; Ramsey 79'; Aubameyang 83'	Report	Kamara 69'; Fosu-Mensah (yellow card) 77'	Stadium: Emirates Stadium; Attendance: 59,887; Referee: Graham Scott

12 January 2019 22	West Ham United	1–0	Arsenal	Stratford
12:30 GMT	Rice 48'	Report	Mustafi (yellow card) 46'; Kolašinac (yellow card) 60'	Stadium: London Stadium; Attendance: 59,946; Referee: Jonathan Moss

19 January 2019 23	Arsenal	2–0	Chelsea	Holloway
17:30 GMT	Lacazette 14'; Koscielny 39'	Report	David Luiz (yellow card) 37'; Barkley (yellow card) 90+5'	Stadium: Emirates Stadium; Attendance: 59,979; Referee: Anthony Taylor

29 January 2019 24	Arsenal	2–1	Cardiff City	Holloway
19:45 GMT	Monreal (yellow card) 29'; Guendouzi (yellow card) 45+2'; Aubameyang 66' (pen.); Lacazette (yellow card) 81', (goal) 83'	Report	Paterson (yellow card) 36'; Arter (yellow card) 63'; Ralls (yellow card) 90'; Mendez-Laing 90+3'	Stadium: Emirates Stadium; Attendance: 59,933; Referee: Mike Dean

3 February 2019 25	Manchester City	3–1	Arsenal	Manchester
16:30 GMT	Agüero 1', 44', 61'; Gündoğan (yellow card) 65'	Report	Koscielny 11'; Torreira (yellow card) 40'	Stadium: Etihad Stadium; Attendance: 54,483; Referee: Martin Atkinson

9 February 2019 26	Huddersfield Town	1–2	Arsenal	Huddersfield
15:00 GMT	Schindler (yellow card) 36'; Kongolo (yellow card) 49'; Grant 90+3'; Diakhaby (yellow card) 90+4'	Report	Iwobi 16'; Lacazette 44'; Maitland-Niles (yellow card) 55'; Kolašinac (yellow card) 90+3'	Stadium: John Smith's Stadium; Attendance: 24,182; Referee: Jonathan Moss

24 February 2019 27	Arsenal	2–0	Southampton	Holloway
14:05 GMT	Lacazette 6'; Mkhitaryan 17'	Report		Stadium: Emirates Stadium; Attendance: 59,877; Referee: Graham Scott

27 February 2019 28	Arsenal	5–1	Bournemouth	Holloway
19:45 GMT	Özil 4'; Mkhitaryan 27'; Papastathopoulos (yellow card) 36'; Koscielny 47'; Aubameyang 59'; Torreira (yellow card) 69'; Lacazette 78'	Report	Mousset 30'; King (yellow card) 32'; Daniels (yellow card) 77'	Stadium: Emirates Stadium; Attendance: 59,618; Referee: Chris Kavanagh

2 March 2019 29	Tottenham Hotspur	1–1	Arsenal	Wembley
12:30 GMT	Lamela (yellow card) 63'; Rose (yellow card) 69'; Kane 74' (pen.); Llorente (yellow card) 84'	Report	Ramsey 16'; Mkhitaryan (yellow card) 58'; Xhaka (yellow card) 74'; Aubameyang (penalty missed) 90+1'; Torreira (red card) 90+5'	Stadium: Wembley Stadium; Attendance: 81,332; Referee: Anthony Taylor

10 March 2019 30	Arsenal	2–0	Manchester United	Holloway
16:30 GMT	Xhaka 12'; Papastathopoulos (yellow card) 38'; Aubameyang 69' (pen.); Kolašinac (yellow card) 90'	Report	Matić (yellow card) 68'; Pogba (yellow card) 76'	Stadium: Emirates Stadium; Attendance: 60,000; Referee: Jonathan Moss

1 April 2019 31	Arsenal	2–0	Newcastle United	Holloway
20:00 BST	Ramsey 30'; Monreal (yellow card) 59'; Kolašinac (yellow card) 73'; Lacazette 83'	Report	Diamé (yellow card) 72'	Stadium: Emirates Stadium; Attendance: 59,869; Referee: Anthony Taylor

7 April 2019 32	Everton	1–0	Arsenal	Liverpool
14:05 BST	Jagielka 10'; Gomes (yellow card) 50'	Report	Guendouzi (yellow card) 6'; Papastathopoulos (yellow card) 25'; Mustafi (yellow card) 82'; Monreal (yellow card) 86'	Stadium: Goodison Park; Attendance: 39,400; Referee: Kevin Friend

15 April 2019 33	Watford	0–1	Arsenal	Watford
20:00 BST	Deeney (red card) 11'; Capoue (yellow card) 54'; Hughes (yellow card) 86'	Report	Aubameyang 10'	Stadium: Vicarage Road; Attendance: 20,480; Referee: Craig Pawson

21 April 2019 34	Arsenal	2–3	Crystal Palace	Holloway
16:00 BST	Mavropanos (yellow card) 16'; Özil 47', (yellow card) 63'; Guendouzi (yellow card) 68'; Aubameyang 77'; Mustafi (yellow card) 85'	Report	Benteke 17'; Zaha 61'; McArthur 69'; Ward (yellow card) 81'	Stadium: Emirates Stadium; Attendance: 59,929; Referee: Jonathan Moss

24 April 2019 35	Wolverhampton Wanderers	3–1	Arsenal	Wolverhampton
19:45 BST	Doherty (yellow card) 17', (goal) 37'; Neves 28'; Jota 45+2'; Bennett (yellow card) 84'	Report	Monreal (yellow card) 27'; Xhaka (yellow card) 31'; Torreira (yellow card) 45'; Papastathopoulos 80'	Stadium: Molineux Stadium; Attendance: 31,436; Referee: Stuart Attwell

28 April 2019 36	Leicester City	3–0	Arsenal	Leicester
12:00 BST	Ndidi (yellow card) 13'; Tielemans 59'; Pereira (yellow card) 65'; Chilwell (yellow card) 70'; Vardy 86', 90+5'	Report	Maitland-Niles (yellow card) 8' (yellow-red card) 36'; Papastathopoulos (yellow card) 64'	Stadium: King Power Stadium; Attendance: 32,037; Referee: Michael Oliver

5 May 2019 37	Arsenal	1–1	Brighton & Hove Albion	Holloway
16:30 BST	Aubameyang 9' (pen.); Papastathopoulos (yellow card) 14'; Xhaka (yellow card) 60'; Lichtsteiner (yellow card) 64'; Guendouzi (yellow card) 83'; Mustafi (yellow card) 84'	Report	Groß (yellow card) 45+2'; Murray 61' (pen.); Dunk (yellow card) 63'	Stadium: Emirates Stadium; Attendance: 59,965; Referee: Anthony Taylor

12 May 2019 38	Burnley	1–3	Arsenal	Burnley
15:00 BST	Heaton (yellow card) 3'; Barnes (yellow card) 22', (goal) 65'; Tarkowski (yellow card) 45+3'; Lowton (yellow card) 48'; Cork (yellow card) 75'	Report	Aubameyang 52', 63'; Guendouzi (yellow card) 53'; Nketiah 90+4'	Stadium: Turf Moor; Attendance: 21,461; Referee: Mike Dean

=== FA Cup ===
5 January 2019 Third round	Blackpool	0–3	Arsenal	Blackpool
17:30 GMT		Report	Willock 11', 37'; Kolašinac (yellow card) 56'; Iwobi 82'	Stadium: Bloomfield Road; Attendance: 8,955; Referee: Mike Dean

25 January 2019 Fourth round	Arsenal	1–3	Manchester United	Holloway
19:55 GMT	Aubameyang 43'; Koscielny (yellow card) 54'; Kolašinac (yellow card) 86'; Guendouzi (yellow card) 90+1'	Report	Sánchez 31'; Lingard 33', (yellow card) 76'; Young (yellow card) 68'; Martial 82'; Rashford (yellow card) 86'	Stadium: Emirates Stadium; Attendance: 59,571; Referee: Craig Pawson

=== EFL Cup ===
26 September 2018 Third round	Arsenal	3–1	Brentford	Holloway
19:45 BST	Welbeck 5', 37', (yellow card) 63'; Lichtsteiner (yellow card) 28'; Lacazette 90+3'	Report	Konsa (yellow card) 37'; Judge 58'	Stadium: Emirates Stadium; Attendance: 49,586; Referee: Mike Dean

31 October 2018 Fourth round	Arsenal	2–1	Blackpool	Holloway
19:45 GMT	Guendouzi (yellow card) 22' (yellow-red card) 56'; Lichtsteiner 33'; Jenkinson (yellow card) 45+2'; Smith Rowe 50'	Report	O'Connor 66', (red card) 84'	Stadium: Emirates Stadium; Attendance: 48,168; Referee: David Coote

19 December 2018 Quarter-finals	Arsenal	0–2	Tottenham Hotspur	Holloway
19:45 GMT	Guendouzi (yellow card) 45+2'; Xhaka (yellow card) 77'	Report	Son 21'; Alli 59', (yellow card) 85'; Eriksen (yellow card) 90+4'	Stadium: Emirates Stadium; Attendance: 59,016; Referee: Jonathan Moss

=== UEFA Europa League ===
==== Group stage ====
Pos	Team	Pld	W	D	L	GF	GA	GD	Pts	Qualification	ARS	SPO	VOR	QRB
1	(England) Arsenal	6	5	1	0	12	2	+10	16	Advance to knockout phase	—	0–0	4–2	1–0
2	(Portugal) Sporting CP	6	4	1	1	13	3	+10	13	Advance to knockout phase	0–1	—	3–0	2–0
3	(Ukraine) Vorskla Poltava	6	1	0	5	4	13	−9	3 (Note: Goal difference in all group matches: Vorskla Poltava –9, Qarabağ –11.)		0–3	1–2	—	0–1
4	(Azerbaijan) Qarabağ	6	1	0	5	2	13	−11	3		0–3	1–6	0–1	—

Source: UEFA
Rules for classification: Group stage tiebreakers
Notes:

20 September 2018 1	Arsenal (England)	4–2	(Ukraine) Vorskla Poltava	London, England
21:00 CEST	Aubameyang 32', 56'; Welbeck 48'; Özil 74'	Report	Sharpar (yellow card) 19', (goal) 90+3'; Chesnakov 77'	Stadium: Emirates Stadium; Attendance: 59,039; Referee: Bart Vertenten (Belgium)

4 October 2018 2	Qarabağ (Azerbaijan)	0–3	(England) Arsenal	Baku, Azerbaijan
18:55 CEST	Medvedev (yellow card) 33'	Report	Papastathopoulos 4'; Holding (yellow card) 43'; Smith Rowe 53'; Guendouzi 80'	Stadium: Olympic Stadium; Attendance: 63,412; Referee: Davide Massa (Italy)

25 October 2018 3	Sporting CP (Portugal)	0–1	(England) Arsenal	Lisbon, Portugal
18:55 CEST	Acuña (yellow card) 39'; Coates (yellow card) 71'; Cabral (yellow card) 90'; Battaglia (yellow card) 90'	Report	Holding (yellow card) 46'; Mkhitaryan (yellow card) 51'; Welbeck 78'	Stadium: Estádio José Alvalade; Attendance: 40,784; Referee: Damir Skomina (Slovenia)

8 November 2018 4	Arsenal (England)	0–0	(Portugal) Sporting CP	London, England
21:00 CET	Lichtsteiner (yellow card) 21'; Guendouzi (yellow card) 72'	Report	Gaspar (yellow card) 41'; Acuña (yellow card) 67'; Luís (yellow card) 74'; Mathieu (red card) 87'	Stadium: Emirates Stadium; Attendance: 59,758; Referee: Gediminas Mažeika (Lithuania)

29 November 2018 5	Vorskla Poltava (Ukraine)	0–3	(England) Arsenal	Kyiv, Ukraine
18:55 CET	Sklyar (yellow card) 29'; Sharpar (yellow card) 32'; Kolomoyets (yellow card) 72'	Report	Smith Rowe 11'; Ramsey 27' (pen.); Willock 41'; Holding (yellow card) 53'	Stadium: NSC Olimpiyskiy Stadium; Attendance: 7,751; Referee: Bartosz Frankowski (Poland)

13 December 2018 6	Arsenal (England)	1–0	(Azerbaijan) Qarabağ	London, England
21:00 CET	Lacazette 16'	Report	Qarayev (yellow card) 82'	Stadium: Emirates Stadium; Attendance: 58,101; Referee: Jens Maae (Denmark)

==== Knockout phase ====
===== Round of 32 =====
14 February 2019 First leg	BATE Borisov (Belarus)	1–0	(England) Arsenal	Barysaw, Belarus
18:55 CET (UTC+1)	Drahun 45', (yellow card) 87'; Dubajić (yellow card) 72'; Filipović (yellow card) 86'	Report	Xhaka (yellow card) 9'; Lacazette (red card) 85'	Stadium: Borisov Arena; Attendance: 12,527; Referee: Srđan Jovanović (Serbia)

21 February 2019 Second leg	Arsenal (England)	3–0 (3–1 agg.)	(Belarus) BATE Borisov	London, England
18:55 CET (UTC+1)	Volkov 4' (o.g.); Mustafi 39'; Papastathopoulos 60'	Report		Stadium: Emirates Stadium; Attendance: 58,812; Referee: Alberto Undiano Mallenco (Spain)

===== Round of 16 =====
7 March 2019 First leg	Rennes (France)	3–1	(England) Arsenal	Rennes, France
18:55 CET (UTC+1)	Bourigeaud (yellow card) 38', (goal) 42'; Monreal 65' (o.g.); Zeffane (yellow card) 87'; Sarr 88'	Report	Iwobi 4'; Papastathopoulos (yellow card) 34' (yellow-red card) 41'; Xhaka (yellow card) 61'	Stadium: Roazhon Park; Attendance: 29,100; Referee: Ivan Kružliak (Slovakia)

14 March 2019 Second leg	Arsenal (England)	3–0 (4–3 agg.)	(France) Rennes	London, England
21:00 CET (UTC+1)	Aubameyang 5', 72', (yellow card) 72'; Maitland-Niles 15'; Lacazette (yellow card) 31'; Mkhitaryan (yellow card) 77'; Kolašinac (yellow card) 90+3'	Report	Mexer (yellow card) 18'; Grenier (yellow card) 55'; Bourigeaud (yellow card) 81'; Traoré (yellow card) 90+5'	Stadium: Emirates Stadium; Attendance: 59,453; Referee: Andris Treimanis (Latvia)

===== Quarter-finals =====
11 April 2019 First leg	Arsenal (England)	2–0	(Italy) Napoli	London, England
21:00 CEST (UTC+2)	Ramsey 15'; Koulibaly 25' (o.g.)	Report	Hysaj (yellow card) 47'	Stadium: Emirates Stadium; Attendance: 59,738; Referee: Alberto Undiano Mallenco (Spain)

18 April 2019 Second leg	Napoli (Italy)	0–1 (0–3 agg.)	(England) Arsenal	Naples, Italy
21:00 CEST (UTC+2)	Insigne (yellow card) 43'; Callejón (yellow card) 90'	Report	Lacazette 36'; Čech (yellow card) 74'	Stadium: Stadio San Paolo; Attendance: 39,438; Referee: Ovidiu Hațegan (Romania)

===== Semi-finals =====
2 May 2019 First leg	Arsenal (England)	3–1	(Spain) Valencia	London, England
20:00 BST (UTC+1)	Lacazette 18', 26'; Aubameyang 90+1'	Report	Diakhaby 11', (yellow card) 31'; Parejo (yellow card) 70'	Stadium: Emirates Stadium; Attendance: 58,969; Referee: Clément Turpin (France)

9 May 2019 Second leg	Valencia (Spain)	2–4 (3–7 agg.)	(England) Arsenal	Valencia, Spain
21:00 CEST (UTC+2)	Gameiro 11', 58'; Garay (yellow card) 38'; Gayà (yellow card) 43'; Gabriel (yellow card) 90+2'	Report	Aubameyang 17', 69', 88'; Lacazette 50', (yellow card) 90+2'; Özil (yellow card) 62'	Stadium: Mestalla; Attendance: 44,481; Referee: Danny Makkelie (Netherlands)

===== Final =====
29 May 2019 Final	Chelsea (England)	4–1	(England) Arsenal	Baku, Azerbaijan
21:00 CEST (UTC+2)	Giroud 49'; Pedro (yellow card) 56', (goal) 60'; Hazard 65' (pen.), 72'; Christensen (yellow card) 68'	Report	Iwobi 69'	Stadium: Olympic Stadium; Attendance: 51,370; Referee: Gianluca Rocchi (Italy)

== Coaching staff ==
Updated 19 July 2018.

Position	Name
Head Coach	(Spain) Unai Emery
First Team Assistant Head Coach	(Spain) Juan Carlos Carcedo
First Team Assistant Head Coach	(England) Steve Bould
First Team Coach	(Spain) Pablo Villa
Goalkeeping Coach	(Spain) Javi García
Goalkeeping Coach	(England) Sal Bibbo
Head of Football	(Spain) Raúl Sanllehí
Head of Recruitment	Vacant
Chief Contract Negotiator	(England) Hussein Fahmy
Head of Coach and Player Development	(Netherlands) Marcel Lucassen
Head of Academy	(Germany) Per Mertesacker
Head of Academy Football Operations	(England) Lee Herron
Director of High Performance	(Australia) Darren Burgess
Head of Performance	(United States) Shad Forsythe
Head of Medical Services	(Republic of Ireland) Gary O'Driscoll
Head Physiotherapist	(England) Chris Morgan
First Team Physiotherapist	(Portugal) Paulo Barreira
First Team Physiotherapist	(England) Jordan Reece
First Team Rehab Physiotherapist	(Australia) Tim Parham
Strength and Conditioning Coach	(Spain) Julen Masach
Strength and Conditioning Coach	(Republic of Ireland) Barry Solan
Masseur	(England) Darren Page
Soft Tissue Therapist	(Japan) Takahiro Yamamoto
Kit Manager	(England) Paul Akers
Performance Nutritionist	(England) Richard Allison
Sport Scientist	(England) Tom Allen
Data Scientist	(Russia) Mikhail Zhilkin
Data/Video Analyst	(Spain) Victor Manas
Senior Football Analyst	(England) Ben Knapper
First Team Analyst	(England) Mark Curtis
Football Analyst Assistant	(England) Sam Hayball

== Awards ==
=== Arsenal Player of the Month award ===
Awarded monthly to the player that was chosen by fan voting on Arsenal.com

Month	Player	Votes
August	(France) Matteo Guendouzi	68%
September	(France) Alexandre Lacazette	59%
October	(Gabon) Pierre-Emerick Aubameyang	55%
November	(Uruguay) Lucas Torreira	70%
December	(Gabon) Pierre-Emerick Aubameyang	41%
January	(France) Alexandre Lacazette	65%
February	(Armenia) Henrikh Mkhitaryan	40%
March	(Germany) Bernd Leno	70%

=== Arsenal Goal of the Month award ===
Awarded monthly to the goal that was chosen by fan voting on Arsenal.com

Month	Player	Competition	Opponent	Votes
August	(Armenia) Henrikh Mkhitaryan	Premier League	Chelsea	61%
September	(France) Alexandre Lacazette	Premier League	Everton	57%
October	(Wales) Aaron Ramsey	Premier League	Fulham	38%
November	(France) Alexandre Lacazette	Premier League	Liverpool	71%
December	(Armenia) Henrikh Mkhitaryan	Premier League	Southampton	40%
January	(France) Alexandre Lacazette	Premier League	Chelsea	56%
February	(Germany) Mesut Özil	Premier League	AFC Bournemouth	40%
March	(Wales) Aaron Ramsey	Premier League	Tottenham Hotspur	46%

== Sponsorship ==
Lead sponsors	Global sponsors
Emirates (main sponsor); Puma (kit manufacturer); Visit Rwanda (left sleeve sponsor)	Acronis; Betconstruct; BYD; Cover-More; Gatorade; Vitality; WorldRemit; Zoom
