= Macherey =

Macherey is a surname. Notable people with the surname include:

- Heribert Macherey (born 1954), German footballer
- Pierre Macherey (born 1938), French literary critic
