= Neymargate =

Association football controversy

Neymargate, Neymar-Gate, or Neymar Case refers to the controversy surrounding the transfer of Brazilian footballer Neymar to FC Barcelona in 2013. The case led to the resignation of the club’s then-president, Sandro Rosell.

== The case ==
In May 2013, FC Barcelona announced the signing of Neymar from Santos FC for €57.1 million (approximately R$182 million), making it the 11th most expensive transfer in football history at the time. Of this amount, the club paid €17.1 million to Santos and €40 million to a company allegedly owned by Neymar's father. However, as this amount was considered suspiciously low—given that Real Madrid reportedly also made an offer for the player—the Spanish newspaper El Mundo reported on January 20, 2014, that Barcelona had diverted €38 million (R$121 million) in the transfer process.

The discrepancies raised questions. According to El Mundo:

"It was striking when Barcelona announced Neymar's signing for €57 million—a seemingly low figure considering the prices often quoted in football and Neymar’s prestige in Brazilian football. It became even more suspicious when Florentino Pérez, president of Real Madrid, made an offer of €150 million around the same time. Barcelona members requested transparency regarding the actual cost of the transfer. When we accessed the documents, it became evident that the amount was much higher than officially disclosed. The total sum was €95 million."

The investigation began in December 2013 when Jordi Cases, a Barcelona member, filed a legal complaint demanding clarity over alleged irregularities in Neymar's transfer. Cases accused Sandro Rosell of failing to disclose the full amount paid for the player.

In January 2014, El Mundo published details of Neymar's contract, revealing that while Barcelona officially claimed the transfer cost was €57.1 million, the actual amount was closer to €92 million. As the legal probe deepened, Rosell resigned as president of Barcelona, stating he wanted to "preserve the club as much as possible" amidst what he expected to be a prolonged legal battle. On the same day, Neymar posted a smiling photo on Instagram, sparking criticism from the Spanish press.

== Post-Rosell developments ==
Following Rosell's resignation, Jordi Cases withdrew his complaint, expressing concerns that his actions might harm Barcelona. Despite this withdrawal, the investigation continued, as the Spanish National Court Judge Pablo Ruz had already accepted the case.

On January 24, 2014, Barcelona’s financial director, Raul Sanllehí, disclosed the full costs of Neymar's transfer. According to Sanllehí, the total expenditure amounted to €88.4 million (approximately R$291 million). The difference between the reported figures and actual costs stemmed from friendly matches against Santos, which had been erroneously included in Neymar's transfer value. Sanllehí revealed that Neymar's father requested transparency in the financial details to address public accusations.

In February 2014, Barcelona admitted to paying €13.5 million (around R$43 million) in back taxes related to Neymar’s transfer after Judge Pablo Ruz determined that some of the payments were taxable income. With this additional payment, Neymar’s transfer cost increased to €99.7 million (R$320 million), making him the most expensive player in football history at the time.

In September 2014, Judge Pablo Ruz dismissed claims of embezzlement against Barcelona executives Josep Maria Bartomeu and Javier Faus, stating insufficient evidence of active involvement. However, Ruz left open the possibility of further indictments if financial damages to the club could be quantified.

In December 2016, the Barcelona Court finalized a settlement with Spanish authorities, requiring the club to pay €6 million (R$21 million) in penalties, considering mitigating factors such as damage repair and preventative measures.

== Repercussions ==
The Neymar case triggered several significant consequences:

1. Legal Challenges in Brazil: Santos FC and Grupo Sonda, which had ownership stakes in Neymar's rights, sought legal recourse to claim additional compensation. If the transfer value was proven higher than disclosed, they stood to receive a larger share.
2. Ethical Concerns: The agreement between Barcelona and Neymar's representatives occurred when Santos and Barcelona were potential competitors in the 2011 FIFA Club World Cup final, raising ethical questions.
3. FIFA Regulations: Barcelona's €10 million payment to Neymar's father in 2011 potentially violated FIFA rules prohibiting pre-contracts with players under contract for more than six months. The case raised concerns over possible sanctions. In January 2017, Barcelona admitted to finalizing Neymar's transfer in December 2011—well before the permissible period—heightening scrutiny.

== Investigation by Brazilian authorities ==
In January 2014, Neymar's father held a press conference to clarify the transfer details, aligning with Barcelona’s disclosed figures. However, Brazil’s Federal Public Prosecutor's Office announced an investigation into possible tax crimes during the transfer. Under Brazilian law, if found guilty, Neymar’s father could face up to five years in prison, along with a fine.

In 2017, Brazil’s Administrative Council of Tax Appeals (CARF) imposed a R$188.8 million fine on Neymar for omitting R$65 million in income during his transfer, later adjusted to approximately R$200 million with interest.

According to Globoesporte.com, the accusations against the athlete include:

1. Acquisition of image rights by Santos;
2. Monthly payments made by Santos for image rights;
3. A right of first refusal paid by Barcelona;
4. Hiring Neymar’s father’s company for scouting services;
5. Monthly payments made by Barcelona for image rights.

== Statistical insights ==
With a transfer value of €88.4 million, Neymar was initially considered the second most expensive player in history at the time. However, since this figure was only revealed after the transfer of Welshman Gareth Bale to Real Madrid, Neymar's transfer then became the third most expensive in history. In February 2014, after Barcelona paid €13.5 million in taxes, Neymar officially became the most expensive player in football history, surpassing Gareth Bale.

According to Spanish media, the new contract revealed that Neymar had the third-highest salary in the team, behind only Messi and Iniesta. However, as reported by ESPN.com.br, when additional "opaque" clauses in the contract are included—such as €2 million (R$ 6.8 million) for scouting new talent for Santos, €4 million (R$ 13.6 million) for Brazilian corporate advertising campaigns, and €2.5 million (R$ 8.5 million) for social projects aimed at helping children in São Paulo’s favelas—Neymar’s annual salary surpasses even that of Lionel Messi.
