= Heribert Macherey =

German footballer

Personal information
- Date of birth: 3 November 1954 (age 71)
- Place of birth: Oberhausen, West Germany
- Height: 1.83 m (6 ft 0 in)
- Position: Goalkeeper

Youth career
- SG Osterfeld

Senior career*
Years	Team	Apps	(Gls)
–1983	SF Hamborn 07		
1983–1993	MSV Duisburg	264	(0)
- * Club domestic league appearances and goals

Heribert Macherey (born 3 November 1954) is a German former footballer who played as a goalkeeper. He became the second goalkeeper after Dirk Krüssenberg to keep a clean sheet in his three first Bundesliga games.
