= Raul Sanllehi =

Spanish football administrator

Raúl Sanllehí
- Born: 18 September 1966 (age 59); Barcelona, Spain

Raúl Sanllehí (born 18 September 1966) is a Spanish football administrator and former Head of Football at Arsenal and Director of Football at Barcelona, and formerly the President of Football Operations at Inter Miami. Sanllehi initially joined Arsenal in February 2018 as Head of Football Relations, and was promoted to the Head of Football role following the departure of CEO Ivan Gazidis. He left Arsenal on 15 August 2020.

In April 2022, he joined Real Zaragoza as a CEO. He left his position upon the expiry of his contract in June 2024.

In July 2024, Sanllehí joined Inter Miami as President of Football Operations. However, he was replaced by the club's academy director, Guillermo Hoyos, in January 2025.
