= Dirk Krüssenberg =

German footballer

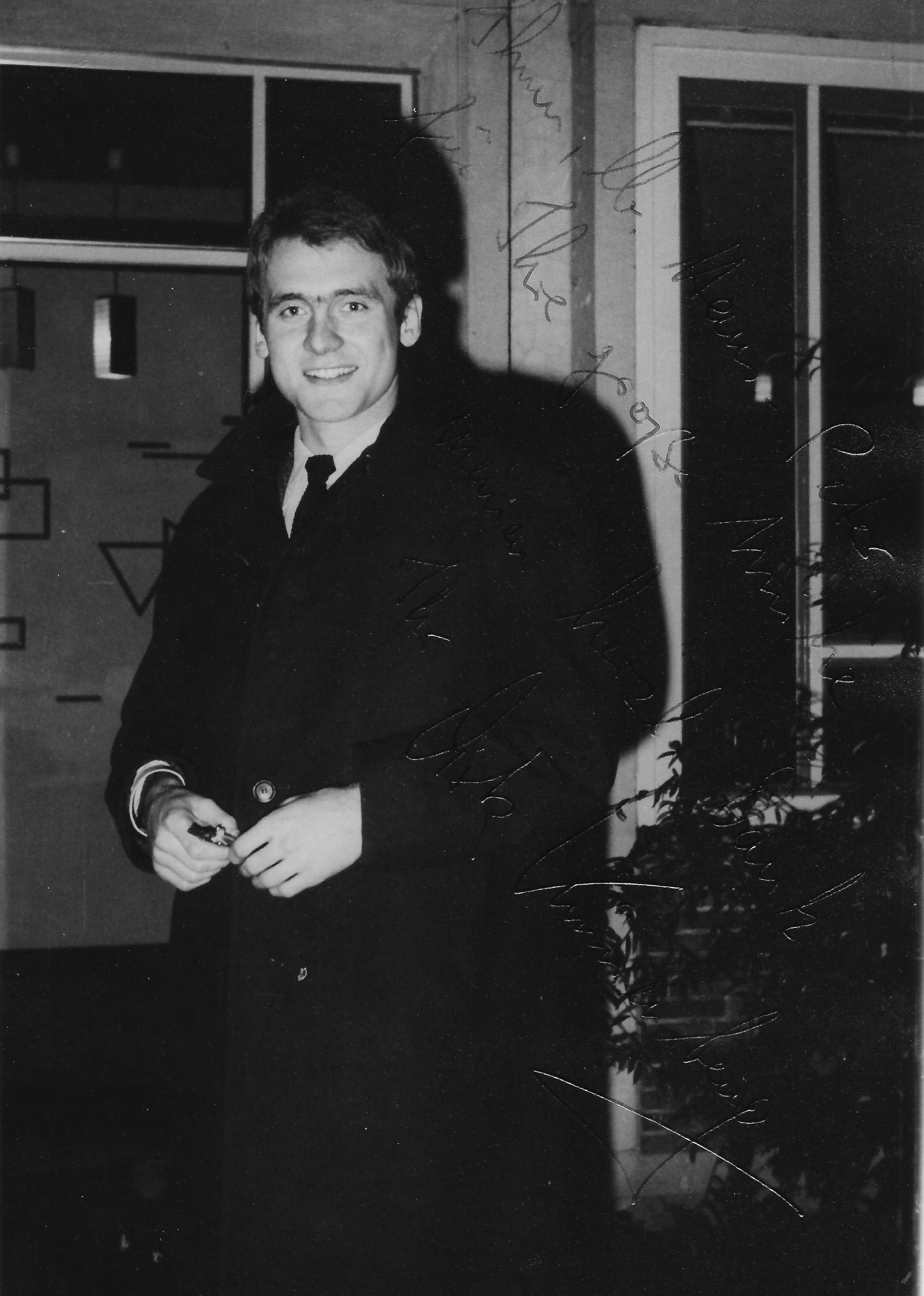
- Krüssenberg in 1967

Personal information
- Date of birth: 29 September 1945 (age 81)
- Place of birth: Germany
- Height: 1.81 m (5 ft 11 in)
- Position: Goalkeeper

Senior career*
Years	Team	Apps	(Gls)
1964–1967	Fortuna Düsseldorf	59	(0)
1967–1969	SpVgg Fürth	27	(0)
Total		86	(0)
- * Club domestic league appearances and goals

Dirk Krüssenberg (born 29 September 1945) is a German former footballer who played as a goalkeeper. He is the first goalkeeper in Bundesliga history who was keeping a clean sheet in his three first Bundesliga games.
