= Arch (disambiguation) =

An arch a curved vertical structure spanning an open space underneath it.

Arch, Arches, or The Arch may also refer to:

== Arts, entertainment and media ==
- Arches (Lerdahl), a 2010 musical composition
- Arch (sculpture), in Lynden Sculpture Garden near Milwaukee, Wisconsin, US
- ARCH+, a German magazine for architecture
- The Arch (nightclub), a nightclub in Brighton, England
- The Arch, a theatre space in Holden Street Theatres, Adelaide, Australia
- The Arch (film), a 1968 Hong Kong drama film
- WARH, a radio station serving St. Louis, Missouri, branded "106.5 The Arch"

== People ==
- Arch (name), a list of people with the given name or surname
- E. L. Arch, a pen name of American novelist Rachel Cosgrove Payes (1922–1998)

== Places ==
- Arch, Switzerland
- Arches, Cantal, France
- Arches, Vosges, France
- Arches National Park, Utah, United States
- Arch Islands, Falkland Islands
- Arch Street (Philadelphia), Pennsylvania, United States

== Science and technology ==
- Arches of the foot
- Arch (fingerprint), a basic pattern
- Arch, the protein archaerhodopsin-3, used for research in optogenetics
- Arch Linux, a Linux distribution
- GNU arch, a distributed revision control system
- Autoregressive conditional heteroskedasticity, in econometrics

== Structures ==
- Gateway Arch, a monument in St. Louis, Missouri, US
- The Arch (Hong Kong), a residential skyscraper
- The Arch, a symbolic structure at University of Georgia

== Other uses ==
- Arch (horse), an American Thoroughbred racehorse
- Arches Cluster, a star cluster in the Milky Way
- Arch Resources, an American coal mining and processing company
- Inverted breve, or arch, a diacritic sign
- arch-, a taxonomic affix
- ARCH Air Medical Service, in Missouri, Illinois, US
- USS Arch, original name of the Soviet minesweeper T-117
- Arches paper, a brand of art and writing paper

== See also ==
- Arc (disambiguation)
- Arche (disambiguation)
- Arch of Triumph (disambiguation)
- Arch Creek (disambiguation)
- Arch Rock (disambiguation)
- Archway (disambiguation)
- Arch 22, a commemorative arch in The Gambia
- Branchial arch, a series of bony loop present in fish which support the gills
- Natural arch or rock arch, a natural landform
