= Nagambie Football Club =

Nagambie Football / Netball Club
- Watsonia Football Club

Names
- Full name: Nagambie Football / Netball Club
- Nickname: The Lakers

Club details
- Founded: 1881; 145 years ago
- Colours
- Competition: Kyabram District Football League
- Premierships: (22): 1905, 1906, 1907, 1908, 1919, 1938, 1939, 1946, 1947, 1965, 1967, 1969, 1970, 1975, 1977, 1998, 1999, 2010, 2014, 2016, 2017, 2019
- Ground: Nagambie Recreation Reserve (capacity: 5,000)

Uniforms
Home

Other information
- Official website: Nagambie FNC website

Nagambie Football Club is an Australian rules football club, that was established in 1881. The club is based in the North Eastern Victorian town of Nagambie.

== History ==
The first recorded match involving Nagambie was in 1881, when The Age newspaper reported of an Australian Rules football match between Seymour and Nagambie.

In 1882, the club played on the paddock of Mr. J. Swift - Esquire.

At the club's 1888 annual meeting, it was decided to join the North Eastern Football Association.

In 1890, the club was known as the Nagambie Ramblers.

In 1891, Nagambie finished in the North Eastern Football Association.

In 1909, the club had the same colours as Longwood Football Club, so they changed its colors to blue with a gold band, with green stockings.

In 1912, Nagambie joined the Goulburn Valley District Football Association.

In 1915, two former Nagambie players, Private Fen McDonald and Private C. Coe were killed in action on the Gallopli Peninsula.

Nagambie senior football team were undefeated in 1938, 1939 & experienced their first loss in three years on Saturday, 3 August 1940 from Benalla Football Club, who won by 14 points in Benalla.

In 1946, Nagambie FC rover and 1949 captain, Tommy Deane won the 1946 Stawell Gift.

The club is known as "The Lakers" and wear red, white and black panels similar to the Saints guernsey. Their most recent premiership success was in the 2019 season against Tallygaroopna.

== Football Timeline ==
- 1881 - 1887: Club active, but did not play in any official competition
- 1888 - North Eastern Football Association
- 1889 - Club active, but did not play in any official competition
- 1890 - 1892: North Eastern Football Association
- 1893 - 1894: North Eastern Football Association
- 1895 - 1896: Club active, but did not play in any official competition
- 1897 - Upper Goulburn Football Association
- 1898 - 1903: North Eastern Football Association
- 1904 - 1906: Waranga Football Association
- 1907 - 1911: North Eastern Football Association
- 1912 - Goulburn Valley District Football Association
- 1913 - 1914: Waranga North East Football Association
- 1915 - 1918: Association / Club in recess due to WW1
- 1919 - 1938: Waranga North East Football Association
- 1939 - 1940: Goulburn Valley Football League
- 1941 - 1945: League / Club in recess due to WW2
- 1946 - 1964: Goulburn Valley Football League
- 1965 - 2019: Kyabram District Football League
- 2020 - 2021: League / Club in recess due to COVID-19
- 2022 - 2024: Kyabram District Football League

== Football Premierships ==
Seniors

- Waranga Football Association
  - 1905,
  - 1906,
- North East Football Association
  - 1907 - Nagambie: 7.11 - 53 d Tallarook: 7.7 - 49
  - 1908 - Nagambie: 7.12 - 54 d Broadford: 4.7 - 31
- Waranga North East Football Association
  - 1919 - Nagambie: 8.10 - 58 d Avenel: 6.9 - 45
  - 1938 - Nagambie: 15.9 - 99 d Yea: 10.9 - 69 (undefeated premiers).
- Goulburn Valley Football League
  - 1939 - Nagambie: 10.10 - 70 d Rushworth: 9.11 - 65 (undefeated premiers).
  - 1946 - Nagambie: 20.13 - 133 d Camp 13: 14.16 - 100
  - 1947 - Nagambie: 9.8 - 62 d Kyabram: 9.7 - 61
- Kyabram District Football League
  - 1965 - Nagambie: 10.13 - 73 d Tallygaroopna: 9.7 - 61
  - 1967 - Nagambie: 24.19 - 163 d Merrigum: 6.3 - 39
  - 1969 - Nagambie; 11.12 - 78 d Tallygaroopna: 5.6 - 36
  - 1970 - Nagambie: 11.8 - 74 d Undera: 8.9 - 57
  - 1975 - Nagambie: d Merrigum:
  - 1977 - Nagambie: 16.13 - 109 d Avenel: 12.10 - 82
  - 1998 - Nagambie: 10.17 - 77 d Undera: 8.8 - 56
  - 1999 - Nagambie: 24.5 - 149 d Rushworth: 10.6 - 66
  - 2010 - Nagambie: 12.17 - 89 d Undera: 10.14 - 74
  - 2014 - Nagambie: 18.12 - 120 d Merrigum: 13.7 - 85
  - 2016 - Nagambie: 17.16 - 118 d Avenel: 15.10 - 100
  - 2017 - Nagambie: 21.16 - 142 d Violet Town: 13.11 - 89
  - 2019 - Nagambie: 18.9 - 117 d Tallygaroopna: 9.5 - 59

Reserves

- Kyabram District Football League
  - 1983 - Nagambie: 11.12 - 78 d Murchison: 8.6 - 54
  - 2016 - Nagambie: 13.16 - 94 d Tallygaroopna: 6.5 - 41

Thirds

- Kyabram District Football League
  - 1976 - Nagambie: 11.10 - 76 d Undera: 5.8 - 38
  - 1981 - Nagambie: 14.11 - 95 d Murchison: 4.7 - 31
  - 1982 - Nagambie: d Murchison:
  - 2008 - Nagambie: d ?
  - 2022 - Nagambie: 8.6 - 54 d Lancaster: 4.10 - 34
  - 2024 - Nagambie: 10.14 - 74 d Violet Town: 4.6 - 30 (undefeated premiers).

== Football Runners Up ==
Seniors

- Upper Goulburn Football Association
  - 1897
- Waranga North East Football Association
  - 1913,
  - 1920 - Seymour: 5.14 - 44 d Nagambie: 6.6 - 42
  - 1923, 1931, 1933, 1936.
- Kyabram District Football Netball League
  - 1966 - Murchison: 10.15 - 75 d Nagambie: 8.15 - 63
  - 1971 - Tallygaroopna: 11.15 - 81 d Nagambie: 11.8 - 74
  - 1976 - Girgarrie: 17.13 - 115 d Nagambie: 14.13 - 97
  - 1984 - Avenel: 17.9 - 111 d Nagambie: 12.14 - 86
  - 1985 - Avenel: d Nagambie:
  - 2000 - Stanhope: 23.11 - 149 d Nagambie: 11.11 - 77
  - 2009 - Undera: 16. 13 - 109 d Nagambie: 13. 14 - 92
  - 2018 - Tallygaroopna: 11.15 - 81 d Nagambie: 9.6 - 60
  - 2023 - Lancaster: 19.11 - 125 d Nagambie: 8.12 - 60

Reserves

- Kyabram District Football Netball League
  - 1966 -
  - 1971 -
  - 1985 - Avenel d Nagambie:
  - 2000 -

Thirds

- Kyabram District Football Netball League
  - 1970
  - 1977
  - 1978
  - 1985
  - 1998
  - 2005
  - 2009
  - 2013
  - 2023
  - 2025

== League Best & Fairest Awards ==
Senior Football

- Goulburn Valley Football League - Morrison Medal
  - 1956 - Ken Shaw
- Kyabram District Football Netball League - McNamara Medal
  - 1965 - Richard Moore
  - 1974 - Murray Black
  - 1975 - Brian Finnigan
  - 1977 - Tom Gallager
  - 1984 - Edward Shiels
  - 1985 - Murray Black
  - 1986 - Edward Shiels
  - 1992 - Edward Shiels
  - 1993 - Edward Shiels
  - 1998 - Rohan Aldous
  - 1999 - Rohan Aldous
  - 2000 - Rohan Aldous
  - 2007 - Michael Shiels
  - 2014 - Michael Shiels
  - 2024 - Blake Fothergill & Rielly Old

Reserves

- Goulburn Valley Football League - Abikhair Medal
  - 1954 - Ian Sutton
- Kyabram District Football Netball League - Wade Medal
  - 1983 - Brian Reardon
  - 1985 - Guiseppe Gattuso
  - 2016 - Ben Robinson
  - 2018 - Mitchell Sanderson

Thirds

- Kyabram District Football Netball League
  - Wright Medal
    - 1971 - Murray Black
    - 1972 - Murray Black
    - 1973 - Edward Shiels
- Kyabram District Football Netball League
  - Jim Inch Medal
    - 1978 - David Moore
    - 1988 - Simon Gribbin
    - 1996 - Brent Clydesdale
    - 1997 - Robert Lincoln
    - 1998 - Tony D' Andrea
    - 2023 - Blake Ezard

== VFL / AFL Players ==
The following footballers played with Nagambie, prior to playing senior football in the VFL/AFL, and / or drafted, with the year indicating their VFL/AFL debut.

- 1903 - Jack Sullivan - Essendon
- 1905 - Arch McDonald - Essendon
- 1905 - Edwin McDonald - Essendon
- 1911 - Fen McDonald - Essendon
- 1912 - Jack Blencowe - Essendon
- 1913 - Alf Baud - Carlton
- 1927 - Don Wallace - Footscray
- 1936 - Dick Welch - Essendon
- 1944 - Harold McDonald - Carlton
- 1956 - Fred Le Deux - Geelong
- 1961 - Graeme Taylor - Footscray
- 1964 - Rob Taylor - Footscray

== Netball Premierships ==
A. Grade

- Kyabram District Football Netball League
  - 1985, 1995, 1998, 2009, 2012, 2015, 2017

B. Grade

- Kyabram District Football Netball League
  - 1991, 1993, 1994, 1997, 1998, 2000, 2009, 2010, 2023

C. Grade

- Kyabram District Football Netball League
  - 1989, 1991, 1992, 1994, 1997, 2008, 2009, 2018

C. Reserve

- Kyabram District Football Netball League
  - 2025

17 & Under

- Kyabram District Football Netball League
  - 2004, 2005, 2006, 2014, 2015, 2016

Under 16

- Kyabram District Football Netball League
  - 1983, 1986

15 & Under

- Kyabram District Football Netball League
  - 2013, 2014

== Club Honourboard ==
| Year | President | Secretary | Treasurer | Coach | Best & Fairest | Top Goalkicker | Ladder Position |
|---|---|---|---|---|---|---|---|
| 1888 | G Vale | E Wild | W Morrissey | | | | |
| 1889 | G Abberley | W J Sheehan | G Birrell | | | | |
| 1891 | | | | | | | 5th |
| 1897 | | | | | | | 2nd |
| 1898 | | | | | | | |
| 1899 | | | | | | | 3rd |
| 1900 | J P Du Feu | E Brensing | E Brensing | | | | |
| 1901 | E K Crawford | E Brensing | E Brensing | J P Morrisey | | | |
| 1902 | K C Crawford | E Brensing | E Brensing | | | | |
| 1903 | | | | | | | |
| 1904 | | | | | | | |
| 1905 | F C Osborne | W H McLeod | W H McLeod | | | | WFA Premiers |
| 1906 | J P Morrisey | W H McLeod | W H McLeod | | | | WFA Premiers |
| 1907 | R P Mahoney | A I Baud | A I Baud | | | | NEFA Premiers |
| 1908 | E M McDonald | W H McLeod | | | | | NEFA Premiers |
| 1909 | | | | J Larkins | | | |
| 1910 | | A M Oppwood | W H McLeod | S Carmichael | | | |
| 1911 | | | | | | | |
| 1912 | | D Brown | F C Osborne | | | | 6th: 5 wins / 9 losses |
| 1913 | W H McLeod | D Brown | F C Osborne | | | | 2nd |
| 1914 | E McDonald | W R Bourke & | H M Handfield | | | | 3rd |
| | | H Gundry | | | | | |
| 1915 | E McDonald | H Gundry | H M Handfield | | | | |
| 1915-18 | | | | | | | In recess > WW1 |
| 1919 | | | | | | | W&NEFA Premiers |
| 1920 | | | | | | | 2nd |
| 1921 | | | | | | | |
| 1922 | | | | | | | |
| 1923 | | | | | | | 2nd |
| 1924 | | | | | | | 6th |
| 1925 | | | | | | | 4th |
| 1926 | | | | | | | |
| 1927 | | | | | | | 8th: no wins |
| 1928 | | | | | | | 5th |
| 1929 | | | | | | | 6th |
| 1930 | | | | | | | 5th |
| 1931 | | | | | | | 2nd |
| 1932 | | | | | | | 6th |
| 1933 | | | | | | | 2nd |
| 1934 | W.McLure | F.Clarke | | | | | 4th |
| 1935 | | | | | | | 6th |
| 1936 | | | | | | | 2nd |
| 1937 | | | | W Ferguson | Leo Crowe | | 3rd: lost P Final |
| 1938 | | | | | | | W&NEFA Premiers |
| 1939 | | | | | | | GVFL Premiers |
| 1940 | | | | | | | 3rd: Lost P Final |
| 1941-45 | | | | | | | In recess > WW2 |
| 1946 | W.Darbyshire | W.Binion | | | | | 3rd: GVFL Premiers |
| 1947 | | | | J.Zanelli | | | 2nd: GVFL Premiers |
| 1948 | | | | | | | 3rd: |
| 1949 | | | | | | | 7th |
| 1950 | | | | | | | 11th |
| 1951 | | | | | | | 11th |
| 1952 | | | | | | | 9th |
| 1953 | | | | Ken Heims | | | 9th |
| 1954 | | | | | | | 8th |
| 1955 | | | | | | 64: Alan Pickering* | 3rd |
| 1956 | | | | | | 68: Alan Pickering* | |
| 1957 | | | | | | | |
| 1958 | | | | | | | |
| 1959 | | | | | | | |
| 1960 | D.Henderson | W.Kelly | | Richard Moore | Laurie LeDeux | | |
| 1961 | D.Henderson | W.Kelly | | Richard Moore | J.Tasker & A.McIntosh | | |
| 1962 | D.Henderson | Ross Lodding | | Richard Moore | A.Clarke | | |
| 1963 | D.Henderson | Ross Lodding | | Richard Moore | J.Tasker & Brian Lodding | | |
| 1964 | H.Baldwin | Ross Lodding | | Richard Moore | Brian Lodding | | |
| 1965 | K.Young | Greg Fosdick | | Richard Moore | Richard Moore | | KDFNL Premiers |
| 1966 | Ross Lodding | Greg Fosdick | | Richard Moore | A Bayles | 135: Dick Moore* | 2nd |
| 1967 | P.Davidson | C.McComach | | A McIntosh | A Bayles | 49: Brian Lodding* | KDFNL Premiers |
| 1968 | Ross Lodding | Keith Monagetti | | Barry Smith | B Smith | | |
| 1969 | G.McLeod | Maxwell Fothergill | | Barry Smith | B Lodding | 69: Brian Lodding* | KDFNL Premiers |
| 1970 | John Shiels | Maxwell Fothergill | | Barry Smith | B Forbes | | KDFNL Premiers |
| 1971 | J.Smithwick | Maxwell Fothergill | | Barry Smith | Darryl Higgins | | 2nd |
| 1972 | Robert Furhmann | R.Perry | | A Bayles | A Bayles | | |
| 1973 | G.Wood | Maxwell Fothergill | | V Edwards | B Forbes | | |
| 1974 | Les Boyer | Maxwell Fothergill | | P Deane | Murray Black | | |
| 1975 | Les Boyer | Colin FOx | | Brian Finnigan | R Lang | | KDFNL Premiers |
| 1976 | Les Boyer | Colin Fox | | Brian Finnigan | Alan Tranter | | 2nd |
| 1977 | Les Boyer | M.McAliece | | T Gallagher | Edward Shiels | | KDFNL Premiers |
| 1978 | Colin Fox | M.McAliece | | N Trotman | D Tronerud | | |
| 1979 | Ron Bryant | M.Shepard | | D Tronerud | Alistair Purbrick | | |
| 1980 | Ron Bryant | M.McAliece | | Brian Finnigan | Brian Finnigan | | |
| 1981 | Ron Bryant | M.McAliece | | Richard Moore | M Hadley | | |
| 1982 | Alistair Purbrick | I.Walsh | | Linton Gleeson | A McLeod | | |
| 1983 | Alistair Purbrick | I.Walsh | | Linton Gleeson & J Morris | S Clydesdale | | |
| 1984 | Alistair Purbrick | Colin Fox | | Edward Shiels | Edward Shiels | | 2nd |
| 1985 | Alistair Purbrick | | | Edward Shiels | Murray Black | | 2nd |
| 1986 | Geoff Higgins | Colin Fox | | Edward Shiels | Edward Shiels | | |
| 1987 | Geoff Higgins | Colin Fox | | Neil Muir & A White | M Boyer & R Bazeley | | |
| 1988 | Warwick Hutton | D.Mason | | Ray Zelesco | Murray Black | | |
| 1989 | Alan Catterall | D.Mason | | Edward Shiels | Ed Shiels | | |
| 1990 | Geoff Higgins | Desmond Fothergill | | Brett Barnes | Mark Boyer | | |
| 1991 | Colin Fox | Desmond Fothergill | | Barry Smith | Ed Shiels | | |
| 1992 | Desmond Fothergill | Raymond Cassar | | Russell Cole | Ed Shiels | | |
| 1993 | Desmond Fothergill | Raymond Cassar | | Ed Shiels | Ed Shiels | | |
| 1994 | Dilio Scopel | Raymond Cassar | | W Whitburn | S Fox | | |
| 1995 | Dilio Scopel | Desmond Fothergill | | W Whitburn | Adam Dalton | | |
| 1996 | Dilio Scopel | C.Cocking | | M Dickens | Edward Shiels | | |
| 1997 | Dilio Scopel | Colin Fox | | M Dickens | Rohan Aldous | | |
| 1998 | Colin Fox | C.Cocking | | Rohan Aldous | Rohan Aldous | | KDFNL Premiers |
| 1999 | Tracy Lang | Richard Mensfeld | | Robert Auld | Rohan Aldous | | KDFNL Premiers |
| 2000 | Tracy Lang | Richard Mensfeld | | Peter Thorpe | Rohan Aldous | | 2nd |
| 2001 | Warwick Hutton | Graham Jarvis | | K Beasland | A Welsh | | last: no wins |
| 2002 | Warwick Hutton | Graham Jarvis | | Robert Auld | M Roberts | | |
| 2003 | Graham Jarvis | Cheryl Jarvis | | Ross Andrews | Brent Clydesdale | | 6th |
| 2004 | Graham Jarvis | Cheryl Jarvis | | Ross Andrews | Scott Paulke | | |
| 2005 | Warwick Hutton | Graham Jarvis | | Scott Paulke | | | |
| 2006 | Colin Fox | Graham Jarvis | | Ross Andrews | | | Last |
| 2007 | Warwick Hutton | Graham Jarvis | | Gavin Gledhill | | | |
| 2008 | Warwick Hutton | Graham Jarvis | | Gavin Gledhill | Scott Paulke | | |
| 2009 | Warwick Hutton | Michelle Forbes | | Robert Auld | Scott Paulke | 82: Patrick Rattray* | Minor premiers. Runner up |
| 2010 | Warwick Hutton | Michelle Forbes | | Robert Auld | Anthony Haysom | 73: Patrick Rattray* | 3rd: KDFNL Premiers |
| 2011 | Neil Muir | Fiona Smith | | Ed Shiels | Michael Shiels | 44: Jack Williams | 8th |
| 2012 | Neil Muir | Fiona Smith | | Robert Auld | Ben Hutton | 43: Luke Larsen | 3rd |
| 2013 | Robert Auld | Lana Smidt | | Linc Sullivan | Michael Shiels | 55: Daniel Haysom | 4th |
| 2014 | Robert Auld | Lana Smidt | Danielle Auld | Linc Sullivan | David Price | 115: Patrick Rattray* | 2nd: KDFNL Premiers |
| 2015 | Brett Fothergill | Lana Smidt | | Linc Sullivan | David Price | 86: Patrick Rattray* | Minor Premiers>lost both finals |
| 2016 | Brett Fothergill | Sarah Heathcote | | Linc Sullivan | Anthony Haysom | 75: Harley Taylor-Lloyd | 2nd: KDFNL Premiers |
| 2017 | Bradley Gladwin | Sarah Heathcote | | Linc Sullivan | Ben Hutton & Daniel Haysom | 62: Mathew Waterson | 2nd: KDFNL Premiers |
| 2018 | Bradley Gladwin | Danica Worthington | Richard Mensfeld | Linc Sullivan | Anthony Haysom | 78: Mathew Waterson* | 3rd: Runner up |
| 2019 | Barry Cryer | Fiona Merrifield | Katie Sullivan | Anthony Haysom | Blake Fothergill | 49: Anthony Haysom | 2nd: KDFNL Premiers |
| 2020 | Barry Cryer | Fiona Merrifield | Katie Sullivan | | | | In recess>COVID-19 |
| 2021 | Barry Cryer | Rylee Alderton | Katie Sullivan | Linc Sullivan & Darryl Harrison | Jamason Daniels | 22: Nathan Fothergill | 4th |
| 2022 | Barry Cryer | Paul Anderson | Katie Sullivan | Tyrone Muir | Trent Laverie | 35: Jonathon Moore | 7th: Lost Semi Final |
| 2023 | Jacob Lloyd | Fiona Merrifield | Sharni Lloyd | Tyrone Muir | Tom Barnes | 45: William Dalton | 2nd Runner Up |
| 2024 | Jacob Lloyd | Fiona Merrifield | Sharni Lloyd | Harley Taylor - Lloyd | Blake Fothergill | 25: Mark Wilson | 5th: Lost Semi Final |
| 2025 | Jacob Lloyd & Adam Maltman | Fiona Merrifield | Sharni Lloyd | Harley Taylor - Lloyd | Mark Nolan | 48: Tom Barnes | 4th: Lost Semi Final |
| 2026 | Jacob Lloyd & Adam Maltman | Fiona Merrifield | Stefan Gattuso | Anthony Haysom | | | |
| Year | President | Secretary | Treasurer | Coach | Best & Fairest | Top Goalkicker | Ladder Position |

- - * Player also won the Goulburn Valley FNL & / or the Kyabram & DFNL goalkicking award
- Ladder position is at the end of the home & away series of matches
