= Arch (name) =

Arch is a masculine given name and a surname, usually a shortened form of Archibald or Archer.

== People with the given name ==
- Arch Bevis (born 1955), Australian politician
- Arch Bobbitt (1895–1978), American judge
- Arch Corbett (1883–1920), Australian rules footballer
- Arch Crippin (1916–2008), Australian rugby league footballer
- Arch Dale (1882–1962), Scottish editorial cartoonist who sometimes signed his work as "Arch"
- Arch Deal (1931–2020), American newscaster
- Arch Freeman (c. 1890–1918), American aviator
- J. Arch Getty (1950–2025), American historian
- Arch Hall Sr. (1908–1978), American actor, film director, and screenwriter
- Arch Hall Jr. (born 1943), American actor, musician, aviator, and writer
- Arch Higgins, American ballet dancer
- Arch Jelley (1922–2026), New Zealand athletics coach
- Arch Johnson (1922–1997), American actor
- Arch Knott (1916–1998), Australian rules footballer
- Arch MacDonald (1911–1985), American broadcast journalist and television pioneer
- Arch L. Madsen (1913–1997), American broadcast executive
- Arch Manning, American football quarterback
- Arch Martin (1931–2009), American jazz trombonist
- Arch McDonald (1901–1960), American sports announcer
- Arch McDonald (footballer) (1882–1932), Australian rules footballer
- Arch W. McFarlane (1885–1960), American businessman and politician
- Arch McKirdy (1924–2013), Australian radio presenter and broadcasting executive
- Arch Merrill (1894–1974), American journalist and author
- Arch A. Moore Jr. (1923–2015), American lawyer, politician and convicted felon
- Arch Muirhead (1876–1958), Australian rules footballer
- Arch Nicholson (1941–1990), Australian film director
- Arch Oboler (1909–1987), American playwright, screenwriter, novelist, producer and director
- Arch Pafford, Canadian politician
- Arch Presby (1907–2007), Canadian-American radio and television announcer
- Arch Reilly (1891–1963), American baseball player
- Arch Wilkinson Shaw (1876–1962), American publisher and business theorist
- Arch B. Swank Jr. (1913–1999), American architect
- Arch Thompson, Australian rugby league footballer
- Arch Ward (1896–1955), sports editor for the Chicago Tribune newspaper
- Arch West (1914–2011), American marketing executive
- Arch Colson Whitehead (born 1960), American novelist
- Arch Whitehouse (1895–1979), British aviator and author
- Arch Whiting (1936–2007), American actor
- Arch Wilder (1917–2002), Canadian ice hockey player
- Arch G. Woodside (born 1943), American marketing consultant and author

== People with the surname ==
- Hannes Arch (1967–2016), Austrian air racer and 2008 world champion
- John Arch (John Maurice Archambault, born 1959), American singer
- John Arch (politician) (born 1964), American politician
- Joseph Arch (1826–1919), English politician

== See also ==
- J. Arch Getty (1950–2025), American historian and professor
- Archie
