= Gibson Park =

Park in Great Falls, Montana, US

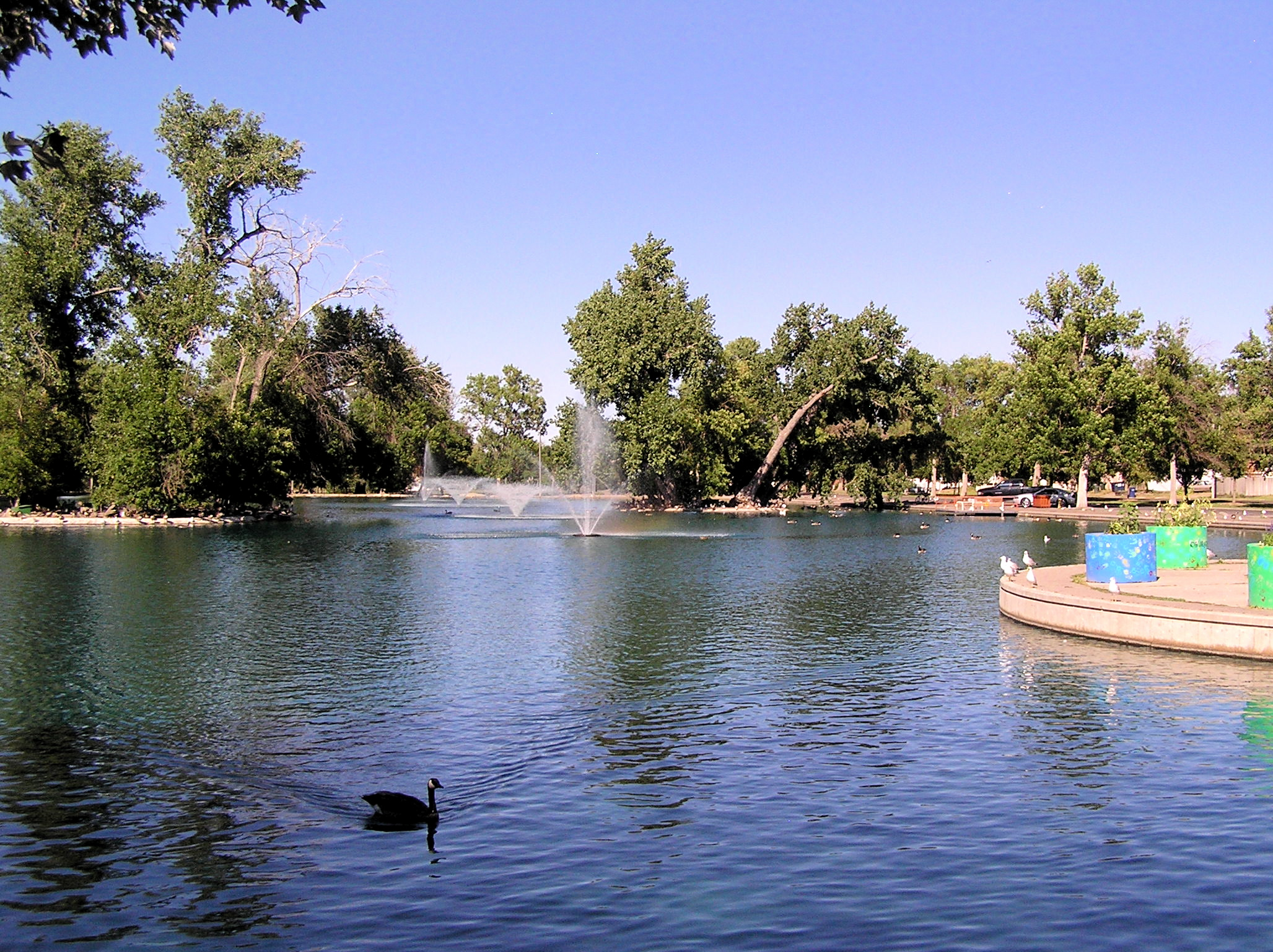
- Duck pond 3
- Interactive map of Gibson Park
- Type: recreational
- Location: Great Falls, Montana
- Coordinates: 47.3056°N 111.8215°W
- Established: 1903
- Etymology: Paris Gibson
- Manager: Great Falls Park System
- Open: Year-round
- Website: https://www.greatfallsmt.gov/Facilities/Facility/Details/Gibson-Park-18

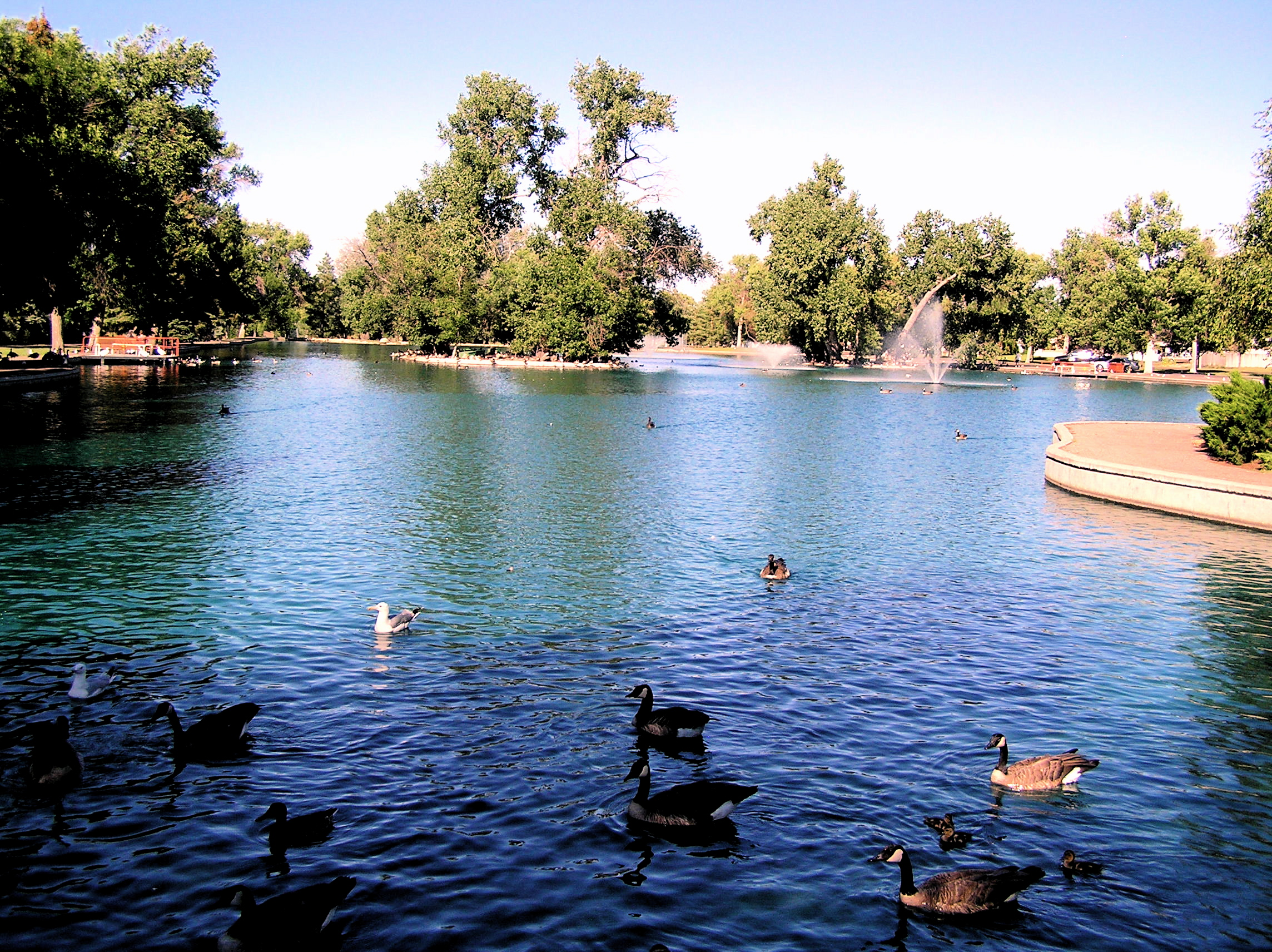
the duck pond at Gibson Park

Gibson Park is a park in Great Falls, Montana. The park offers recreational activities and is known by many as the "jewel of the Great Falls park system".

== History ==
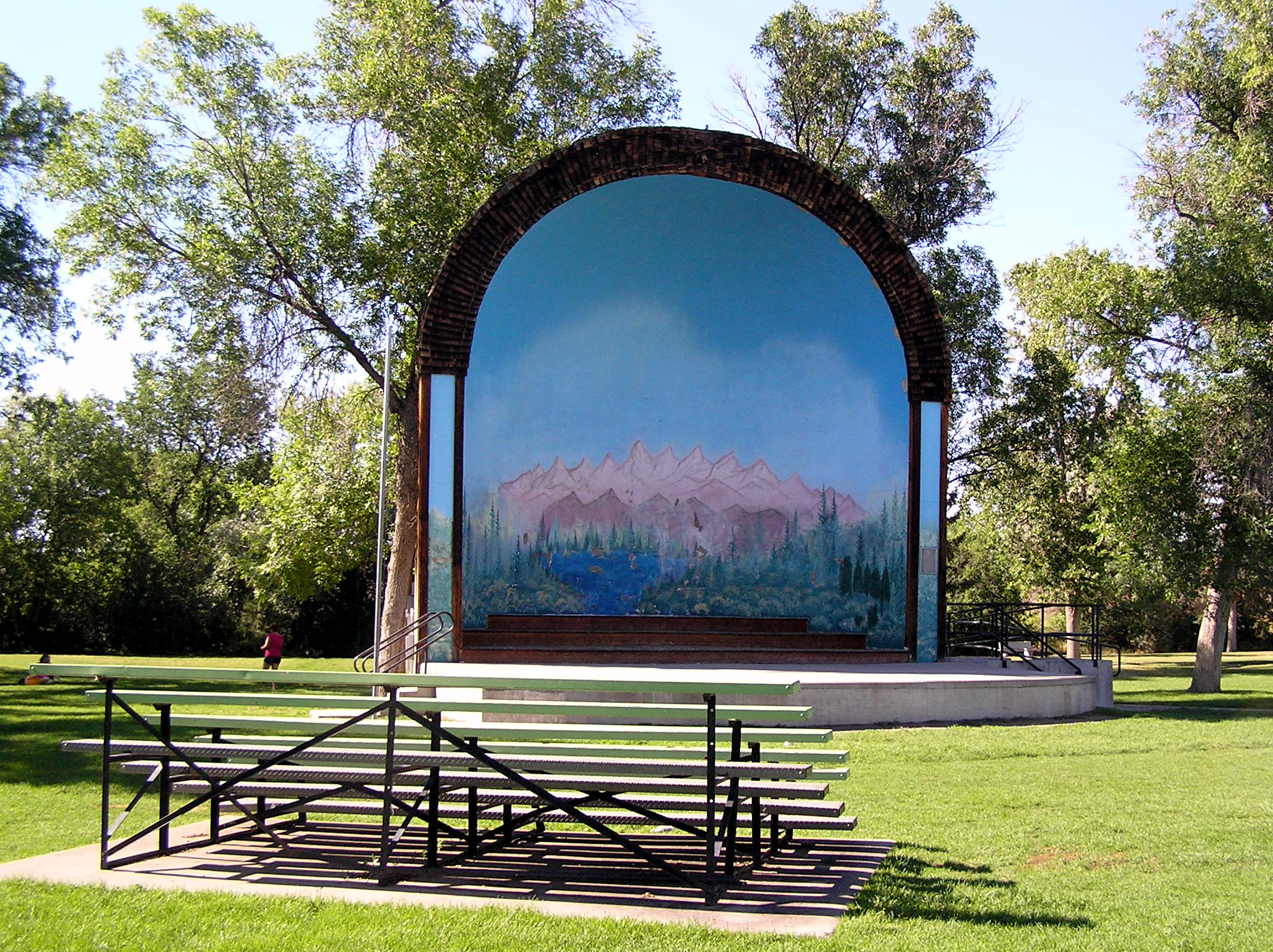
a concert area at Gibson Park

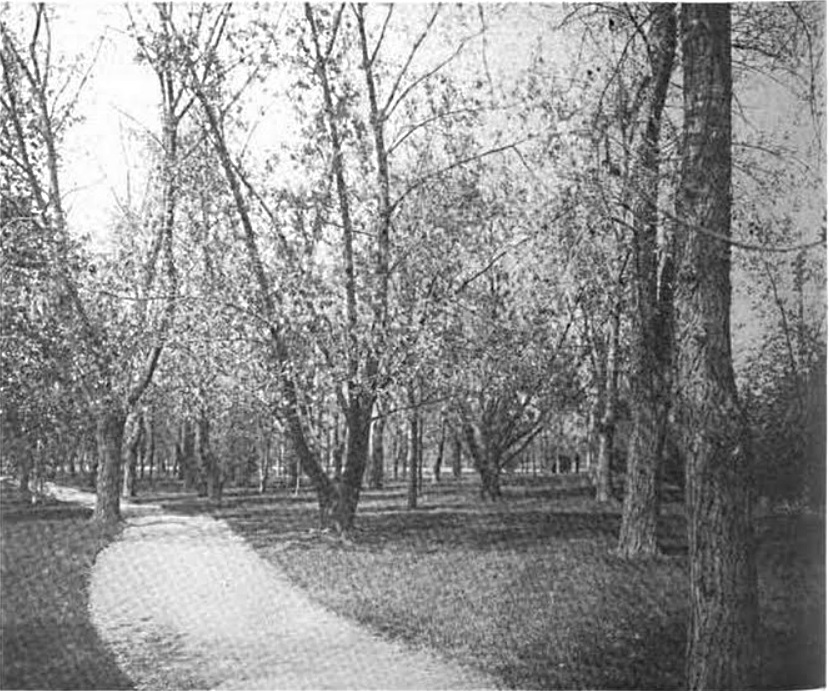
Gibson Park in 1920

Gibson Park was created in 1903 and named after the founder of Great Falls, Paris Gibson. The park was one of the first 3 parks in the city and was originally named Cascade Park but renamed later. Gibson and other future parks of Great Falls were inspired by Minneapolis's many parks as Paris Gibson lived there before settling in the city. In the first years of the park, the area did not contain typical attractions but instead contained wild animals such as deer, elk, and antelope. Such animals were kept in enclosures at the north end of the park. However, the animals soon became a problem, and in 1923, Great Falls Park Superintendent had a close call with a whitetail buck, which knocked him to the ground and kept attacking him. As a result, the deer were moved to the Highwood Mountains in 1932 with the elk following shortly after. Several years later in 1942, two gray squirrels were acquired from a Pennsylvanian dealer and were placed in a new enclosure. However, the squirrels escaped the enclosure, but were replaced by two more, and the attraction remained until the 1960s. In the 1970s and 1980s, swans were acquired but killed and replaced and killed again and were eventually removed. At the time, the park manager said "it's just not safe to keep swans here anymore". Afterwords, letters came in to protest the removal of the swans, but the swan's removal continued. Today, a duckpond remains, and swans, African geese, ducks, seagulls, Canadian geese and squirrels can be found in the park.

== Facilities ==
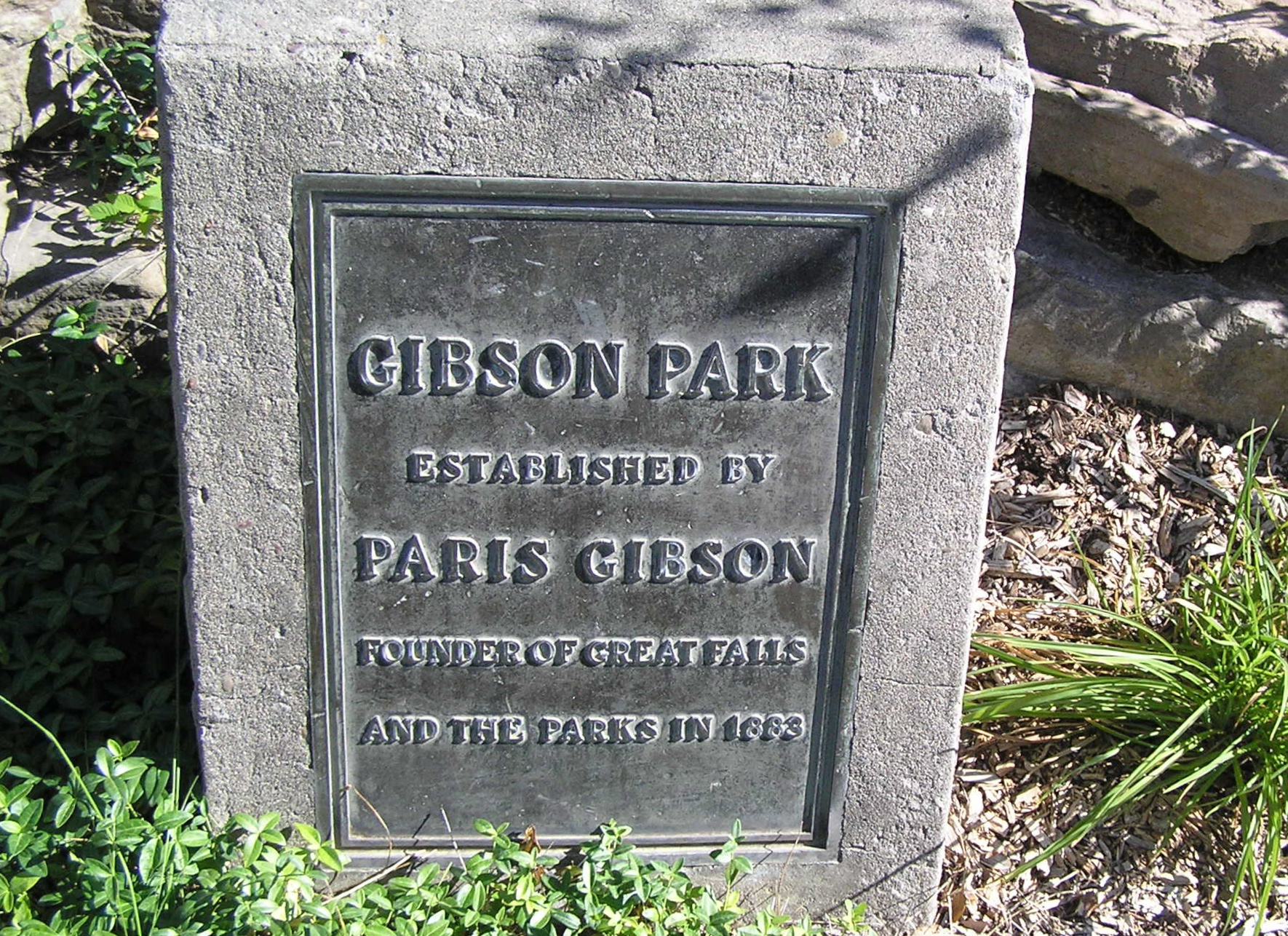
Gibson Park plaque

Gibson Park offers a bandshell, flower gardens, picnic areas, a historic cabin (Vinegar Jones Cabin) a walking trail, a rock archway, a duckpond, and easy access to downtown Great Falls and River's Edge Trail.

== Recreational activities ==
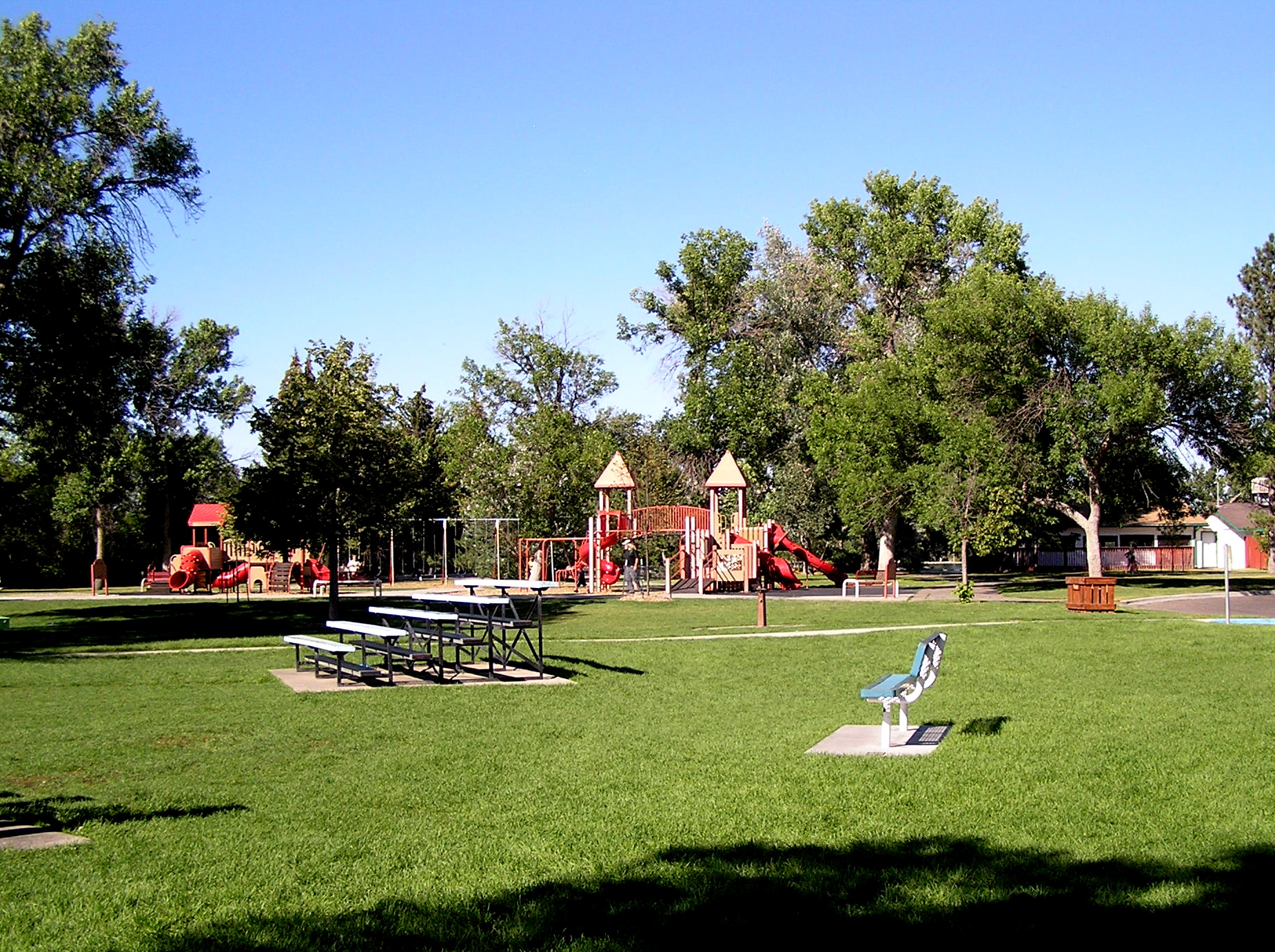
a playground set at Gibson Park

Gibson Park offers various recreational activities including walking, biking, animal sightseeing/feeding, rollerblading, biking, and other general trail and walking path activities.
