= Donald Wallace =

Donald Wallace may refer to:

- Donald Mackenzie Wallace (1841–1919), Scottish public servant, writer, editor and journalist
- Donald Smith Wallace (1844–1900), politician in Queensland, Australia
- Don Wallace (footballer) (1898–1968), Australian rules footballer
- Don Wallace (born 1940), American professional baseball player
