= Jack Wilshere =

English footballer and manager (born 1992)

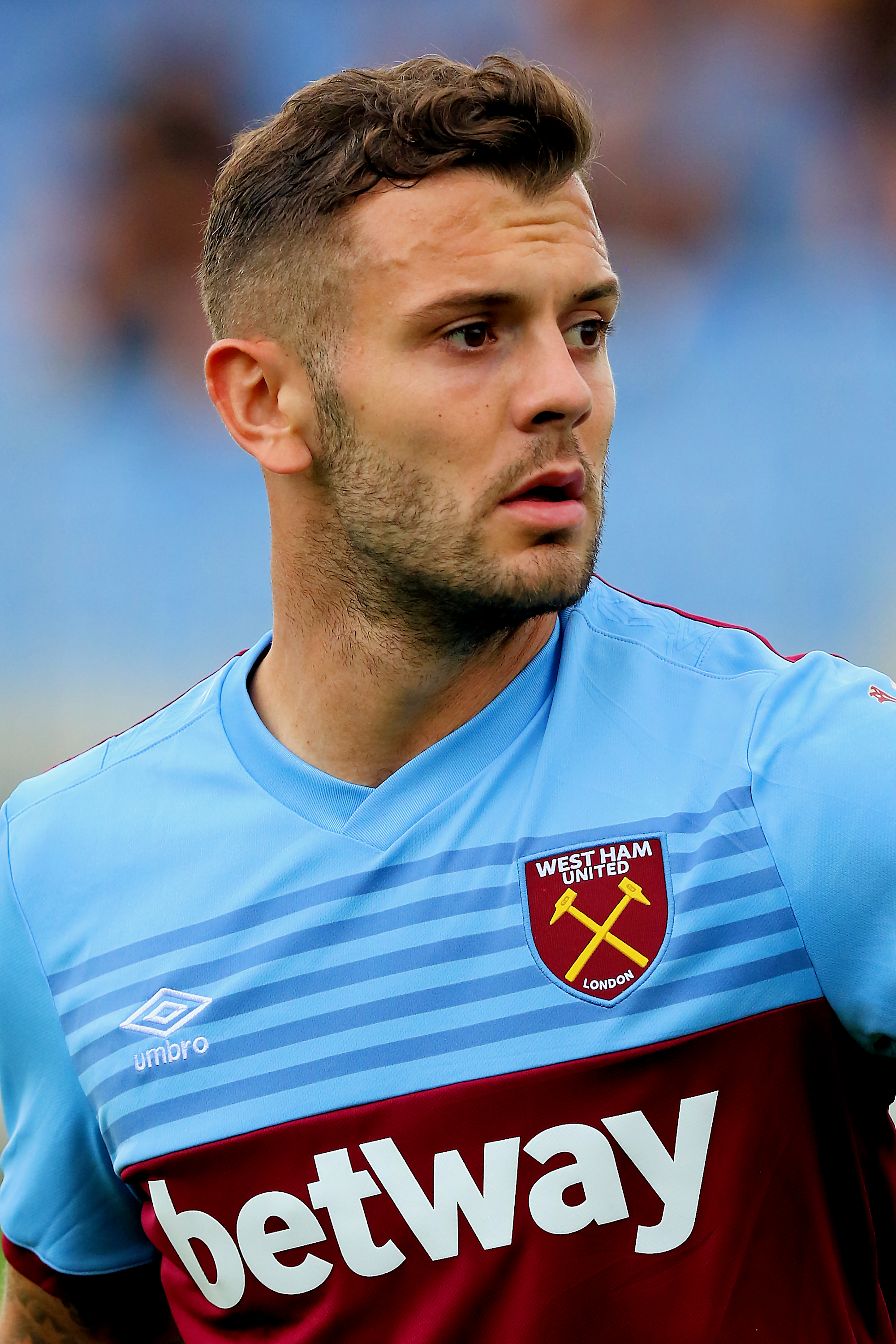
- Wilshere playing for West Ham United in 2019

Personal information
- Full name: Jack Andrew Garry Wilshere
- Date of birth: 1 January 1992 (age 34)
- Place of birth: Stevenage, England
- Height: 5 ft 8 in (1.72 m)
- Position: Midfielder

Team information
- Current team: Luton Town (manager)

Youth career
- 2001: Luton Town
- 2001–2008: Arsenal

Senior career*
Years	Team	Apps	(Gls)
2008–2018	Arsenal	125	(7)
2010	→ Bolton Wanderers (loan)	14	(1)
2016–2017	→ AFC Bournemouth (loan)	27	(0)
2018–2020	West Ham United	16	(0)
2021	AFC Bournemouth	14	(1)
2022	AGF	14	(0)
Total		210	(9)

International career
2006–2007	England U16	3	(0)
2007–2009	England U17	10	(1)
2009	England U19	1	(0)
2009–2010	England U21	7	(0)
2010–2016	England	34	(2)

Managerial career
- 2025: Norwich City (interim)
- 2025–: Luton Town
- * Club domestic league appearances and goals

Jack Andrew Garry Wilshere (born 1 January 1992) is an English professional football manager and former player who is currently manager of EFL League One club Luton Town.

As a midfielder, Wilshere came up through Arsenal's youth academy and made his first-team debut in 2008, becoming Arsenal's youngest league debutant at the age of 16 years, 256 days. He earned a number of accolades including the PFA Young Player of the Year award, selection to the 2010–11 PFA Team of the Year, and Arsenal's Player of the Season award. After leaving Arsenal in 2018, Wilshere joined West Ham United where he remained for two years before departing by mutual consent. He then had short spells at AFC Bournemouth and Danish club AGF, before announcing his retirement from playing in 2022.

Wilshere appeared 34 times for the England national team, having previously represented his country at youth levels. He made his debut for the senior team against Hungary at the age of 18 years and 222 days. He represented England at the 2014 FIFA World Cup and UEFA Euro 2016.

== Early life ==
Wilshere was born on 1 January 1992 in Stevenage, Hertfordshire. He grew up in nearby Hitchin, and captained his school team. He captained the Priory School football team to County Cup and District Cup glory from Year 7 through to Year 10, and also added the Under 15s National Cup to his list in Year 8. He was a boyhood fan of West Ham United, his idol being Paolo Di Canio.

== Club career ==
=== Arsenal ===
==== Early career ====
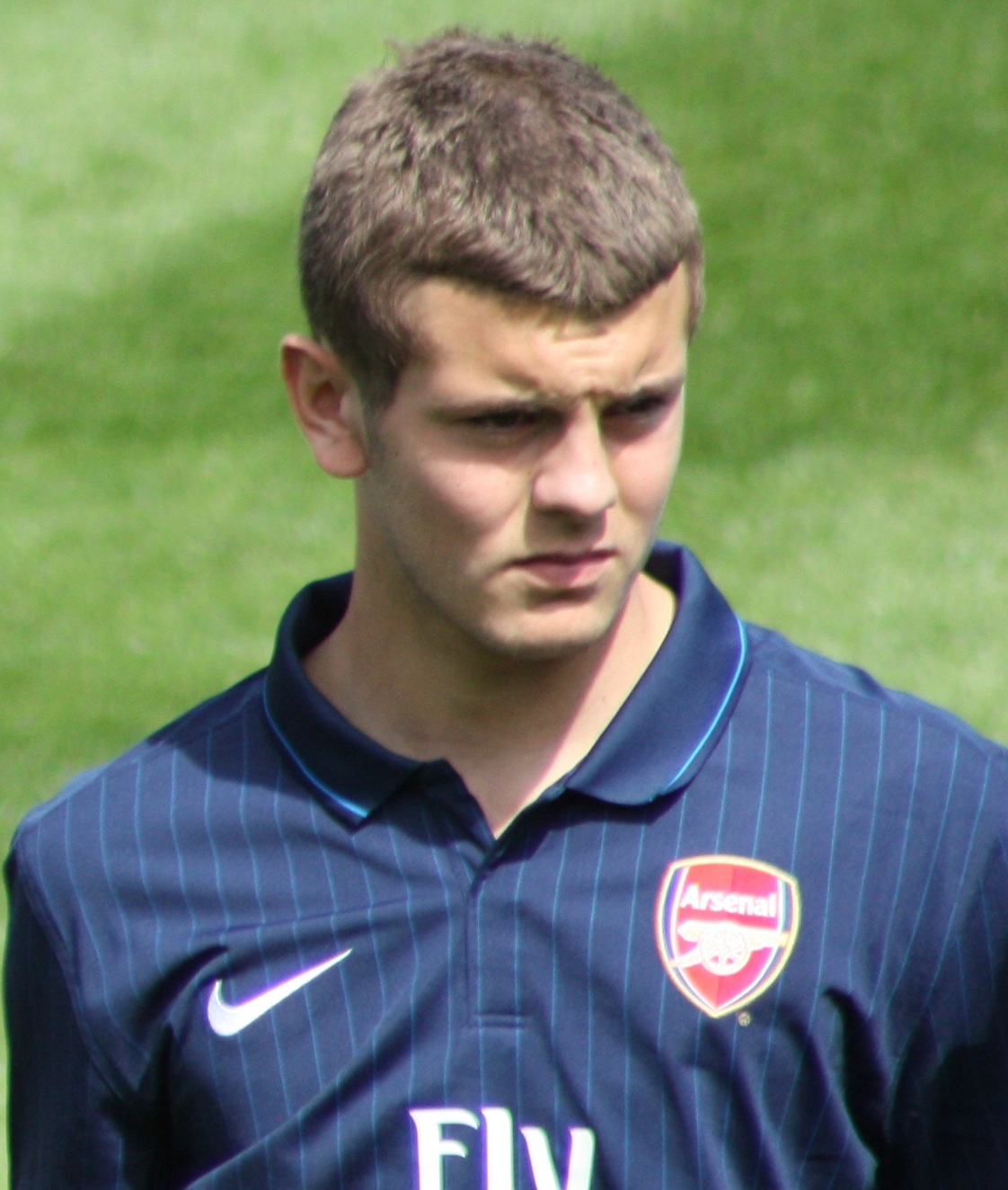
Wilshere playing for Arsenal in 2009

Wilshere joined the Arsenal Academy in October 2001 at the age of nine, after a short spell in the Luton Town youth programme. He rose through the ranks, and at the age of 15 was named the captain of the under-16s. In the summer of 2007, Wilshere featured in the Champions Youth Cup in Malaysia and upon his return to England, Arsenal Academy coach Steve Bould gave him a start for the under-18s first match against the Chelsea under-18 team. He scored his first goal against Aston Villa under-18s in a 4–1 win. He then scored a hat-trick against Watford under-18s, helping his side to an Academy Group A title. He finished his first full season with the under-18s with 13 goals in 18 appearances, most of which came when he was 15.

In February 2008, he made his debut for Arsenal Reserves aged 16 against Reading, and scored Arsenal's only goal of the match, which ended in a draw. He scored a memorable goal against West Ham reserves in March, picking the ball up and curling a shot into the top left corner under the watching eye of first-team manager Arsène Wenger. He managed to record two goals and two assists in just three appearances for the reserves at the end of the 2007–08 season. He played in the under-16s' victory in the Ferroli Cup, being named as player of the tournament. He played an important role in Arsenal's 2008–09 FA Youth Cup win, scoring goals in the semi-final and producing a man-of-the-match display in the first leg of the final against Liverpool, assisting two goals and scoring himself.

Wenger gave Wilshere a place in Arsenal's first-team squad for the 2008–09 season, and he was given the number 19 shirt. He made his competitive debut in a Premier League match against Blackburn Rovers at Ewood Park in September 2008, as an 84th-minute substitute for Robin van Persie. At the age of 16 years and 256 days he was Arsenal's youngest-ever league debutant, a record previously held by Cesc Fàbregas. Ten days later, on 23 September, Wilshere scored his first competitive Arsenal goal in a 6–0 victory against Sheffield United in the 2008–09 League Cup. On 25 November 2008, Wilshere came on as a substitute in a UEFA Champions League match against Dynamo Kyiv, becoming the fifth sixteen-year-old to ever play in the competition. In January 2009, he signed his first professional contract, extending it in July the same year.

In the preparation for the 2009–10 season, Wilshere scored twice and was twice awarded man of the match as Arsenal regained the friendly tournament, the Emirates Cup. On 22 September 2009, he started for Arsenal in their 2–0 League Cup win over West Bromwich Albion. In the 37th minute of the match he was involved in a controversial incident with Jerome Thomas; Thomas pushed Wilshere's face and was shown a red card.

==== Loan to Bolton Wanderers ====
On 29 January 2010, Wilshere joined Premier League side Bolton Wanderers on loan until the end of the 2009–10 season. He made his first league start in the away match at Manchester City on 9 February, and scored his first Bolton goal, his first in the Premier League, on 6 March 2010 in the 2–1 victory at West Ham United. He impressed at Bolton, and that club attempted, unsuccessfully, to sign him on loan for another season.

==== 2010–2013 ====
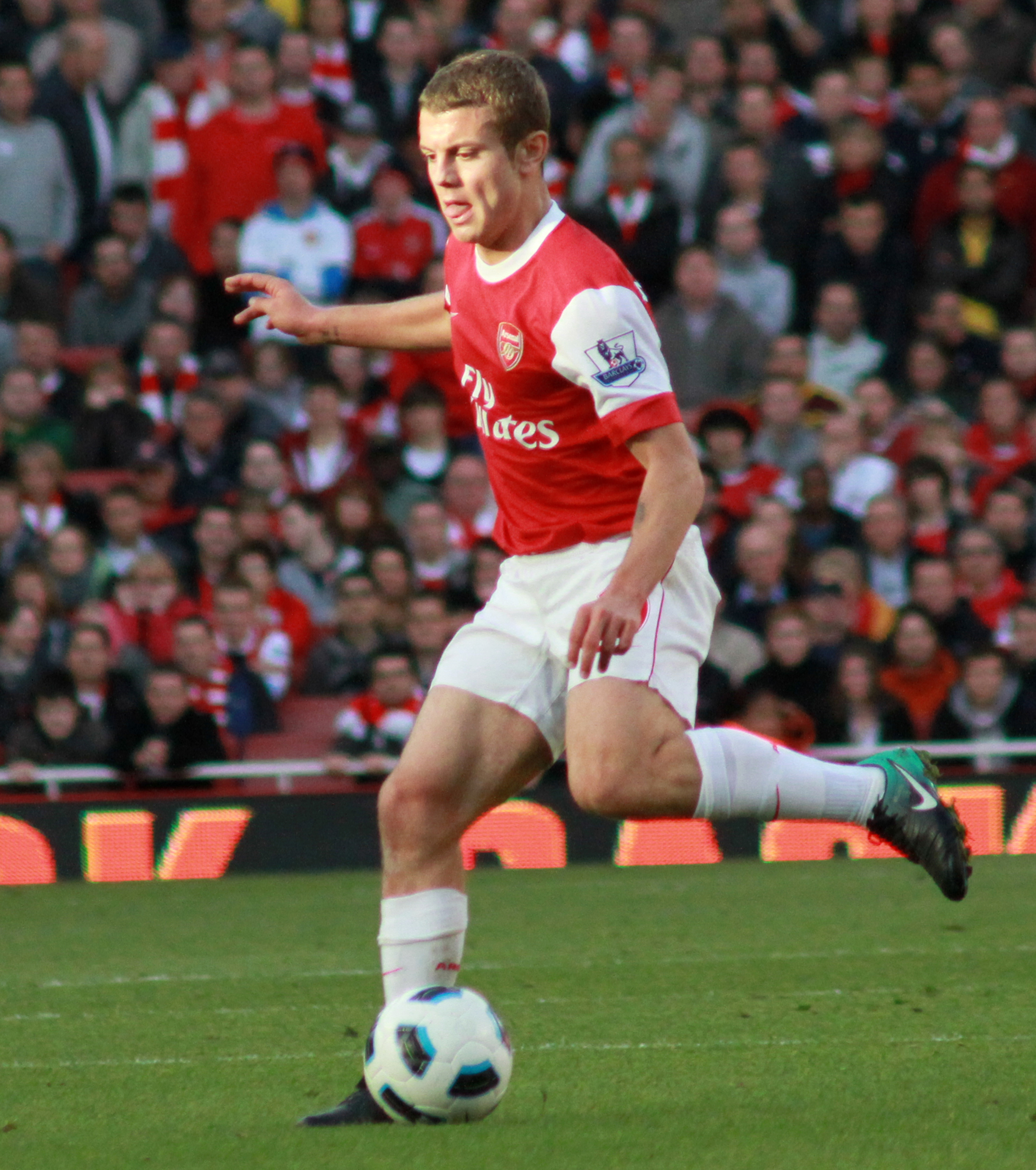
Wilshere playing for Arsenal in 2010

Wilshere featured in Arsenal's first three matches of the 2010–11 Premier League, starting in the 1–1 draw against Liverpool, the 6–0 win over Blackpool, before coming on as a substitute against Blackburn Rovers. Wilshere continued his fine form through to October, before his month was cut short with a red card in a 2–1 win against Birmingham City on 16 October. He was given his marching orders deep into injury time for a tackle on Nikola Žigić and missed the rest of the domestic month. However, Wilshere participated in European competition against Shakhtar Donetsk scored the Gunners' fourth goal on the night in a 5–1 win.

Wilshere was again a regular feature alongside Alex Song at the heart of the Arsenal midfield during the following months. The role meant he had the responsibility of protecting the Arsenal back four against Chelsea. Against the likes of Michael Essien and Mikel John Obi, the 18-year-old was praised for showing great physical strength during the match which Arsenal won 3–1. He made seven appearances during the month of January as he continued his partnership with Alex Song at the centre of Arsenal's midfield. This connection was as such displayed in that of the crunch match against Manchester United which was won 1–0. England manager Fabio Capello described him as "the future" and declared his intention to give him the 'holding role' for England after he watched the 19-year-old hold down a midfield place for Arsenal during the course of the season. Wilshere finished the season competing in all of Arsenal's final fixtures during May, making 49 appearances in all competitions for Arsenal.

During the summer leading into the 2011–12 season, Wilshere suffered a stress fracture ankle injury during a 2011 Emirates Cup pre-season friendly against the New York Red Bulls, and during the first few months of the injury, Arsène Wenger said: "The news we have for Jack is very positive", he had said. "No [he will not be back sooner], we will respect the delays. I count maybe mid-February for Jack." Upon having successful ankle surgery, Wilshere's participation for Arsenal was minimum. Wenger further commented on his injury saying: "The first news we have had is better than expected", said Wenger. "He is not in a boot, but I don't know more. His morale looks quite good and I hope it will only be a short setback."

During further rehabilitation, it looked as if Wilshere would heal, with Wenger saying: "It is difficult to set a deadline on Jack", he said. "We go week by week with him. But his last scan was very good so we don't have worry anymore. It is about progress and fitness, however, I can't set a date." However, Wilshere was ruled out of the remainder of the 2011–12 season. The injury meant that he did not participate in a single club match all season, as well as the 2012 Summer Olympics and England's UEFA Euro 2012 campaign, with Wenger ruling him out further saying: "His ankle is fine and he makes progress, but it is slow progress, [and] we had a chat about that. His progress is not quick enough to go to the Euros."

Wilshere continued his recovery from his ankle injury, which had ruled him out for the whole of the previous season. "We still have to assess them [him and Bacary Sagna] again after the international break", said Arsène Wenger. "After that they should not be too far away from normal training." He made his return to the first team, making his first Premier League start in 17 months (524 days), playing in the win over Queens Park Rangers. The 20-year-old made an immediate impact, producing a typically combative performance that saw him name man of the match. "It felt amazing to be back", Wilshere said. "All the hard work and long days at the training ground have paid off."

He continued to feature for Arsenal, and made six appearances in December, producing another man of the match performance against that of West Bromwich Albion. The young midfielder committed his long-term future to the club after signing a new contract, to the delight of Arsène Wenger, who said: "Jack is certainly the best known, the leader of this group [of young British players]. We're very happy that we could conclude their new deals at the same time."

Wilshere continued to produce excellent displays in the opening month of 2013, playing a part in all eight of Arsenal's matches and scoring the winner against Swansea City in the FA Cup. His all-action performance against the Welsh side saw him win another man of the match award in that match. Meanwhile, Wilshere was given the captain's armband when regular skipper Thomas Vermaelen went off injured against West Ham. "[Wilshere] is naturally a guy who is not scared of anything on the football pitch and that is usually the sign of a leader", Wenger said. "He wants to win and shows you that. Of course he will be one of the leaders of this club – in fact he already is. A leader is somebody who does everything on the pitch to help his team to win. And he does that." He played the entirety of the North London derby against Tottenham Hotspur before picking up an injury that ruled him out of the month's remaining matches.

He was used as a substitute in all three of Arsenal's matches in May, making late appearances against QPR, Wigan Athletic and Newcastle United. "Jack will have a small, mild surgery [at the end of the season]", explained Arsène Wenger before the Wigan game. "It is a very small, small, small one. It is to remove a small pin. It will not be a problem. He will need very minor surgery, but we manage that as far as we can until the end of the season. At the moment, we use him only in games when I feel he is really needed."

==== 2013–2016 ====
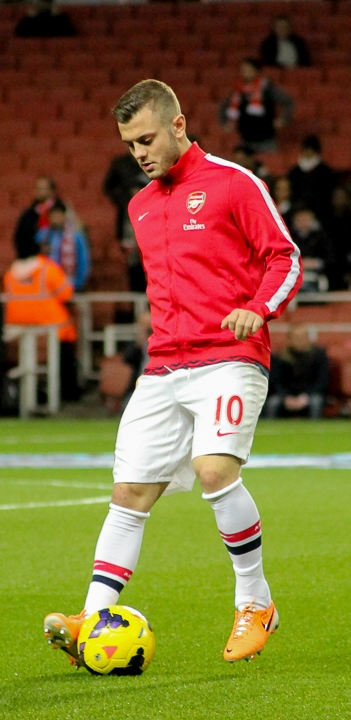
Wilshere warming up for Arsenal in 2014

Wilshere started the season playing on the left wing due to injuries keeping out Arsenal's first-team wingers such as Lukas Podolski, Alex Oxlade-Chamberlain and Theo Walcott. He scored his first goal of the season on 6 October in a 1–1 draw away to West Bromwich Albion. He scored his second goal of the season on 19 October in a 4–1 home win against Norwich City. And, on 26 November, he scored his first career brace in a 2–0 win against Marseille in the UEFA Champions League, the first being the fastest European goal scored by an English player in Europe's top-tier competition, which was timed at 29 seconds. During a match against Manchester City on 14 December, Wilshere gave an abusive hand gesture and was given a two-match ban.

On 13 January 2014, Wilshere played a part in both of Arsenal's goals against Aston Villa in a match which Arsenal won 2–1. Having scored in the 34th minute, Wilshere won the ball back from the kick-off and set up Olivier Giroud, who scored Arsenal's second. Wilshere picked up his fourth assist of the season in Arsenal's 2–0 win over Fulham, on 18 January, setting up Santi Cazorla close to the hour mark. Wilshere featured for England's friendly against Denmark on 6 March. However, following a tackle from Daniel Agger, Wilshere was ruled out for just over six weeks after suffering a hairline fracture on his left foot, subsequently missing key Arsenal fixtures against Chelsea and Manchester City, along with the FA Cup semi-final against Wigan on 12 April. On 17 May, Wilshere came on as an extra-time substitute in the 2014 FA Cup final as Arsenal beat Hull City 3–2 at Wembley Stadium for their first silverware since 2005. On 28 May, Wilshere's goal against Norwich was voted BBC Goal of the Season, accumulating 42% of the votes.

On 10 August, Wilshere started as Arsenal won the 2014 FA Community Shield by beating Manchester City 3–0. He scored and assisted in Arsenal's 2–2 home draw against the same team on 13 September. On 27 November, Wilshere was ruled out for three months following surgery on his left ankle after injuring the ligaments in a 1–2 home defeat to Manchester United. On 24 May 2015, Wilshere struck from outside the area as Arsenal beat West Brom 4–1 to clinch a spot in the group stages of next season's UEFA Champions League. The goal would later be voted the BBC Goal of the Season, making Wilshere the first player to win that award in consecutive seasons since the start of the Premier League. On 30 May, Wilshere came on as a substitute in the 2015 FA Cup final, a 4–0 win over Aston Villa at Wembley Stadium. On Arsenal's victory parade after winning the final, he led fans in a chant calling local rivals Tottenham "shit". Having previously been warned by the FA after a similar chant in the previous season's campaign, he was charged with misconduct.

Wilshere broke his fibula during pre-season training in August, and was initially expected to be out for up to a few weeks. However, in September, he underwent surgery on his leg and was ruled out of action for a further 3 months. In February 2016, Wilshere stated that he was working to regain fitness, albeit slowly. He admitted to being frustrated by his injuries, but that he was still motivated to return to the pitch. On 8 April 2016, Wilshere returned to the pitch after about 10 months as he started for the U-21 side against Newcastle United and scored his first goal after coming back from injury against West Brom U-21 about two weeks later. On 24 April Wilshere returned to the Arsenal line up against Sunderland and returned to pitch on the 84th minute replacing Mesut Özil.

==== Loan to Bournemouth ====
On 31 August 2016, Wilshere completed a season-long loan move to AFC Bournemouth for the 2016–17 season and was given the number 32, previously worn by midfielder Eunan O'Kane. On 10 September 2016, Wilshere played his first match for Bournemouth, as a 63rd-minute substitute against West Bromwich Albion; his team won 1–0. Wilshere then won consecutive Player of the Month awards for Bournemouth for November and December 2016. On 15 April 2017, Wilshere suffered a hairline fracture to his left fibula after his clash with Harry Kane in a match against Tottenham at White Hart Lane. On 19 April 2017, it was confirmed that Wilshere would miss the rest of the season after making 29 Premier League appearances for Bournemouth and would be treated back at Arsenal.

==== 2017–2018: Final year at Arsenal ====
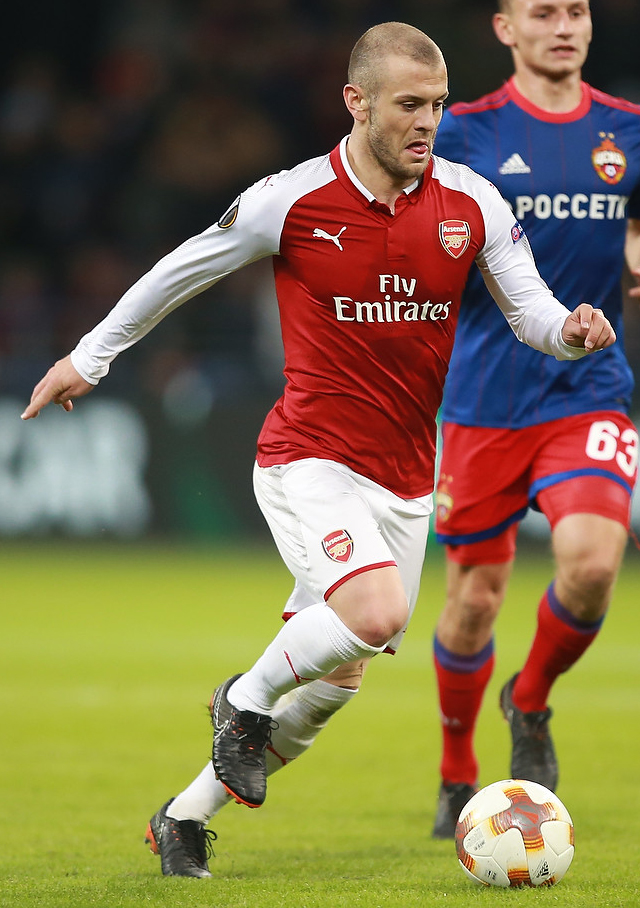
Wilshere playing for Arsenal in 2018

During the summer leading into the 2017–18 season, various clubs showed interest in signing the midfielder, but by mid-August, Wenger confirmed that he had plans for him that season. On 15 September, he made his first appearance for Arsenal since August 2016 as a substitute in the second half against FC Köln in the Europa League. On 20 September, Wilshere made his first start in over 16 months against Doncaster Rovers and played for the full 90 minutes.

On 22 October, he played his first Premier League match of the season as a substitute in a 5–2 win over Everton at Goodison Park, assisting a goal for Aaron Ramsey. On 7 December, Wilshere scored his first Arsenal goal in 928 days as the Gunners defeated BATE Borisov 6–0 in the Europa League. Wilshere's performances in the Europa League group stage and an injury to Ramsey saw him start in the Premier League for Arsenal for the first time since May 2016 in the team's 0–0 draw with West Ham United on 13 December 2017. It was also the first time he had completed the full 90 minutes in the Premier League for the club since September 2014. On 3 January 2018, in his sixth consecutive Premier League start, Wilshere scored his first Premier League goal for two and a half years in a 2–2 home draw with London rivals Chelsea.

On 19 June 2018, Wilshere announced that he would be leaving Arsenal, with his contract due to expire at the end of the month.

=== West Ham United ===
Wilshere signed for Premier League club West Ham United on 9 July 2018 on a three-year contract. He made his debut on 12 August in a 4–0 defeat to Liverpool. On 27 August 2019, Wilshere scored his first and only goal for the club in a 2–0 win over Newport County in the 2018–19 EFL Cup. His contract was mutually terminated on 5 October 2020 with one year remaining, after spending two years at the club. In just over two years, Wilshere made only 19 appearances for West Ham, including 16 in the Premier League. For much of his time with the club he was injured but, according to the player himself, often he was fit but was not picked to play. On his release, Wilshere said that he believed he could still play at the top level of English football.

=== Bournemouth ===
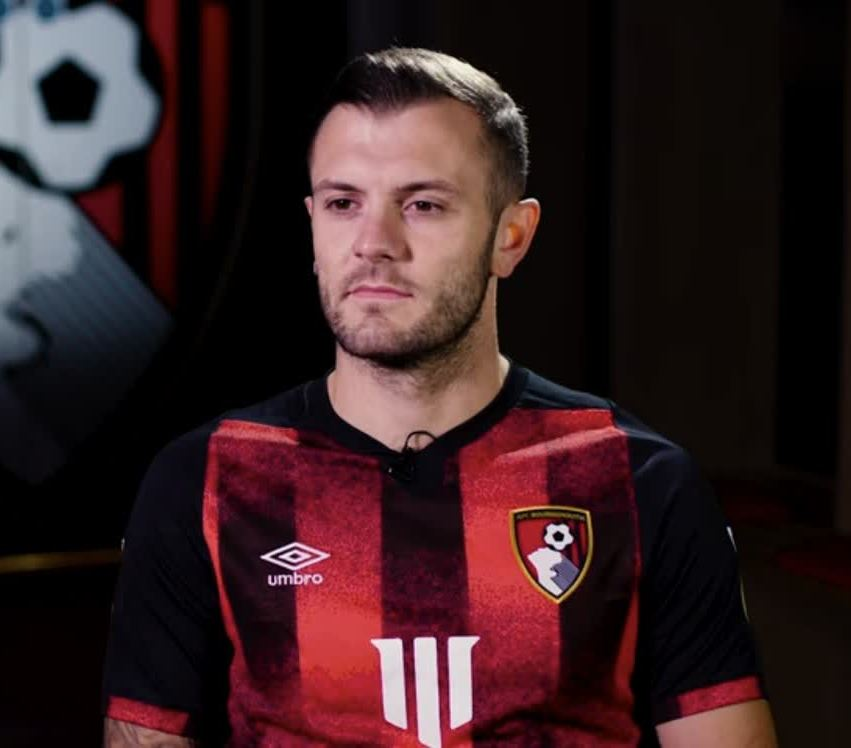
Wilshere with AFC Bournemouth in 2021

On 18 January 2021, Wilshere returned to Bournemouth on a short-term contract. The move came as a result of him training with the then Championship side since December 2020. On 26 January, he scored in a 2–1 win over Crawley Town in the FA Cup, his first goal in any competition since 27 August 2019. On 6 February, he scored his first league goal for AFC Bournemouth in a 3–2 victory over Birmingham City. He was released by Bournemouth at the end of the season, having made 17 appearances and scored two goals in all competitions during his short-lived return to the club.

=== AGF ===
On 20 February 2022, Wilshere signed for Danish Superliga club AGF on an initial short-term contract until the end of the 2021–22 season. Having been without a club since his departure from Bournemouth, Wilshere had been training with former club Arsenal since October 2021, having also trained with Serie B club Como previously. AGF announced on 6 July that the club would not renew Wilshere's contract for the 2022–23 season. Wilshere announced his retirement from football on 8 July, aged 30.

== International career ==
=== Youth ===
Since 2006, the England national youth teams played Wilshere in an age group above his age. Wilshere was just 14 when he played for the England national under-16 team at the 2006 Victory Shield. At the age of 15, he began playing for the England national under-17 team. He was then named in the squad for the 2009 UEFA European Under-17 Championship in May, starting the first two matches, particularly impressing in the second match against Germany before going off with an injury which kept him out of the final match. After the tournament, he was named among the 10 future stars from the tournament.

On 11 September 2009, he also came on as substitute for his England under-21 debut against the Netherlands in a 0–0 draw.

=== Senior ===
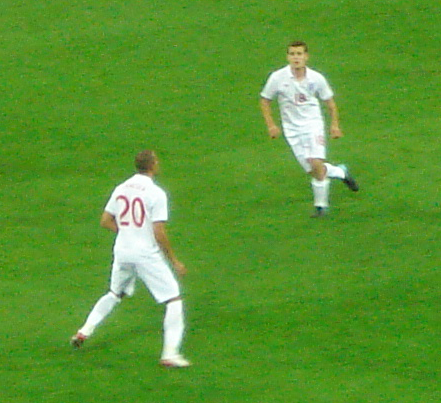
Wilshere (right) making his England debut against Hungary in 2010

On 7 August 2010, Wilshere was called up to the England senior team for the first time for their friendly against Hungary. He made his England debut in the match played on 11 August 2010, coming on as an 83rd-minute substitute for Steven Gerrard. This made him the 10th-youngest player ever to play for England, at the age of 18 years and 222 days.

On 9 February 2011, Wilshere made his full England debut when he started in a friendly against Denmark. He impressed despite playing in an unfamiliar role just in front of the defence, and was praised by manager Fabio Capello. On 25 March 2011, Wilshere made his competitive debut for England in a UEFA Euro 2012 qualifier against Wales at Cardiff's Millennium Stadium. He made one further appearance in the qualifying phase but missed the tournament finals due to injury.

On 6 February 2013, Wilshere made his first start for England since 2011, having recovered from injury, and was named man-of-the-match as England beat Brazil 2–1 at Wembley Stadium. Wilshere's performance was widely praised, including by manager Roy Hodgson, captain Steven Gerrard, Wayne Rooney and Frank Lampard. He was part of England's squad for the 2014 FIFA World Cup, coming on as a 73rd-minute substitute in England's opening Group D match against Italy. He started the final group match against Costa Rica, with England already eliminated from the competition.

Wilshere was awarded man of the match in six out of seven UEFA Euro 2016 qualifying matches. His first England goals came on his 28th appearance on 14 June 2015, in a UEFA Euro 2016 qualifying match away to Slovenia, netting two long-range strikes as they came from behind to win 3–2 at the Stožice Stadium in Ljubljana.

Wilshere was selected for the 2018 friendlies in preparation for the 2018 FIFA World Cup in Russia. On 16 May 2018, he was left out of Gareth Southgate's squad for the tournament.

== Coaching and managerial career ==
=== Arsenal U18s ===
On 11 July 2022, four days after announcing his retirement from playing, Wilshere was announced as the new head coach of the Arsenal under-18 team. He led the team to the final of the 2022–23 FA Youth Cup in his first season in charge, in which they lost to the West Ham.

=== Norwich City ===
On 23 October 2024, Wilshere left Arsenal to join EFL Championship club Norwich City as a first team coach, working under head coach Johannes Hoff Thorup. On 22 April 2025, Wilshere was named interim manager of the club, after Thorup was dismissed and his assistant Glen Riddersholm also left the club.

=== Luton Town ===
On 13 October 2025, Wilshere was appointed manager of EFL League One club Luton Town. He achieved his first title as manager by winning the EFL Trophy, securing a 3–1 victory over Stockport County in the final.

== Style of play ==
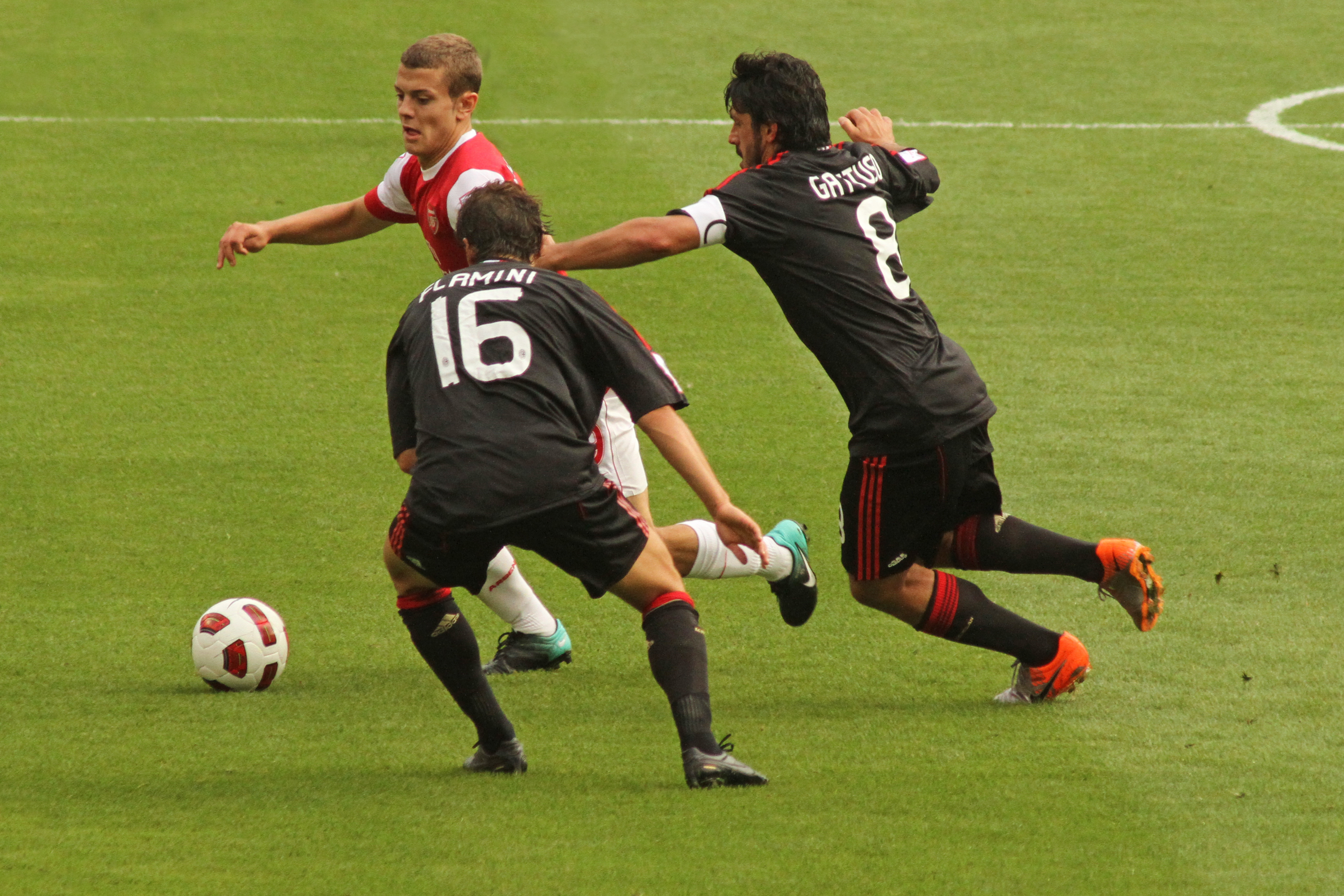
Wilshere (in red) battles with Gennaro Gattuso during Arsenal's match against AC Milan in 2010

As a player, Wilshere was known for his movement, vision, passing and combination play, as well as his leadership on the pitch. He was described by Arsène Wenger as having "Spanish technique, but an English heart." Owen Coyle, the manager of Bolton during Wilshere's loan spell at the club, praised his ability to "tackle and take a knock", despite his lack of height. However, Arsenal head of youth development Liam Brady said that Wilshere had problems with his temper early on in his career.

Wilshere played in many different positions, including as an attacking midfielder, a winger, and as a deep-lying central midfielder. Wilshere's style of play was frequently compared to that of former Arsenal midfielder Liam Brady, while Brady himself identified Wilshere as the latest in a line of technically gifted English players from Glenn Hoddle to Wayne Rooney.

Following his return from injury in the 2012–13 season, Wilshere received praise for his performances and potential from a number of respected players: Barcelona and Brazil defender Dani Alves referred to Wilshere as "a great player", and compared his potential to that of Barcelona legends Andrés Iniesta and Xavi. Former Manchester United and Germany midfielder Bastian Schweinsteiger called Wilshere "one of the best players there are" at his position; and Borussia Dortmund and Germany forward Marco Reus hailed him as "a perfect player". Despite his talent, he often struggled with injuries throughout his career, which is thought by pundits to have limited his potential.

== Personal life ==
Wilshere was arrested in the early hours of the morning on 29 August 2010 in connection with a "fracas". However, it appeared Wilshere played the role of peacemaker, and so did not face charges but received a caution.

On 26 September 2013, Wilshere's partner, Lauren Neal, gave birth to their second child. Wilshere and Neal separated in 2014, and in 2017 he married Andriani Michael.

== Career statistics ==
=== Club ===
Appearances and goals by club, season and competition
Club	Season	League			National cup (Note: Includes FA Cup)		League cup (Note: Includes Football League/EFL Cup)		Europe		Other		Total	
Club	Season	Division	Apps	Goals	Apps	Goals	Apps	Goals	Apps	Goals	Apps	Goals	Apps	Goals
Arsenal	2008–09	Premier League	1	0	2	0	3	1	2 (Note: Appearances in UEFA Champions League)	0	—		8	1
Arsenal	2009–10	Premier League	1	0	1	0	2	0	3	0	—		7	0
Arsenal	2010–11	Premier League	35	1	2	0	5	0	7	1	—		49	2
Arsenal	2011–12	Premier League	0	0	0	0	0	0	0	0	—		0	0
Arsenal	2012–13	Premier League	25	0	4	1	1	0	3	1	—		33	2
Arsenal	2013–14	Premier League	24	3	3	0	1	0	7	2	—		35	5
Arsenal	2014–15	Premier League	14	2	1	0	1	0	5	0	1 (Note: Appearance in FA Community Shield)	0	22	2
Arsenal	2015–16	Premier League	3	0	0	0	0	0	0	0	0	0	3	0
Arsenal	2016–17	Premier League	2	0	—		—		—		—		2	0
Arsenal	2017–18	Premier League	20	1	0	0	5	0	13 (Note: Appearances in UEFA Europa League)	1	0	0	38	2
Arsenal	Total		125	7	13	1	18	1	40	5	1	0	197	14
Bolton Wanderers (loan)	2009–10	Premier League	14	1	—		—		—		—		14	1
AFC Bournemouth (loan)	2016–17	Premier League	27	0	0	0	0	0	—		—		27	0
West Ham United	2018–19	Premier League	8	0	0	0	0	0	—		—		8	0
West Ham United	2019–20	Premier League	8	0	0	0	2	1	—		—		10	1
West Ham United	2020–21	Premier League	0	0	0	0	1	0	—		—		1	0
West Ham United	Total		16	0	0	0	3	1	0	0	0	0	19	1
AFC Bournemouth	2020–21	Championship	14	1	2	1	—		—		1 (Note: Appearance in Championship play-offs)	0	17	2
AGF	2021–22	Danish Superliga	14	0	—		—		—		—		14	0
Career total			210	9	15	2	21	2	40	5	2	0	288	18

=== International ===
Appearances and goals by national team and year
National team	Year	Apps	Goals
England	2010	1	0
England	2011	4	0
England	2012	1	0
England	2013	8	0
England	2014	12	0
England	2015	2	2
England	2016	6	0
Total		34	2

England score listed first, score column indicates score after each Wilshere goal

List of international goals scored by Jack Wilshere
No.	Date	Venue	Cap	Opponent	Score	Result	Competition	Ref.
1	14 June 2015	Stožice Stadium, Ljubljana, Slovenia	28	Slovenia	1–1	3–2	UEFA Euro 2016 qualifying	
2	14 June 2015	Stožice Stadium, Ljubljana, Slovenia	28	Slovenia	2–1	3–2	UEFA Euro 2016 qualifying	

== Managerial statistics ==
As of match played 21 November 2026

Managerial record by team and tenure
Team	From	To	Record					Ref.
Team	From	To	P	W	D	L	Win %	Ref.
Norwich City (interim)	22 April 2025	4 May 2025	2	1	1	0	50.0	
Luton Town	13 October 2025	Present	64	34	15	15	53.1	
Total			66	35	16	15	53.0	

== Honours ==
=== Player ===
Arsenal U18

- FA Youth Cup: 2008–09

Arsenal

- FA Cup: 2013–14, 2014–15
- FA Community Shield: 2014
- Football League/EFL Cup runner-up: 2010–11, 2017–18

Individual

- BBC Goal of the Season: 2013–14, 2014–15
- PFA Young Player of the Year: 2010–11
- PFA Team of the Year: 2010–11 Premier League
- Arsenal Player of the Season: 2010–11

=== Manager ===
Arsenal U18

- FA Youth Cup runner-up: 2022–23

Luton Town

- EFL Trophy: 2025–26
