= 2006 Victory Shield =

The Victory Shield 2006 was the 61st edition of the Victory Shield, an annual football tournament competed for by the Under 16 level teams of England, Scotland, Northern Ireland and Wales. It was held from 13 October to 8 December 2006 and was won by England.

== Venues ==
Country	Stadium	Capacity
England	Glanford Park	9,088
Northern Ireland	Ballymena Showgrounds	5,200
Northern Ireland	Mourneview Park	5,000
Scotland	Almondvale Stadium	10,016
Scotland	Firhill Stadium	10,887
Wales	Richmond Park	3,000

== Final table ==
Teams	GP	W	D	L	GF	GA	GD	Pts
England	3	2	1	0	6	2	+4	7
Scotland	3	2	0	1	5	3	+2	6
Wales	3	1	1	1	4	3	+1	4
Northern Ireland	3	0	0	3	0	9	−9	0

== Results ==
October 13, 2006

Scotland	3–0	Northern Ireland
Archie Campbell; John Fleck; Steven Wallace (OG)

Firhill Stadium, Glasgow
Attendance: 557

October 20, 2006

Wales	1–1	England
Leigh Smith		James Owen (OG)

Richmond Park, Carmarthen

November 3, 2006

Scotland	2–0	Wales
Danny Thomson; Archie Campbell

Almondvale Stadium, Livingston
Attendance: 1,306

November 9, 2006

Northern Ireland	0–3	England
		Conor McLaughlin (OG); Nathan Delfouneso; Sanchez Watt

Ballymena Showgrounds, Ballymena

November 24, 2006

Northern Ireland	0–3	Wales
		James Owen; Graeme Taylor (OG); Nathan Hughes

Mourneview Park, Lurgan

December 8, 2006

England	2–1	Scotland
Nicky Ajose; Nathan Delfouneso		Robert McHugh

Glanford Park, Scunthorpe
Attendance: 2,282

The game was scheduled to take place at Bootham Crescent in York, but due a waterlogged pitch it game was played at Glanford Park.

== Result ==
2006 Victory Shield winners

England
