= Arch Creek =

Arch Creek may refer to:

- Arch Creek, Florida, an early settlement in Florida, US
- Arch Creek (Montana), a creek in Montana, US
- Arch Creek Petroglyphs, Native American rock art in Wyoming, US
