= Archway =

Archway may refer to:

- Archway, London, an area of London, England
  - Archway tube station
    - Vantage Point (London), formerly Archway Tower
  - Archway Road, a major road in London
- Archway Cookies, an American cookie manufacturer
- Archway Academy, in Houston, Texas, United States
- Archway School, in Gloucestershire, England
- The Archway, a newspaper at Bryant University, Rhode Island, United States
- Archway (card game)
- Operation Archway, a military operation in the Second World War

== See also ==
- Arch (disambiguation)
- Arches (disambiguation)
- Thames Archway Company, an 1805 company formed to build a tunnel under the River Thames
- Great Platte River Road Archway Monument, in Nebraska, United States
