= Vinegar Jones Cabin =

Historic cabin in Great Falls, Montana, US

Vingear Jones Cabin
- Interactive map of Vingear Jones Cabin
- 47.30354°N 111.18205°E

History
- Built: Spring 1884
- Built for: W. G. Jones

Site notes
- Owner: Great Falls Park System

Vinegar Jones Cabin is a historical site in the city of Great Falls, Montana. The cabin is located at Gibson Park and is believed to be the first permanent home in the Great Falls townsite.

== History ==
=== The Cabin's History ===
The Vinegar Jones Cabin was originally located on the south side of the original Great Falls townsite and was built by Fort Benton carpenter Josiah Peeper in the spring of 1884. Afterwords in 1890, W. G. Jones purchased a lot near Fifth Avenue South and moved the cabin there. The cabin, the Jones family, and the cabin remained in the same lot, with an addition of a two-story frame house. However, the family decided to live in the house instead of the cabin, but both buildings remained and were protected until Vinegar's and his wife, Rosa's death in the 1930s. Until 2001, the cabin stayed at its current place, and survived fires and proposed demolition permits. However, in 2001, Mark Blom and Dale Nelson acquired the cabin. Later that year, Mark approached the city, offering the cabin to them, and the city approved the plan. In December 2002, the cabin was brought to its current site, Gibson Park.

=== Vinegar Jones History ===
W. G. Jones, more commonly referred to as Vinegar Jones, was born in 1859 in Brewer, Maine. He was given Whitman as his first name named after a pioneer missionary Marcus Whitman that his mom was friends with. He was given Gibson as his middle name for his mother's maiden name. As he grew up, he came to the Upper Missouri River via the steamboat Helena in August 1880 to assist in the building of the Army's new post, Fort Assiniboine. In the fall of 1880, W. G. Jones took a wagon to Fort Benton, and began his middle life by marrying his wife Rosa and furnishing much of the wood that is in the Grand Union Hotel. A few years later in the fall of 1884, Jones began work in the new Great Falls townsite by helping build several buildings such as the townsite's first store, flour mill, office, and several more. In 1890, he bought Josiah Peeper's cabin, moved it to a site across from Fifth Avenue South, and kept it preserved until he died in 1931.

== Footnotes ==
- The cabin is not on the National Register of Historic Places
