= Harold McDonald (footballer, born 1922) =

Australian rules footballer (1922–1999)

Harold Keith McDonald

Personal information
- Full name: Harold Keith McDonald
- Born: 27 June 1922; Nagambie, Victoria
- Died: 12 June 1999 (aged 76); Nagambie, Victoria
- Original team: Nagambie
- Height: 183 cm (6 ft 0 in)
- Weight: 84 kg (185 lb)

Playing career^{1}
Years	Club	Games (Goals)
1944	Carlton	1 (0)
- ^{1} Playing statistics correct to the end of 1958.

Harold Keith McDonald (27 June 1922 – 12 June 1999) was an Australian rules footballer who played with Carlton in the Victorian Football League (VFL).
