= Arch Rock =

Arch Rock may refer to:

== Australia ==
- Arch Rock (Tasmania)

== United States ==
- Arch Rock (Mackinac Island), Michigan
- Arch Rock (Topanga), California
- Arch Rock, part of Point Reyes National Seashore in California
- Arch Rock off Anacapa Island in California

== See also ==
- Natural arch
- Arches National Park
- Three Arch Rocks National Wildlife Refuge, Oregon
