= Archai =

Archai may refer to:

- the plural of Arche, the beginning or the first principle of the world in the ancient Greek philosophy
- Archaï, an album by the Belgian folk band Kadril

== See also ==
- Arche (disambiguation)
