= Fen McDonald =

Australian rules footballer (1891–1915)

Personal information
- Full name: Fenley John McDonald
- Born: 25 May 1891; Nagambie, Victoria
- Died: 25 April 1915 (aged 23); Anzac Cove, Gallipoli, Ottoman Turkey
- Original team: Nagambie
- Height: 175 cm (5 ft 9 in)
- Weight: 70 kg (154 lb)
- Position: Defender

Playing career^{1}
Years	Club	Games (Goals)
1911–12	Carlton	10 (4)
1913	Melbourne	1 (0)
Total		11 (4)
- ^{1} Playing statistics correct to the end of 1913.

Fenley John "Fen" McDonald (25 May 1891 – 25 April 1915) was an Australian rules footballer who played with Carlton and Melbourne in the Victorian Football League (VFL).

He was a member of the First AIF, and was killed in action during the landing at Anzac Cove, Gallipoli, in Ottoman Turkey on 25 April 1915.

== Family ==
The youngest son in the family (of three girls and five boys) of Patrick McDonald (1852–1928), and Margaret McDonald (1853–1928), née Figgins, Fenley John McDonald was born on 25 May 1891 in Nagambie, Victoria. By all accounts, he was a strongly built, quietly spoken, and well-mannered young man.

== Education ==
Educated at the Nagambie State School, he gained a thorough knowledge of cattle and sheep and farming from his family's property, "Winbrae".

In 1910, once he had finished his formal schooling, he moved to Melbourne and began a four-year evening course of studies at the highly regarded Stott and Hoare's Business College, at 426 Collins Street, Melbourne, whilst working in the day time as a stock and station agent with Pearson, Rowe, Smith, and Co., 416 Bourke Street, Melbourne.

== Footballer ==
Two of Fen's brothers played a single VFL match with Essendon, on the same day (Saturday, 9 September 1905): Edwin Patrick "Ted" McDonald (1875–1919), and Archibald William Campbell "Arch" McDonald (1883–1942).

Strongly built (at enlistment he stood 5 ft 7½ in, weighed 11 st 9 lbs, and had an expanded chest measurement of 37 in), McDonald was fast on his feet, and had some success as a handicap runner. Once in Melbourne, he played in the Metropolitan Amateur Football Association competition with the Carlton District team. Carlton noticed his impressive performance, signed him up, and he played his VFL debut, aged 20, against St Kilda, on 29 July 1911 (round fifteen). Carlton thrashed St Kilda by 114 points, and none of the forwards saw much of the ball as most of those up the ground were concentrating on feeding the ball to Carlton's full-forward, Vin Gardiner, who kicked 10 goals. Situated in the back pocket, McDonald saw little of the play – St Kilda only scored 2.3 (15) – yet he did make it down to the forward line and kicked one goal.

During the next season McDonald played nine senior games, mainly in the backline; and at the end of the season, he transferred to Melbourne.

In 1913, he played one senior match for Melbourne, against Essendon on 14 June 1913 (round nine). Essendon beat Melbourne by 41 points. One match report noted that "McDonald was another player who did a lot of hard work for Melbourne under discouraging circumstances", whilst another commented that "McDonald… did very good work".

McDonald then returned to the District team, and did not play another VFL match. He played for the Carlton District team in 1914 as well, and concentrated on completing the last year of his studies.

== Soldier ==
Leaving his employment with Pearson, Rowe, Smith, and Co., 416 Bourke Street, Melbourne, he enlisted in the First AIF on 17 August 1914, and served, as a private, in the 7th Battalion, A.I.F.

His brother, Stanley David McDonald (1888–1945), also served in the First AIF, enlisting on 20 May 1915, before the news of Fen's death had reached his family.

== Death ==
He died at Gallipoli, Ottoman Turkey on during the first landings on 25 April 1915. It is not known how he died; and it is presumed that he was either shot dead or blown up in the process of making the beach.

One of his best mates from Melbourne, Harold Denston, who worked as a clerk in a Collins Street insurance office, was also killed in action at Gallipoli on 25 April 1915.

Claude Crowl who had played his first game for St Kilda on the same day that McDonald made his debut for Carlton, also died in action at Gallipoli on 25 April 1915. A special medal named in McDonald's and Crowl's honour was presented to the best player on the ground in the match played between St Kilda and Carlton on the hundredth anniversary of the Gallipoli landings.

== Remembered ==
McDonald's body was never recovered; and, therefore, he has no marked grave. His name is recorded on the memorial at Lone Pine Memorial, Gallipoli, Turkey, and at panel 50 in the Commemorative Area at the Australian War Memorial.

== See also ==
- List of Australian military personnel killed at Anzac Cove on 25 April 1915
- List of Victorian Football League players who died on active service
- List of Australian rules football families
