= Arche (disambiguation) =

Arche is the beginning or the first principle of the world in the ancient Greek philosophy.

Arche may also refer to:

- Arche (mythology), a Muse
- Arche (moon), a moon of Jupiter
- Arche (album), a 2014 album by Dir En Grey
- Arche (oratorio), a composition by Jörg Widmann
- Die Arche, a 1919 silent science fiction film by Richard Oswald
- Richard Arche, a Canon of Windsor from 1538 to 1553

== See also ==
- Archai (disambiguation)
- Arch (disambiguation)
- Archie (disambiguation)
- Château d'Arche, a Bordeaux wine producer of Sauternes
- Grande Arche, a monument and building in La Défense, France
