= Art Along the Trail =

Art installations in Great Falls, Montana

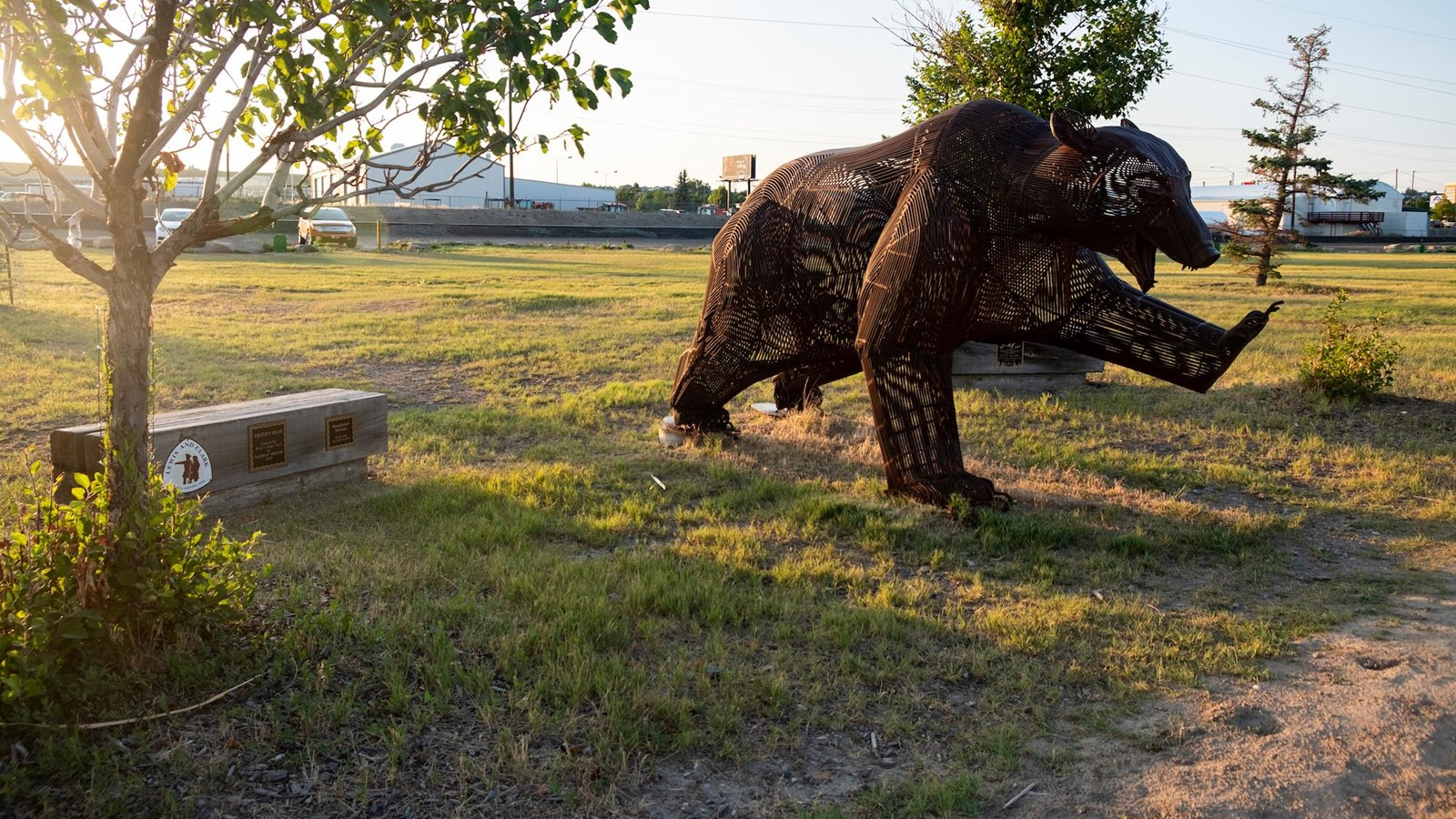
Grizzly Bear Art Sculpture

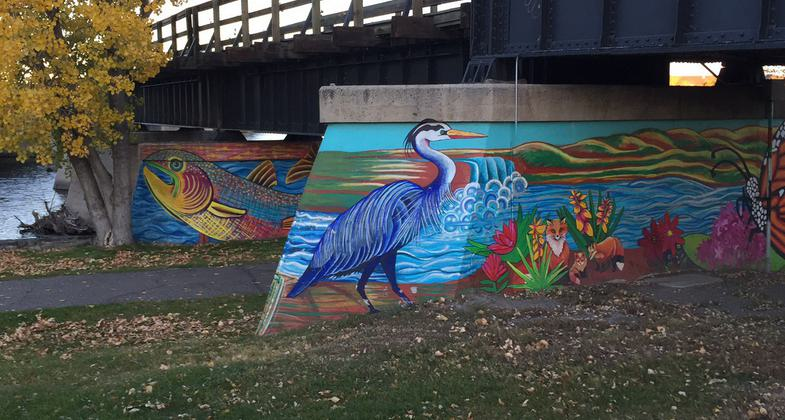
A picture of a mural on River's Edge Trail as part of the Art Along the Trail project

Art Along the Trail is a series of art installations along the River's Edge Trail in Great Falls, Montana. The series contains 27 installations with a variety of styles and artists.

== Installations ==
- Artistic Chain by MT Refining Co – near 9th street Bridge
- Bat House (Adam Blake) – Giant Springs State Park
- Bridge Murals (created by Rachel Kaiser donated by Parks and Recreation) – across from the Milwaukee Station
- Caboose (donated by Burlington Northern) – across the river from Smelter Hill
- Cattails and Geese (Charlie Ringer) – West Bank Park
- Crop Circles (Mike Hollern) – north of the river, east of 9th Street Bridge
- Dead Ringers (Mike Hollern) – Gibson Park
- Gary Trescott Memorial Bow String Equatorial Sundial (Gary Trescott and Dana Woodward) – south of the river, east of 9th street bridge
- Globes (Alex Smithson) – south side of the river, west of 9th street bridge
- Grizzly Bear (Nathan Bread) – West Bank Park
- Keep Runnin' (Kris Madsen) – West Bank Park
- Lewis and Clark and Sacagawea (Mike Woods) – Giant Springs State Park
- Mosaic Metal Towers (Alex Smithson) – 1st Avenue North Bridge
- Oct-tool-pus (Alex Smithson) – West Bank Park
- Ode of Beavers (Mke Hollern) – 1st Avenue North Bridge
- Parade of Geese (creator not stated) – 1st Avenue North Bridge
- Peace Post (creator not stated) – near 9th Street Bridge
- Pelican (Alex Smithson) – Great Falls Federal Courthouse
- Sacagawea (Carol Grende) – Great Falls Federal Courthouse
- Shovel Cone (Alex Smithson) – Milwaukee Station
- Spinning Goldfish (Alex Smithson) – Milwaukee Station
- T Rex (Donatd by Anderson Steel Supply) – Warden Park Gazebo
- Tool Tree (Alex Smithson) – near Great Falls Federal Courthouse
- West Bank Sign (Great Falls Parks and Recreation and kaBOOM) – near West Bank Park
- West Towers (Mike Hollern) – 1st Avenue North Bridge
- Wind Chime (Alex Smithson) – Giant Springs State Park
