= Arch Martin =

American musician (1931–2009)

- 1966 Tony DiPardo Kansas City Chiefs Zing Band. from left Steve Cox, Arch Martin, and Bill Capell

Background information
- Born: April 9, 1931
- Died: March 1, 2009 (aged 77)
- Genres: Jazz
- Instrument: Trombone
- Years active: 1949–c. 1998

Archie Eugene Martin (born April 9, 1931 Independence, Missouri - March 1, 2009 San Diego) was an American jazz trombonist, who was active in the jazz scene of Kansas City.

== Life ==
Arch Martin graduated from William Chrisman High School in 1949, then worked as a professional musician in the Kansas City music scene, where he worked as a freelance musician. played with Clark Terry.

In 1956, Martin recorded under his own name (Kansas City Jazz - The Arch Martin Quintet); his group consisted of tenor saxophonist Dick Busey, Jay Shore (piano), Dave Rizer (bass) and John Terry (drums). For several years he worked in New York with the friend Bob Brookmeyer and as musical director for The Bonnie Sisters; he also went on tour around the 1950s with the orchestras of Claude Thornhill and Woody Herman. In 1961 he became lead trombonist in the Warren Durrett Orchestra and became vice chairman of Kansas City Jazz, Inc.

In 1976, he received the first ever Jess Cole Award from the National Association of Jazz Educators (NAJE). Between 1958 and 1998, he participated in five recording sessions.
