= James Owen (footballer) =

Welsh footballer

Personal information
- Date of birth: 14 January 1991 (age 35)
- Place of birth: Caernarfon, Wales
- Height: 5 ft 10 in (1.78 m)
- Position: Midfielder

Team information
- Current team: Newtown (player/ manager)
- Number: 14

Youth career
- 2007–2009: Chester City

Senior career*
Years	Team	Apps	(Gls)
2008–2010	Chester City	7	(0)
2010–2013	Barrow	95	(2)
2013–2016	Airbus UK Broughton	65	(1)
2016–2022	Connah's Quay Nomads	112	(7)
2022	Caernaerfon Town	0	(0)
2022–2024	Flint Town United	46	(3)
2024–2026	Colwyn Bay	23	(1)
2026–	Newtown	2	(0)

International career
2006–2008	Wales U17	5	(0)

Managerial career
- 2026–: Newtown
- * Club domestic league appearances and goals as of 11:59, 29 August 2026 (UTC)

James Vaughan Owen (born 14 January 1991) is a Welsh football coach and former footballer who is currently player/ manager of Cymru North side Newtown.

== Playing career ==
Born in Caernarfon, Owen is a product of Chester's youth policy and has been capped by Wales at under 17 level. He made his debut in The Football League for Chester away at Port Vale as a late sub when Chester were down to nine men, with his first starting appearance coming at Accrington Stanley in April 2009. He ended the season with seven league appearances to his name, as Chester suffered relegation from Football League Two.

In January 2010, he cancelled his contract with the club by mutual consent. After leaving the club, Owen joined Conference rivals Wrexham on trial, scoring in a 3–2 friendly win over Welsh Premier League side Airbus UK Broughton on 20 January. He failed to gain a contract but later signed for Barrow in the same division. Owen spent three seasons with Barrow, but left when the club was relegated to Conference North at the end of the 2012–13 season.

He joined Welsh Premier League side Airbus UK in August 2013, spending three years with the club before joining Connah's Quay Nomads. He left the club at the end of the 2021–22 season and joined hometown club Caernarfon Town.

== Manager career ==
=== Newtown AFC ===
On 16 June 2026, Owen was appointed manager of Newtown.

== Career statistics ==
As of 6 January 2013

Club	Season	League			FA Cup		League Cup		Other		Total	
Club	Season	Division	Apps	Goals	Apps	Goals	Apps	Goals	Apps	Goals	Apps	Goals
Chester City	2008–09	League Two	7	0	0	0	0	0	0	0	7	0
Chester City	2009–10	Conference	0	0	0	0	0	0	0	0	0	0
Total			7	0	0	0	0	0	0	0	7	0
Barrow	2009–10	Conference	3	0	0	0	0	0	0	0	3	0
Barrow	2010–11	Conference	32	2	0	0	0	0	0	0	32	2
Barrow	2011–12	Conference	33	0	1	0	0	0	0	0	34	0
Barrow	2012–13	Conference	27	0	2	0	0	0	0	0	29	0
Total			95	2	3	0	0	0	0	0	98	2
Career totals			102	2	3	0	0	0	0	0	105	2
