= River's Edge Trail =

Walking and biking trail in Montana

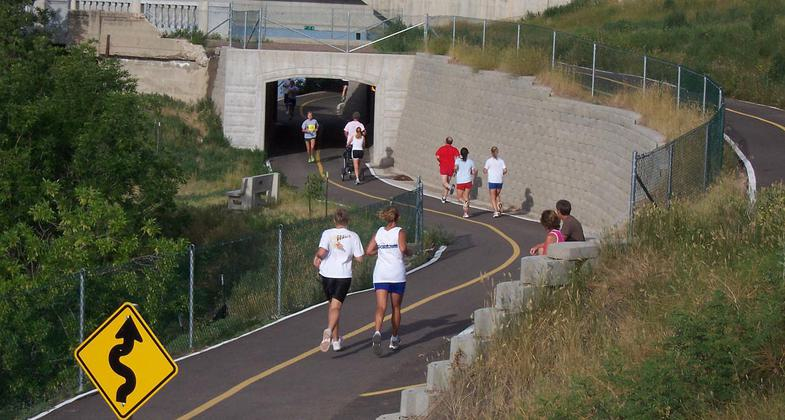

River's Edge Trail
- Location: Lewis and Clark County Montana
- Established: 1991
- Use: hiking, walking, running, cycling, jogging, fishing, skating
- Highest point: 3,450 ft (1,050 m)
- Lowest point: 2,800 ft (850 m)
- Grade: Average 10%
- Difficulty: Moderately challenging
- Season: Year round (spring-summer easily accesible)
- Sights: Dams/Falls of Great Falls
- Surface: asphalt, gravel
- Maintainer: Great Falls Parks and Recreation
- Website: thetrail.org/

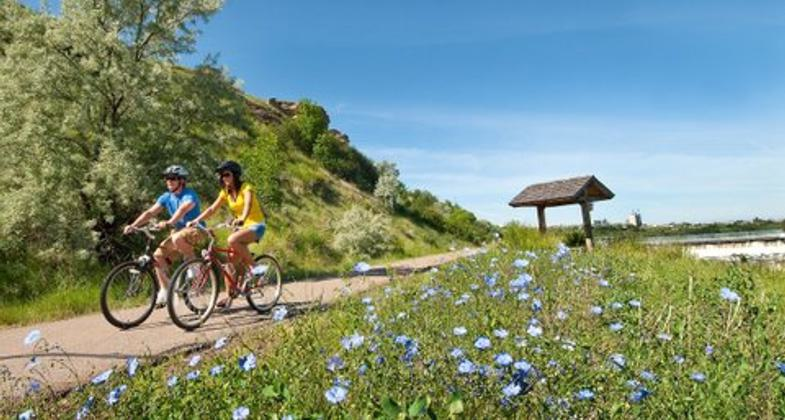
cyclists on River's Edge Trail

The River's Edge Trail is a paved walking and biking trail in Great Falls, Montana. The trail goes along the banks of the Missouri River, with 53 miles of path. The trail hosts several events for the community each year and features over 27 art installments (Art Along the Trail).

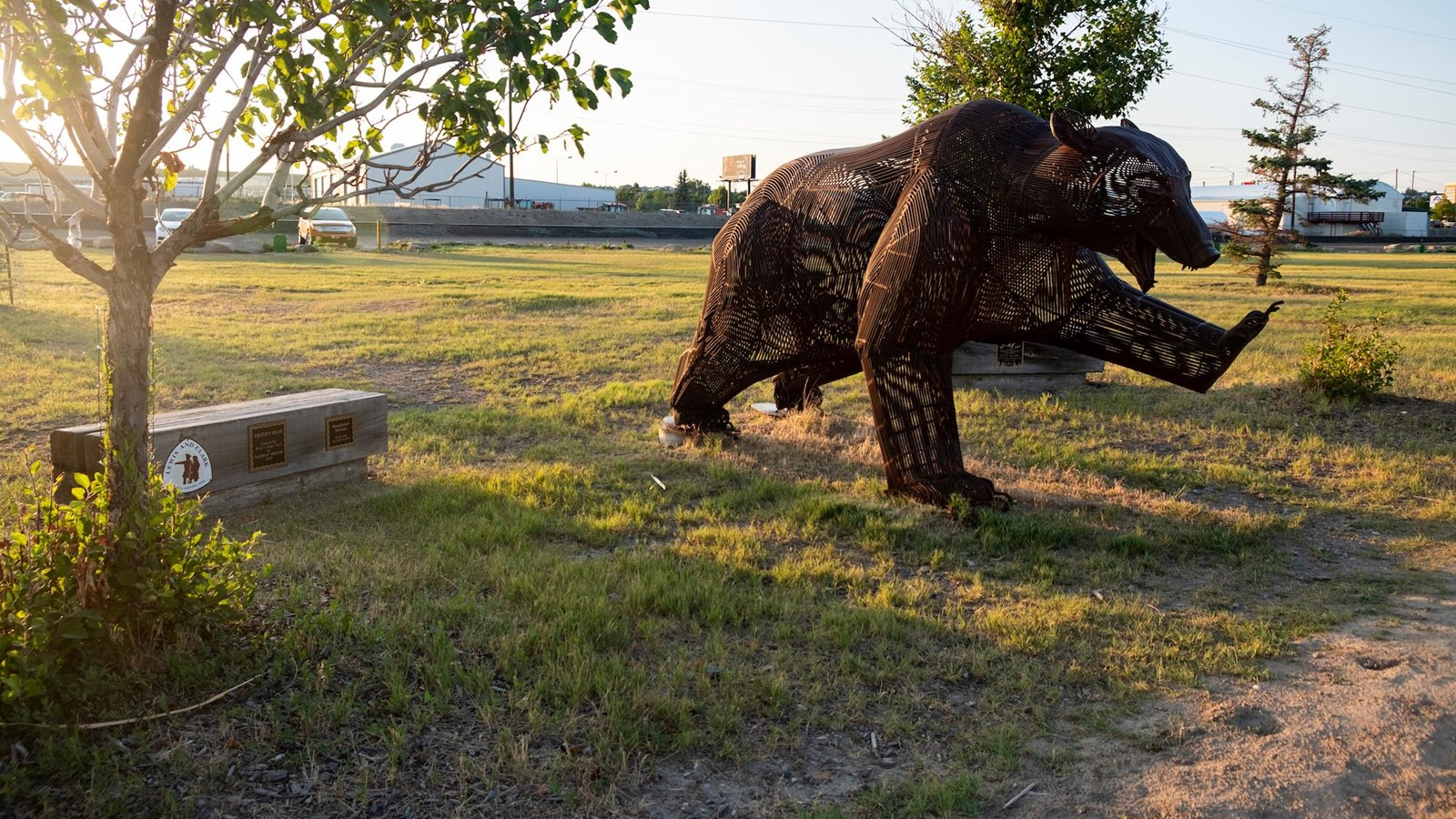
a bear sculpture on the River's Edge Trail

== History ==
The River's Edge Trail takes place on some of the same land in which Lewis and Clark ventured during their famous expedition. Various art installments as part of the Art Along the Trail project feature Lewis and Clark's encounters when in the area, including a buffalo representing one they killed in the area and a grizzly bear representing the exact spot where they were attacked by one. The trail also connects the falls to other historical sites in the city.

The trail was proposed in 1990 as a fitness project called "Vision 2000". Advocates especially saw the oppurtunitity as a good way to remove areas of abandoned urban rail. Additionally in 1990, the TWG (Trails Working Group) was formed to discuss maintenance, safety and devolpement of the trail. The first segment of the trail was completed in 1991, with additional segments being completed ever since. Later after the first completions, the River's Edge Trail Foundation was formed in 1989 to help acquire funds to add on to the trail. Most recently, a single track trail was completed in 2017, improvements were made to the trail to improve compliance with the ADA as well as to add additional art sculptures. Currently, the trail is managed by several local organizations, groups and companies.

== Statistics ==
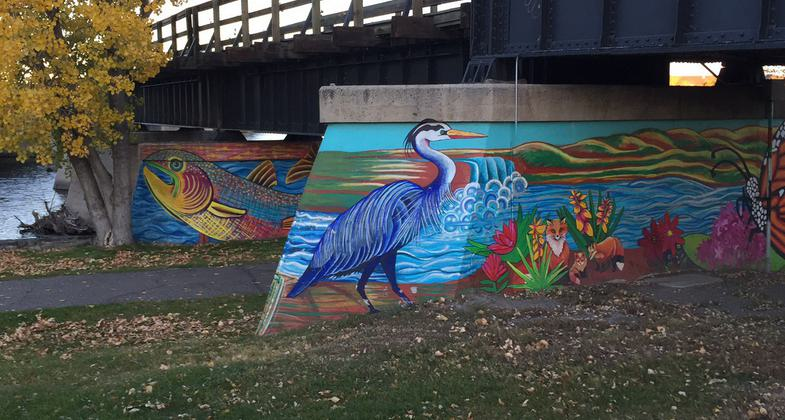
a picture of murals on River's Edge Trail

The trail's highest elevation is 3,450 feet and its lowest is 2,800 feet. The average tread width of the trail is 70 in (180 cm) and the minimum is 15 in (38 cm). The average tread grade of the trail is 10 percent and the maximum is 40. The trail contains an average of 2 cross slopes and its overal length is 53 miles.

== See also ==
- Lewis and Clark County
- Black Eagle Dam
- Black Eagle (CDP)
- Sun River
