= Arch Creek Petroglyphs =

- Arch Creek Petroglyphs (48CK41)
- U.S. National Register of Historic Places
- Nearest city: Moorcroft, Wyoming
- Area: 1 acre (0.40 ha)
- NRHP reference No.: 86003458
- Added to NRHP: December 04, 1986

The Arch Creek Petroglyphs, also known as Site 48CK41 are Native American rock art figures located in Crook County, Wyoming. The site, in the southern Black Hills, is unusual in featuring comparatively long, narrow line figures incised on the rock, compared to more common V-necked anthropomorphs and shield figures. The site is particularly well preserved and is protected.

The site was placed on the National Register of Historic Places in 1986.
