= Arch Rock (Topanga) =

Former landform in California

Coordinates: 34.0395°N 118.5765°W

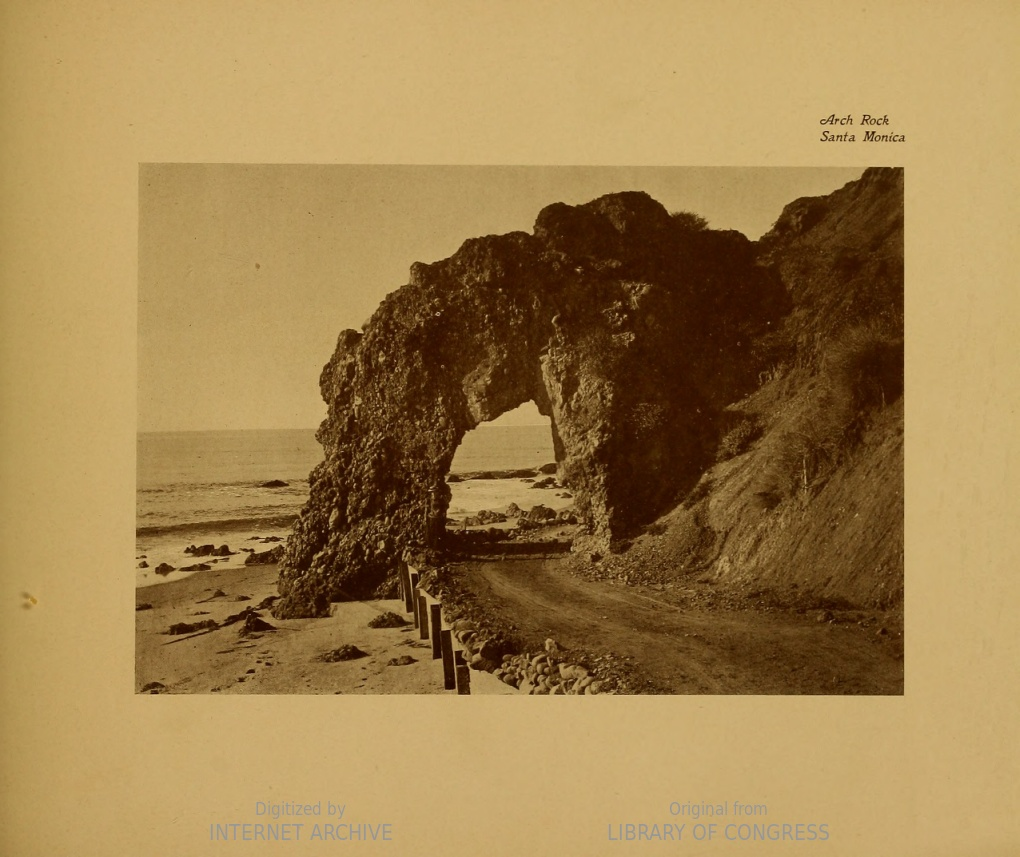
Arch Rock Santa Monica (1904)

Arch Rock was a natural arch formation located just south of Topanga Canyon along the coast of Santa Monica Bay, Los Angeles County, California in the United States.

Arch Rock was located at what is now 18412 Pacific Coast Highway. It was a popular destination for day trips from the young town of Santa Monica. The arch collapsed or was surreptitiously demolished the evening of March 24, 1906, possibly because it was an inconvenient obstacle to creating a coast route for the new-fangled automobiles. Another account says a railroad crew dynamited the formation under cover of darkness. A coach route had previously traveled right under the arch but was only accessible at low tide.

Nearby Castle Rock was demolished as part of a road expansion project in 1945.
