= The Archway =

- Type: Biweekly newspaper
- Format: Broadsheet
- Owner: Bryant University
- Editor-in-chief: Nyatasha Jackowicz
- General manager: Matthew Carvalho
- Founded: 1946
- Language: English
- Headquarters: 1150 Douglas Pike, Smithfield, Rhode Island 02917 U.S.
- Circulation: 5,000
- Website: bryantarchway.com

The Archway is the official newspaper of Bryant University, founded in 1946. The newspaper has been independent of Bryant University since the 1970s, and is completely run by undergraduate students. However, several prominent publishers, journalists, faculty, and staff members act as advisors to The Archway and assist in syndicating those stories across larger mediums. Older editions of The Archway are available in Bryant's institutional repository. The newspaper was published biweekly during the semester on Thursdays. However in 2020, The Archway stopped publishing regularly and has only issued a single annual commencement edition since.
