= Arch Muirhead =

Australian rules footballer

Personal information
- Full name: John Archibald Muirhead
- Born: 25 July 1876; Campbellfield, Victoria
- Died: 22 April 1958 (aged 81); Queensland
- Original team: Fitzroy Juniors
- Position: Defender

Playing career^{1}
Years	Club	Games (Goals)
1897–1898	Fitzroy	16 (3)
1900–1901	St Kilda	33 (1)
Total		49 (4)
- ^{1} Playing statistics correct to the end of 1901.

John Archibald Muirhead (25 July 1876 – 22 April 1958) was an Australian rules footballer who played for the Fitzroy Football Club and St Kilda Football Club in the Victorian Football League (VFL).

== Sources ==
- Holmesby, Russell & Main, Jim (2009). The Encyclopedia of AFL Footballers. 8th ed. Melbourne: Bas Publishing.
- Arch Muirhead's playing statistics from AFL Tables
- Arch Muirhead at AustralianFootball.com
