= Edwin McDonald =

Australian rules footballer (1875–1919)

Personal information
- Full name: Edwin Patrick McDonald
- Born: 29 September 1875; Nagambie, Victoria
- Died: 17 March 1919 (aged 43); Nagambie, Victoria

Playing career^{1}
Years	Club	Games (Goals)
1905	Essendon	1 (1)
- ^{1} Playing statistics correct to the end of 1905.

Edwin Patrick "Ted" McDonald (29 September 1875 – 17 March 1919) was an Australian rules footballer who played with Essendon in the Victorian Football League (VFL).

== Family ==
=== Parents ===
He was born on 29 September 1875 in Nagambie, Victoria. He was the son of Patrick McDonald (1852–1928) and Margaret McDonald (1853–1928), née Figgins.

=== Siblings ===
He was one of five boys and three girls. Two of his brothers also played VFL football: Arch McDonald with Essendon, and Fen McDonald with both Carlton and Melbourne.

Fen enlisted in the First Australian Imperial Force (AIF), and was killed in action during the landing at Anzac Cove, Gallipoli, in Turkey on 25 April 1915. Another brother, Stanley David McDonald (1888–1945), also served in the First AIF, enlisting on 20 May 1915, before the news of Fen's death had reached his family.

=== Wife ===
He married Mary Ann Vaughan (1872–1940) in 1898.

== Football ==
Ted and his younger brother, Arch, played together in their only game with the Essendon First XVIII: the last match of the season, against Fitzroy, at the East Melbourne Cricket Ground, on 9 September 1905.

== The Nagambie Hotel ==
From 1904, until his death in 1919, he was the owner and licensee of The Nagambie Hotel.

== Death ==
He died at Nagambie on 17 March 1919.

== See also ==
- List of Australian rules football families
