= Arch G. Woodside =

- Born: January 9, 1943 (age 83); Pittsburgh, Pennsylvania, United States of America
- Education: Kent State University; Pennsylvania State University; University of Montreal
- Occupations: Author, Marketing Professor and Consultant
- Website: interrupted

Arch G. Woodside (born January 9, 1943, in Pittsburgh, Pennsylvania) is an American marketing author, consultant, and professor; member and Fellow of American Psychological Association, Royal Society of Canada, Association of Psychological Sciences, International Academy for the Study of Tourism, Society for Marketing Advances, and the Global Innovation and Knowledge Academy (GIKA). He is the Editor-in-Chief of Advances in Culture, Tourism, and Hospitality Research book series and the Advances in Business Marketing and Purchasing annual book series and a former Editor-in-Chief of the Journal of Business Research.

== Research ==
In 1989, Woodside published Linking service quality, customer satisfaction, and behavioral intention in the Journal of health care marketing, an article that has been quoted over 1300 times. Arch Woodside is Professor of Marketing at Boston College and Curtin University. His research includes 450 articles in more than 50 SSCI journals including 175 in A* or A journals (ABDC journal list), 50 book chapters, and 50 authored and/or edited books
