= Soviet minesweeper T-117 =

Minesweeper of the Soviet Navy

History

United States
- Name: USS Arch (AMc-121)
- Builder: Tampa Shipbuilding Company
- Reclassified: AM-144, 21 February 1942
- Laid down: 10 October 1942
- Launched: 7 December 1942
- Completed: 6 September 1943
- Fate: Transferred to the Soviet Union, 6 September 1943
- Reclassified: MSF-144, 7 February 1955
- Stricken: 1 January 1983

History

Soviet Union
- Name: T-117
- Acquired: 6 September 1943
- Renamed: TB-22, 15 October 1955
- Renamed: VTR-22, 8 March 1966
- Fate: Scrapped, 19 September 1967

General characteristics
- Class & type: Admirable-class minesweeper
- Displacement: 650 tons
- Length: 184 ft 6 in (56.24 m)
- Beam: 33 ft (10 m)
- Draft: 9 ft 9 in (2.97 m)
- Propulsion: 2 × ALCO 539 diesel engines, 1,710 shp (1.3 MW); Farrel-Birmingham single reduction gear; 2 shafts
- Speed: 14.8 knots (27.4 km/h)
- Complement: 104
- Armament: 1 × 3-inch/50-caliber gun DP; 2 × twin Bofors 40 mm guns; 1 × Hedgehog anti-submarine mortar; 2 × Depth charge tracks

T-117 was a minesweeper of the Soviet Navy during World War II and the Cold War. She had originally been built as USS Arch (AM-144), an Admirable-class minesweeper, for the United States Navy during World War II, but never saw active service in the U.S. Navy. Upon completion she was transferred to the Soviet Union under Lend-Lease as T-117; she was never returned to the United States. The ship was renamed several times in Soviet service and was scrapped on 19 September 1967. Because of the Cold War, the U.S. Navy was unaware of this fate and the vessel remained on the American Naval Vessel Register until she was struck on 1 January 1983.

== Career ==
Arch was laid down on 18 October 1942 at Tampa, Florida, by the Tampa Shipbuilding Co.; launched on 7 December 1942; sponsored by Mrs. A. M. Kearny; and completed on 6 September 1943. She was transferred to the Soviet Navy that same day as T-117. She was never returned to U.S. custody.

In Soviet service, the ship was renamed TB-22 on 15 October 1955, and VTR-22 on 8 March 1966. She was eventually scrapped on 19 September 1967.

Due to the ongoing Cold War, the U.S. Navy was unaware of this fate. They had reclassified the vessel as MSF-144 on 7 February 1955, and kept her on the American Naval Vessel Register until she was struck on 1 January 1983.
