= Arch Creek (Montana) =

Stream in Carbon County, Montana, United States

Coordinates: 45°9′29.33″N 109°40′38.93″W

Arch Creek is a stream in Carbon County, Montana, in the United States.

Arch Creek was named from a nearby natural arch.

== See also ==
- List of rivers of Montana
