= ARCH+ =

German architectural design magazine

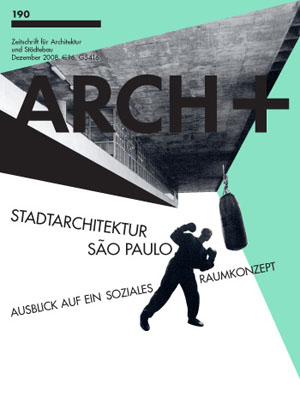
- ARCH+ issue 190, December 2008
- Editors: Nikolaus Kuhnert, Sabine Kraft, Anh-linh Ngo
- Frequency: Quarterly
- Circulation: 10,000
- Publisher: ARCH+ Verlag
- Founded: 1968
- Country: Germany
- Based in: Berlin and Aachen
- Language: German
- Website: archplus.net
- ISSN: 0587-3452
- OCLC: 224511701

ARCH+ is a quarterly German magazine for architecture, urbanism, and design that was established in 1967. The magazine has been praised by a number of different architects and publications.

== History ==
A group of architecture students and junior faculty from the University of Stuttgart established ARCH+ in 1967 and its first issue appeared in January of the following year. Despite forming concurrent to the student protest movement of 1968, the magazine's content was not explicitly political in its first years. Early issues focused on technocratic aspects of architecture and urbanism, such as planning theory, semiotics, mathematics, and cybernetics.

In the early 1970s, growing ideological divides among the publication's contributors led to the establishment of splinter editorial groups in West Berlin and Aachen. A new wave of editors effected a politicization of the magazine, which came to focus increasingly on the sociological issues surrounding the built environment.

While this progressive political orientation has stayed with the magazine until today, subsequent decades saw an increase in attention to other aspects of the field, including: aesthetics and postmodernism in the late 1970s, the legacy of the modern movement in the mid-1980s, and high-tech architecture in the 1990s.

Since 2000, ARCH+ has expanded its scope of activities to include exhibition design, exhibition catalogs, a lecture and conversation series, research projects, and competitions. In 2010, ARCH+ released one of its first fully bilingual publications, Post-Oil City, which was followed by its first bilingual issue, Think Global, Build Social!, in 2013. The issue also served as a catalog for an eponymous exhibition at the German Architecture Museum in Frankfurt am Main.

== Content ==
ARCH+ is one of the largest and oldest periodicals in Germany that focuses on architectural history and theory. Every issue is devoted to a particular subject, place, or theme; recent topics include contemporary Japanese architecture, social housing design, service architecture, and shrinking cities. Contemporary buildings are featured to illustrate the topic, while timelines and reference projects are meant to situate the topic in broader historical and cultural contexts. Issues regularly include long-form essays by academics and architects as well. The Zeitung section of every issue features book and exhibition reviews.

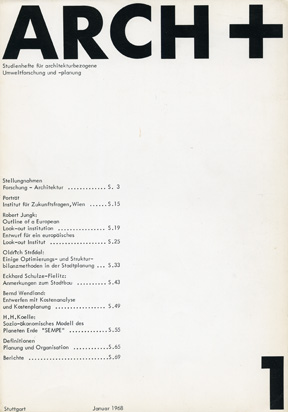
Issue 1, January 1968

Issue 174/175, December 2005

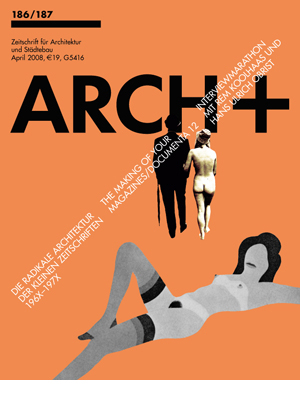
Issue 186/187, April 2008

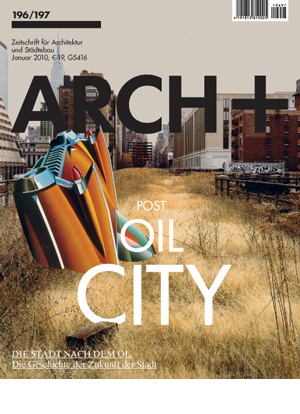
Issue 196/197, February 2010
