= The Bonnie Sisters =

American pop group

The Bonnie Sisters were an American pop group from New York City.

The three members, Pat Ryan, Sylvia Totter and Jean Borgia, were all nurses at Bellevue Hospital. After hearing The DeJohn Sisters on the radio, they began singing together at work, calling themselves The Belle Aimes initially. After performing on Arthur Godfrey's television show, they were signed by Mickey Baker to Rainbow Records and changed their name to The Bonnie Sisters at the behest of Rainbow owner Eddie Heller. Their first recording was "Cry Baby", originally a B-side recorded by The Scarlets. The tune became a hit in the U.S., peaking at #18 on the Billboard Hot 100 in 1956. Follow-up singles "Track That Cat", "Wandering Heart", and "Confess" failed to chart, and the group returned to nursing.

The 1990 John Waters movie, Cry-Baby, is named after the group's lone hit.

Eugenia "Jean" Borgia Murray died on October 23, 2018, at the age of 84.

== Fashion ==
The members wore identical tartan skirts and blouses.

== Members ==
- Pat Ryan
- Sylvia Totter
- Jean Borgia

== Sources ==
- The Bonnie Sisters at Allmusic
