= Arch McDonald (footballer) =

Australian rules footballer (1882–1932)

Personal information
- Full name: Archibald William Campbell McDonald
- Born: 25 December 1882; Nagambie, Victoria
- Died: 20 July 1932 (aged 49); Melbourne, Victoria

Playing career^{1}
Years	Club	Games (Goals)
1905	Essendon	1 (0)
- ^{1} Playing statistics correct to the end of 1905.

Archibald William Campbell McDonald (25 December 1882 – 20 July 1932) was an Australian rules footballer who played for the Essendon Football Club in the Victorian Football League (VFL).

== Family ==
=== Parents ===
The son of Patrick McDonald (1852–1928), and Margaret McDonald (1853–1928), née Figgins, Archibald William Campbell McDonald, one of five boys and three girls, was born on 25 December 1882 in Nagambie, Victoria.

=== Siblings ===
Two of his brothers, Edwin Patrick "Ted" McDonald (1875–1919), and Fenley John "Fen" McDonald (1891–1915) also played VFL football; Ted, with Essendon, and Fen with both Carlton and Melbourne.

Fen enlisted in the First AIF, and was killed in action during the landing at Anzac Cove, Gallipoli, in Turkey on 25 April 1915. Another brother, Stanley David McDonald (1888–1945), also served in the First AIF, enlisting on 20 May 1915, before the news of Fen's death had reached his family.

Arch married Susan Lillian Patten (1884–1972) in 1910.

== Football ==
Arch and Ted played together in their only game with the Essendon First XVIII: the last match of the season, against Fitzroy, at the East Melbourne Cricket Ground, on 9 September 1905.

== Death ==
He died in Melbourne on 20 July 1932.

== See also ==
- List of Australian rules football families
