= Don Wallace (footballer) =

Australian rules footballer

Personal information
- Full name: Donald Neville Wallace
- Born: 11 August 1898; Cowwarr, Victoria
- Died: 10 March 1969 (aged 70); Footscray, Victoria
- Original team: Nagambie

Playing career^{1}
Years	Club	Games (Goals)
1927	Footscray	8 (4)
- ^{1} Playing statistics correct to the end of 1927.

Donald Neville Wallace (11 August 1898 – 10 March 1969) was an Australian rules footballer who played with Footscray in the Victorian Football League (VFL).
