= Graeme Taylor (footballer) =

Australian rules footballer

Personal information
- Full name: Graeme Taylor
- Born: 5 June 1942
- Original team: Nagambie
- Height: 185 cm (6 ft 1 in)
- Weight: 89 kg (196 lb)

Playing career^{1}
Years	Club	Games (Goals)
1961–62	Footscray	2 (0)
- ^{1} Playing statistics correct to the end of 1962.

Graeme Taylor (born 5 June 1942) is a former Australian rules footballer who played with Footscray in the Victorian Football League (VFL).
