= Ark =

Ark or ARK may refer to:

== Biblical narratives and religion ==
- Noah's Ark, the massive vessel to save the world's animals from a flood
- Ark of bulrushes, the boat of the infant Moses
- Ark of the Covenant, the chest for the tablets of the Ten Commandments
- Torah ark, a cabinet used to store a synagogue's Torah scrolls

== Arts, entertainment and media ==
=== Fictional entities ===
- Ark, a planet in the Noon Universe
- Ark (Transformers), a spacecraft
- ARK, space colony in the video games Sonic Adventure 2 and Shadow the Hedgehog
- Ark, in the video game Terranigma
- The Ark (Halo), a control station
- The Ark, space station in the TV series The 100
- The Ark, the main setting of the game Brink
- The Ark, fictional band from Alice Oseman's novel I Was Born For This
- The Ark of Truth, in Stargate: The Ark of Truth

=== Film and television ===
- Ark (film), a 2005 animated science fiction film
- Ark, a 1970 short film by Rolf Forsberg
- Ark (web series), a 2010 science fiction series by Trey Stokes
- Ark: The Animated Series, a 2024 TV series based on the video game Ark: Survival Evolved
- Stargate: The Ark of Truth, a 2008 military science fiction film sequel to the TV series Stargate SG-1
- The Ark (film), a 2015 biblical BBC TV film
- The Ark (Doctor Who), a 1966 Doctor Who TV serial
- The Ark (TV series), a 2023 American science fiction TV series
- "The Ark", a 2007 episode of Stargate Atlantis season 3
- The Ark in Space, a 1975 Doctor Who TV serial

=== Gaming ===
- Ark: Survival Evolved, a 2017 video game
- Ark: Survival Ascended, a 2023 remaster of Ark: Survival Evolved

=== Literature ===
- Ark (novel), by Stephen Baxter, 2009
- ARK, a long poem by Ronald Johnson (1935–1998)
- "Ark", 2019 poem by Simon Armitage to commemorate launch of RRS Sir David Attenborough
- The Ark, a weekly newspaper in Tiburon, California

=== Music ===
==== Bands ====
- Ark (British band), a 1985 melodic rock band
- Ark (Bangladeshi band), a 1991 Bangladeshi rock band
- The Ark (Swedish band), a 1991 Swedish glam-rock band
- Ark (Norwegian band), a 1999 progressive metal band
- The Ark, a 2015 South Korean girl group with members including Euna Kim and Lee Su-ji

==== Albums and songs ====
- Ark (The Animals album), 1983, by the original members of the Animals
- Ark (Brendan Perry album), 2010
- Ark (Crossfaith album), 2024
- Ark (In Hearts Wake album), 2017
- Ark (L'Arc-en-Ciel album), 1999
- Ark (We Are the Ocean album), 2015
- Ark, 2020 reissue of Here Comes the Indian, a 2003 album by Animal Collective
- The Ark (album), by Frank Zappa, 1991
- The Ark (EP), by Swedish band The Ark, 1996
- "The Ark", a song by Dr. Dog from the 2008 album Fate

== Businesses and organizations ==
- Ark (charity), international children's educational charity, parent organisation of Ark Schools
- Ark (organisation), international project helping Russian emigrants
- Ark Airways, a cargo airline from Armenia
- Ark Clothing, former subsidiary of JD Sports PLC
- Ark Diecast, toy company
- Ark Ecological NGO, in Armenia
- Ark Invest, American asset management firm
- ARK Music Factory, American musical composition and production company
- ARK Theatre Company, in Los Angeles, California, US
- ARK Logic, American computer graphics hardware company

== Places ==
=== Buildings ===
- Ark of Bukhara, Uzbekistan
- The Ark (Duke University), US, a dance studio
- The Ark (folk venue), in Ann Arbor, Michigan, US
- The Ark (Prince Edward Island), Canada, a bioshelter
- The Ark (Tadcaster), England, a historic building
- The Ark, London, England, an office block
- Ark Hills, office complex in Tokyo, Japan
- Coca-Cola Place, originally known as The Ark, a commercial office tower in North Sydney, Australia

=== Settlements ===
- Arkansas, United States
- Ark, Iran (disambiguation), several places
- Ark, Missouri, United States
- Ark, Virginia, United States
- SAO Bosanska Krajina, or Autonomous Region of Krajina (ARK), in Bosnia and Herzegovina

=== Other places ===
- The Ark (Antarctica), a rock summit

== Science and technology ==
- Ark (search engine), a people search engine
- Ark (software), a file archiver and compressor
- Archival Resource Key, a multi-purpose URL
- Ark Linux, a software distribution founded by Bernhard Rosenkränzer
- Archaeological Recording Kit, software for recording and disseminating archaeological data
- Ark Compiler, a Huawei unified compilation and runtime platform

== Transportation ==
- Ark (river boat), a temporary boat used in river transport in eastern North America
- The Ark (ship), used in founding the province of Maryland
- The Ark, a floating laboratory ship, later University Marine Biological Station Millport, Scotland
- The Ark, an unfinished sculpture in the form of a functional ship by Kea Tawana in Newark, New Jersey, US
- Arusha Airport, Tanzania, IATA airport code ARK
- Arkadelphia station, Arkansas, US, Amtrak station code ARK
- Armoured Ramp Carrier (ARK), a specialist armoured vehicle

== Other uses ==
- Ark Prize of the Free Word, a literary prize
- Armijska Ratna Komanda D-0, or the Ark, a nuclear bunker in Bosnia and Herzegovina
- ARK (Northern Ireland) (Access Research Knowledge), Northern Irish website
- Interstellar ark, an idea of a spaceship that saves humanity from a catastrophe

== See also ==
- Ark 2 (disambiguation)
- Arc (disambiguation)
- ARC (disambiguation)
- Arch (disambiguation)
- Arkana (disambiguation)
- ARQ (disambiguation)
- ARRC (disambiguation)
- HMS Ark Royal, the name of several ships of the British Royal Navy
- Noah's Ark (disambiguation)
