= Arx =

Arx, ARX, or ArX may refer to:

- ARX (Algorithmic Research Ltd.), a digital security company
- ARX (gene), Aristaless related homeobox
- ARX (operating system), an operating system
- Arx (Roman), a Roman citadel, and in particular:
  - The northern hump of the two forming the Capitoline Hill of ancient Rome
- Arx, Landes, a commune of the Landes département in France
- Arx Fatalis, a first person role-playing game developed by Arkane Studios in 2002
- Arx, a sculpture by Lars Vilks
- Americas Rallycross Championship, also known as ARX Rallycross
- Add-Rotate-XOR; see block cipher
- Josef Adolph von Arx (1922-1988), mycologist from the Netherlands

== See also ==
- Beretta ARX160, an assault rifle
- ObjectARX, a software API for AutoCAD
- ARCS (disambiguation)
- Arcs (disambiguation)
- ARC (disambiguation)
- Arc (disambiguation)
- Ark (disambiguation)
- Arq (disambiguation)
