= ARQ =

ARQ or Arq may refer to:

== Arts, entertainment, media ==
- Arq (comics), a comic book by Andreas
- ARQ (film), a 2016 American film
- ARQ (journal), an architecture journal

== Computing, communications ==
- Automatic Repeat-reQuest, an error control mechanism for data transmission
- ARQ, an admission request in H.323 Registration, Admission and Status (RAS) messages
- ARQ, a query engine for Jena

== Groups, organizations ==
- Armée révolutionnaire du Québec, a predecessor to the FLQ; see Timeline of the Front de libération du Québec
- Ark Airways (ICAO airline code ARQ), Armenian airline
- Arq Group, Australian digital services provider

== Places ==
- Neuquén Province (ISO 3166 location code AR-Q), Argentina
- El Troncal Airport (IATA airport code ARQ), Arauquita, Arauca, Colombia

== Other uses ==
- Algerian Arabic (ISO 639-3 language code arq)
- Annual Rifle Qualification, U.S. Marine Corps; see Stone Bay

== See also ==
- Arc (disambiguation)
- ARC (disambiguation)
- Ark (disambiguation)
- Arx (disambiguation)
