= Bero =

Bero may refer to:

Places:

- Bero (woreda), a woreda in Ethiopia
- Bero block, an administrative block in Ranchi district, Jharkhand, India
  - Bero, India, a village in Jharkhand, India
- Bero River, Angola

People:

- Bero (name), a list of people with either the given name or surname
- Bernhard Rosenkränzer, free-software developer

Other uses:

- Bero railway station, in Purulia district, West Bengal, India
- Bero Field, a private airport in Oregon, United States
- Bero (fish), a genus of Sculpin fish
- Be-Ro, a flour brand
- Owiniga language, also known as Bero, spoken in New Guinea

== See also ==
- Bera (disambiguation)
- Beru (disambiguation)
