= Ark, Iran =

Ark, Iran (Persian: ارك) may refer to:

- Ark, Bojnord, a village in Bojnord County, North Khorasan Province
- Ark, Fariman, a village in Fariman County, Razavi Khorasan Province
- Ark, Jajrom, a village in Jajrom County, North Khorasan Province
- Ark, Jowayin, a village in Jowayin County, Razavi Khorasan Province
- Ark, Qazvin, a village in Qazvin County, Qazvin Province
- Ark, South Khorasan, a village in Khusf County, South Khorasan Province

== See also ==
- Ark (disambiguation)
