= ARCS =

ARCS may stand for:

- ARCS Foundation (Achievement Rewards for College Scientists)
- Alabama Regional Communications System, a radio/alert notification communications district in the State of Alabama
- Associate of the Royal College of Science
- Admiralty Raster Chart Service
- Alaska Rural Communications Service
- Anglia Regional Co-operative Society, a consumer co-operative in the UK
- Wide Angular-Range Chopper Spectrometer, a spectrometer at the Spallation Neutron Source
- Archaeosine synthase, an enzyme

== See also ==
- ARC (disambiguation)
- Arcs (disambiguation)
- Arx (disambiguation)
