= Bera (surname) =

Bera is a surname.

- A. K. Bera, Indian banker
- Ami Bera (born 1965), American physician and politician
- Anil K. Bera (born 1955), Indian econometrician
- Fran Bera (1924–2018), American aviator
- Mulu Ayar Bera, Indian politician
- Nathalie Béra-Tagrine (born 1960), French classical pianist of Russian descent
- Richard Sam Bera (born 1971), Indonesian swimmer
- Victoire Léodile Béra (1824–1900), French novelist, journalist and feminist
- Willie Bera (born 1964), Papua New Guinean footballer

== See also ==
- Bera (disambiguation)
