= Beru =

Beru may refer to:

- Beru (atoll), part of Kiribati
- Beru Group, a diesel cold start systems company
- Sherab Palden Beru, a Tibetan painter
- Béru, a village in the Yonne department, in France
- Beru (film) a 2004 Indian Kannada-language film directed by P. Sheshadri, starring Suchendra Prasad and H. G. Dattatreya
- Beru Whitesun, from Star Wars
- Beru, a character from the 2019 film Doraemon: Nobita's Chronicle of the Moon Exploration

== See also ==
- Bero (disambiguation)
- Bera (disambiguation)
