= Harald Espelund =

Norwegian politician

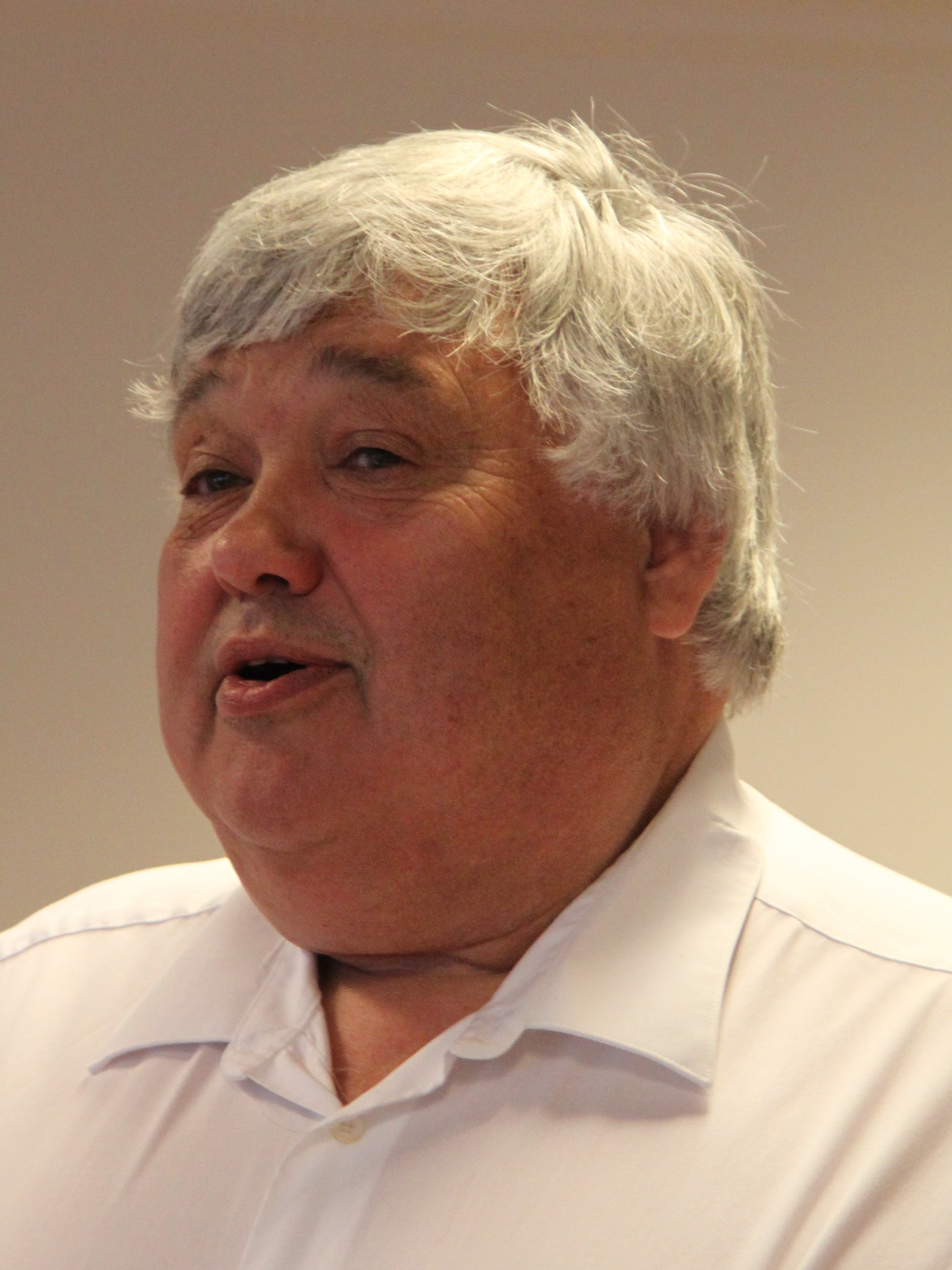

Harald Espelund (born 10 December 1948) is a Norwegian politician for the Progress Party.

He served as a deputy representative to the Norwegian Parliament from Akershus during the term 2001–2005.

On the local level he was the mayor of Ullensaker from 2003 to 2015. Outside politics he is an organic farmer.

He was elected to the Executive Committee of the Airport Regions Conference in 2010.
