= RX J0821+0752 BCG =

Type-cD galaxy in the constellation Cancer

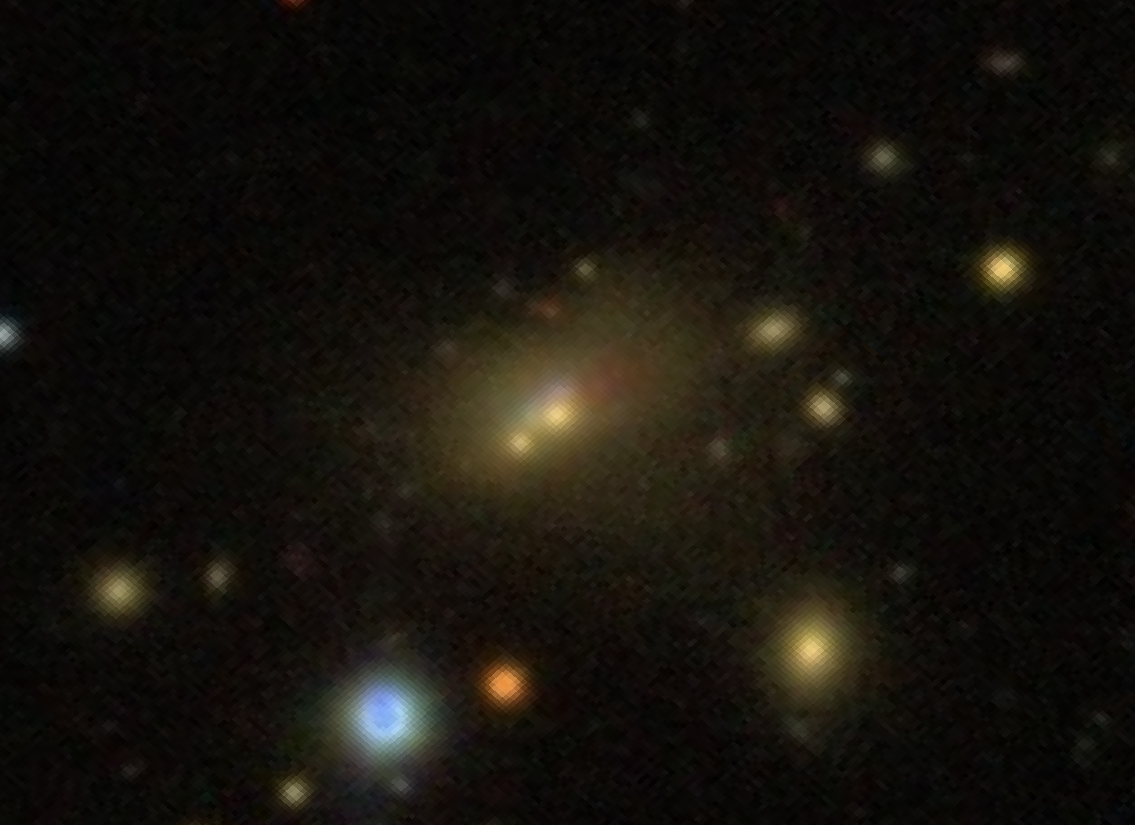
- SDSS image of RX J0821+0752 BCG.

Observation data (J2000.0 epoch)
- Constellation: Cancer
- Right ascension: 08^{h} 21^{m} 02.09^{s}
- Declination: +07° 51′ 47.60″
- Redshift: 0.110000
- Heliocentric radial velocity: 32,977 km/s ± 300
- Distance: 1.589 Gly (487.28 Mpc)
- Group or cluster: RX J0821+0752

Characteristics
- Type: cD;BrClG
- Size: ~495,000 ly (151.9 kpc) (estimated)

Other designations
- 2MASX J08210226+0751479, LEDA 1332897, GMBCG J125.25942+07.86314 BCG, RX J0820.9+0751:[FDE2024] BCG, SDSS J082102.26+075147.2, MaNGA 01-605178

RX J0821+0752 BCG (short for RX J0821+0752 Brightest Cluster Galaxy), is a massive Type-cD galaxy residing as the brightest cluster galaxy (BCG) of a cool core galaxy cluster RX J0821+0752 (RX J0820.9+0752). It is located in the constellation of Cancer and it has a redshift of (z) 0.110.

== Description ==
RX J0821+0752 BCG is classified as an active central galaxy dominating the center of RX J0821+0752. It is known to host a weak radio source with it displaying no signs of any discernible structures on 2 to 5 arcseconds scales. The flux density of the source is found to be estimated around 0.73 ± 0.09 mJy at 4.89 GHz frequencies and the radio power is relatively low with a value of 1.2 × 10^{23} W Hz^{−1} at around 1.4 GHz. A head-tail radio galaxy is located in southwest direction from it with its radio emission being orientated in a position angle of 35° from a dust plume feature that is west of the BCG. The total star formation of the galaxy is estimated to be 37 M_{☉} per year and the infrared luminosity of the galaxy is found to be 8.47 × 10^{44} erg s^{−1}. Its optical spectrum is found characterized by both hydrogen-alpha and also ionized neon emission lines.

The galaxy is categorized as one of the most gas-rich BCGs. When observed, it is found to host a molecular gas reservoir. Further evidence also found the gas reservoir is located by a few kiloparsecs away from its central nucleus, with the cold gas being mainly concentrated into at least two gas clumps that is surrounded by a diffused envelope that is about 2-5 kiloparsecs wide. There is some molecular gas being distributed along a filament feature, which is offset by four kiloparsecs from the galactic center. One of the clumps is shown to be located at the eastern end from the filament feature and around three kiloparsecs north from the nucleus region. An arc of excessive radio emission is found surrounding the northeast portion of the BCG according to optical imaging, which could be contributed by emission lines. Furthermore, the arc is also shown orientating towards another galaxy located 7.7 kiloparsecs away from the BCG, indicating they might be interacting. One of the regions in the BCG contains traces of stellar emission with the stellar luminosity being estimated as 2.3 × 10^{43} erg s^{−1}.

A study published in 2007, has found RX J0821+0752 BCG has a bright emission-line nebula surrounding it. The nebula is shown to have an X-ray surface brightness envelope that is mainly concentrated on it with an extension towards the direction of northwest as both the carbon oxide and hydrogen-alpha emission. Evidence has also found the two regions that are located north by 3.7 kiloparsecs and northwest by 16.9 kiloparsecs, are linked together by a filament feature of low velocity. This gas is suggested as undisturbed with only the disturbed gas being located mainly within a small region that is in southwest direction from the nucleus region.
