= Learning Disability Coalition =

The Learning Disability Coalition (LDC) is a group of fourteen organisations which campaigns to secure better funding for social care for people with learning disabilities in England.

The Coalition was formed in May 2007. It believes that better funding from the UK Government is required to help people with learning disabilities to secure a full range of rights and opportunities. The LDC aims to provide a unified voice for people with learning disabilities to government and other key decision makers; to raise awareness of financial pressures on services, and achieve an evidence-based assessment of the long-term resource requirements for people with learning disabilities.

The organization shut down independent operations to become a "special interest group" within the Voluntary Organisations Disability Group in 2012.

== Members ==
- The Foundation for People with Learning Disabilities
- Mencap
- People First
- National Forum for People with Learning Difficulties
- Sense
- Turning Point
- Down's Syndrome Association
- United Response
- BILD (British Institute of Learning Disabilities)
- ARC Association for Real Change
- National Autistic Society
- Real Life Options
- National Family Carer Network
- Voyage
- The Hesley Group

== Protect the Frontline ==
In 2010 the LDC launched its 'Protect the Frontline' campaign which is calling on politicians to keep to their promises and protect frontline services for people with a learning disability. As part of the campaign, the LDC produced 'Stories from the Frontline', which included a series of diaries by people with a learning disability. These diaries helped to show the importance of frontline social care and the difference that it makes to their lives and the lives of their families. The LDC has been monitoring cuts to social care through its cutswatch feature, and since the announcement of the Comprehensive Spending Review, has been calling on local councillors to ensure that social care spending is protected at a local level.

== Management ==
The Coalition's Directors were Heather Honour in 2008 and later Anthea Sully and its Co-Chairs were Andrew Lee, Director of People First and Mark Goldring, Chief Executive of Mencap.
