= ARC =

ARC may refer to:

== Arts and entertainment ==
=== Arts organizations ===
- ARC Magazine (Art. Recognition. Culture.), Caribbean
- ARChive of Contemporary Music, a music repository in New York City, US
- Art Renewal Center
- Canadian artist-run centres

=== Other uses in arts and media ===
- Advance reading copy of a book, for reviewers, librarians, and booksellers
- A.R.C. (album), 1971, by Chick Corea, Dave Holland, and Barry Altschul
- ARC Magazine (Art. Recognition. Culture.), Caribbean
- ARC Raiders, a game
- Attack Retrieve Capture, a game
- Advanced Recon Commandos (ARC troopers), a variant of clone trooper in the Star Wars franchise
- Armored Response Coalition, a fictional organization in the 2020 video game Doom Eternal

== Businesses ==
=== Architecture and construction ===
- Amey Roadstone Construction, a former British construction company
- ARC/Architectural Resources Cambridge, Inc., Cambridge, Massachusetts

=== Manufacturing ===
- Aircraft Radio Corporation, a major avionics manufacturer from the 1920s to the '50s
- ARC Diversified, a Cookeville, Tennessee non-profit that employs the severely disabled

=== Mining ===
- Amalgamated Roadstone Corporation, a British stone quarrying company
- ARC Resources, a Canadian oil and natural gas company

=== Record companies ===
- American Record Company (1904–1908, re-activated 1979), one of two US record labels by this name
- American Record Corporation (1929–1938), a US record label also known as American Record Company
- ARC (American Recording Company) (1978-present), a vanity label for Earth, Wind & Fire

=== Other businesses ===
- Airlines Reporting Corporation, an airline-owned company that provides ticket distribution, reporting, and settlement services
- Airport Regions Council, a European organization of major airports
- Alignment Research Center, an AI alignment research organization
- Aqaba Railway Corporation, a freight railway in Jordan
- ARC International, a computer processor designer, and a subsidiary of Synopsys
- Arena Racing Company, a British racecourse owning group

== Government and military ==
=== National ===
==== Civilian ====
- Administrative Reforms Commission, an Indian Government commission
- Agence du revenu du Canada, the French-language name for the Canada Revenue Agency
- Alien registration card (Japan), for foreign residents of Japan
- Alien Resident Certificate, for foreign residents of Taiwan
- Ames Research Center, a NASA facility located at Moffett Federal Airfield, California
- Australian Research Council, a government agency for allocating research funding
- Aviation Research Centre, a part of the Research and Analysis Wing (R&AW) of the Cabinet Secretariat, India

==== Military ====
- Administrative Reform Council, the military regime that governed Thailand following the 2006 coup d'état
- Armada de la República de Colombia: the Colombian Navy, and the prefix "ARC" before the name of any of its ships
- Aviation Royale Canadienne, the French-language name for the Royal Canadian Air Force
- Cable repair ship (ARC), a US Navy hull classification

=== Sub-national ===
- Appalachian Regional Commission, a US federal-state partnership
- Atlanta Regional Commission, a regional planning and intergovernmental coordination agency
- Auckland Regional Council, a former New Zealand local government entity
- Autonomous Republic of Crimea, an internationally recognized autonomous republic in Ukraine

== Humanitarian, activist and religious organizations ==
- Abortion Rights Campaign, Ireland
- African Rainforest Conservancy
- Alliance for Responsible Citizenship
- Alliance of Reformed Churches
- Alliance of Religions and Conservation, UK
- American Red Cross
- American Refugee Committee
- Anti-Recidivism Coalition, Los Angeles, US
- ARC Association for Real Change, of UK providers of services to people with a learning disability
- Arc of the United States
- Arthritis Research Campaign, UK
- Australian Red Cross
- Autism Resource Centre (Singapore), a Singapore-based non-profit organisation
- Society for the Arts, Religion and Contemporary Culture, US
- Alliance Rose Croix, another name for the Order of the Solar Temple

== Science, technology, and research ==
=== Biology and medicine ===
- ARC (protein) (activity-regulated cytoskeleton-associated protein)
- AIDS-related complex, a condition in which antibody tests are positive for HIV
- Allergic rhinoconjunctivitis, inflammation of the conjunctiva and nose due to allergy
- Arcuate nucleus (hypothalamus), an aggregation of neurons in the mediobasal hypothalamus
- Augmented renal clearance, a pharmacokinetic consideration in critically ill persons

=== Computing ===
==== Hardware ====
- ARC (processor), a family of embedded microprocessors
- Intel Arc, a brand of graphics processing units designed by Intel
- Audio Return Channel, a feature of HDMI 1.4
- Automatic Relay Computer, an early electromechanical computer

==== Other uses in computing ====
- Adaptive replacement cache, a cache management algorithm
- Advanced Resource Connector, middleware for computational grids
- Advanced RISC Computing, a specification
- Google App Runtime for Chrome, a compatibility layer and sandboxing technology to run Android applications on Chromebook computers
- ARC (file format), a lossless data compression and archival file format
- ARC-AGI, Abstraction and Reasoning Corpus for Artificial General Intelligence
- ARC Macro Language, a high-level algorithmic language
- Authenticated Received Chain, an email authentication system
- Automatic Reference Counting, an Objective-C and Swift memory management feature
- Arc (web browser), a chromium based web browser "reimagination" released in 2022 with a focus on modern design

=== Research organizations ===
- Agricultural Research Council, a former British organisation that funded agricultural research
- Alberta Research Council, a government-funded applied R&D corporation
- Alignment Research Center, an AI alignment research organization
- American Rocketry Challenge, an American model rocketry competition for high school students
- Ames Research Center, a NASA facility located at Moffett Federal Airfield, California
- Arthritis Research Campaign, a British medical research charity
- Astrophysical Research Consortium, the organization that operates the Apache Point Observatory
- Augmentation Research Center, a center founded by electrical engineer Douglas Engelbart
- Australian Research Council, the Australian Government's main research funding body for tertiary institutions
- Aviation Research Centre, a part of the Research and Analysis Wing (R&AW) of the Cabinet Secretariat, India

=== Other uses in science and technology ===
- ARC fusion reactor, Affordable, Robust Compact reactor, a reactor design from MIT
- Agulhas Return Current, an ocean current in the Indian Ocean
- Archaeological Review from Cambridge, a UK journal
- Archival Research Catalog, a National Archives and Records Administration catalog
- Automation and Remote Control, a Russian periodical

== Schools ==
- Academy of Richmond County, Augusta, Georgia, US
- American River College, Sacramento County, California, US
- Army Reconnaissance Course, US Army Armor School, Fort Knox, Kentucky

== Sports ==
=== Clubs ===
- Adelaide Rowing Club, in Adelaide, South Australia
- SV ARC (Alphense Racing Club), Alphen aan den Rijn, Netherlands, a Dutch football club
- Atlanta Rowing Club, Roswell, Georgia

=== Competitions and conferences ===
- African Rally Championship, international automobile rally
- American Rivers Conference, an NCAA Division III athletic conference operating mainly in Iowa with one member in Nebraska
- Americas Rugby Championship
- Atlantic Rally for Cruisers, a transatlantic sailing competition
- Australian Rally Championship
- Australian Rugby Championship (August–October 2007), rugby union
- Archery at the Summer Olympics (IOC code ARC)

=== Facilities ===
- Anteater Recreation Center, an indoor gym at the University of California, Irvine
- Athletics–Recreation Center, a 5,000-seat multi-purpose arena on the campus of Valparaiso University in Valparaiso, Indiana

=== Other organizations ===
- Arena Racing Company, a British racecourse owning group

== Transportation ==
- ARC Europe, an association of motoring clubs
- Access to the Region's Core, a cancelled commuter rail project, New York, US
- Anaheim Rapid Connection, a proposed streetcar line

== Other uses ==
- Activity relationship chart, of closeness between activities
- Alarm monitoring center, also known as alarm receiving center (ARC)
- Anti-reflective coating
- ARC triangle, Affinity, Reality and Communication, in Scientology
- Aramaic language (ISO 639-2 code "arc")
  - Aramaic Wikipedia, which uses "arc" as its url prefix
- ARC West Michigan, an independent digital subchannel of WWMT in Kalamazoo, Michigan
- American Rocketry Challenge, an American model rocketry competition for high school students

== See also ==
- Alpha Rho Chi (αρχ), U.S. architect fraternity
- Arch (disambiguation)
- ARCS (disambiguation)
- Ark (disambiguation)
- ARQ (disambiguation)
