= Arcs =

Arcs may refer to:

- Arcs (board game), a 2024 board game
- Arcsecond (abbreviated as arcs)
- Archaeosine synthase, an enzyme
- The Arcs, an American garage rock band formed by Dan Auerbach in 2015
- Les Arcs, a ski resort in the French Alps
- Les Arcs, Var, a town in southern France

== See also ==
- Arc (disambiguation)
- ARCS (disambiguation)
- Arx (disambiguation)
