= Berra (disambiguation) =

Berra is a comune (municipality) in the Province of Ferrara, Emilia-Romagna, Italy.

Berra may also refer to:

- Berra (surname)
- La Berra, a mountain of the Alps, Switzerland

== See also ==
- Bera (disambiguation)
