= Abell 1068 BCG =

Type-cD galaxy in the constellation Ursa Major

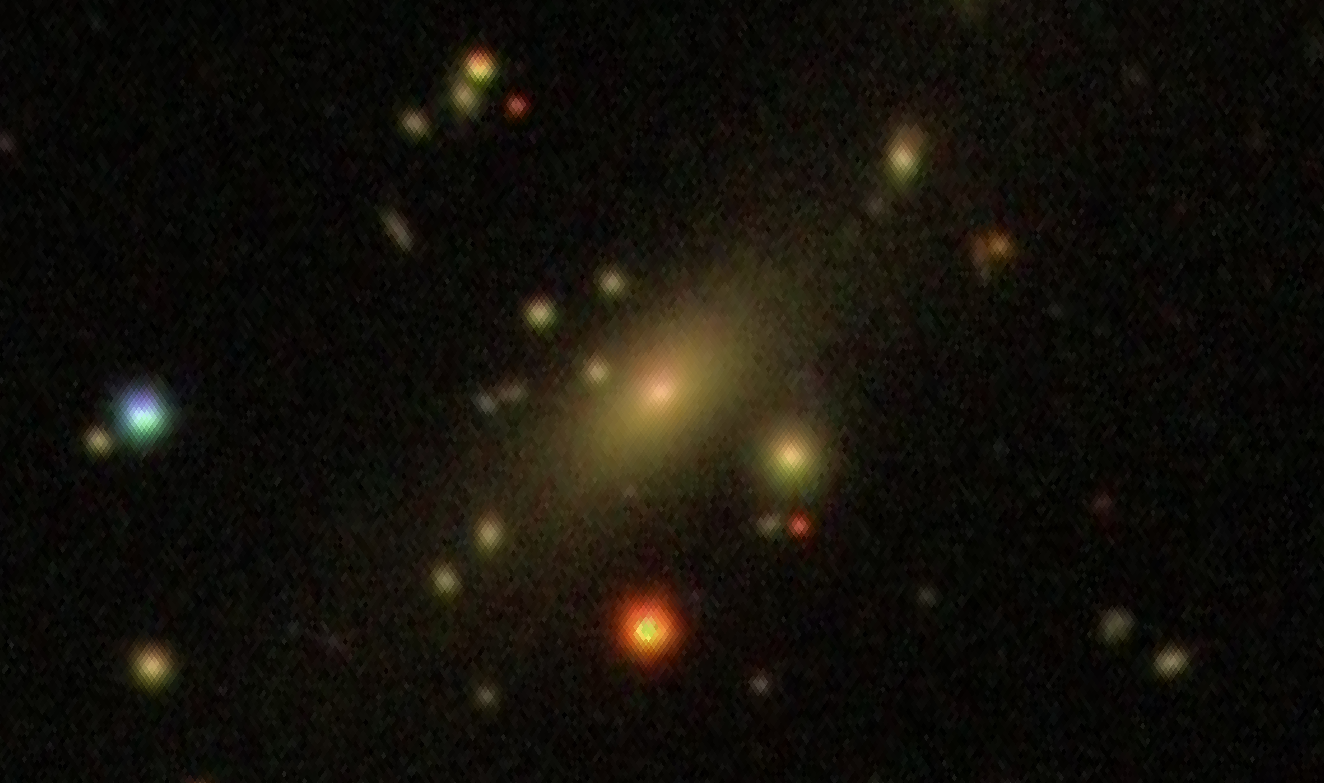
- SDSS image of Abell 1068 BCG

Observation data (J2000.0 epoch)
- Constellation: Ursa Major
- Right ascension: 10^{h} 40^{m} 44.50^{s}
- Declination: +39° 57′ 11.27″
- Redshift: 0.138391
- Heliocentric radial velocity: 41,489 km/s ± 21
- Distance: 2.006 Gly (615.23 Mpc)
- Group or cluster: Abell 1068
- Apparent magnitude (V): 18.14

Characteristics
- Type: cD Sy2
- Size: ~607,000 ly (186.0 kpc) (estimated)

Other designations
- ABELL 1068:[HDH2012] BCG, IRAS F10378+4012, LEDA 93944, SDSS J104044.50+395711.3

Abell 1068 BCG (short for Abell 1068 Brightest Cluster Galaxy) is a massive type-cD galaxy located in the constellation of Ursa Major. The redshift of the galaxy is (z) 0.138 and it was first discovered in the IRAS Faint Catalogue survey in 1990. It is the brightest cluster galaxy in the galaxy cluster Abell 1068, with an integrated total luminosity of 0.46 × 10^{31} erg s^{−1} Hz^{−1}. It is also classified as a fossil galaxy.

== Description ==
Abell 1068 BCG is classified as a central dominant galaxy lying in the center of the galaxy cluster Abell 1068. It is known to display a central blue nucleus and has a surface brightness profile that is found to increase above the half magnitude of the R^{1/4} profile with the measured of 81 kiloparsecs and a measured surface brightness of around 25 magnitude. The halo of the galaxy has presence of several blue structures projected into it. There is also an arc-like feature present that is shown to have a bridge connecting to its nucleus. A wisp feature is found to have a curved shape towards the southwest direction of a luminous galaxy. It is also classified as a starburst galaxy, with stars forming at a continuous rate at between 20 and 70 M_{☉} per year during the past 100 million years. This is expected to continue for at least one billion years given the presence of a central reservoir of gas with a mass of 4 × 10^{10} M_{☉}. Red supergiant stars may be present in the galaxy based on detections of calcium ion triplets in its spectrum. Evidence also found there is also a secondary starburst that occurred in southeast direction from the core region. The radio source of Abell 1068 BCG is found to be compact based on radio mapping made by Very Large Array (VLA).

The supermassive black hole located inside the center of the galaxy is estimated to be around 1.0^{+0.6}_{−0.4} × 10^{9} M_{☉} based on the adjustment of its value by the factor of 0.35. The Eddington rate of the black hole is estimated to be 1.6^{+1.0}_{−0.6} × 10^{−4} M_{edd} based on its black hole measurement from a 2006 study. In 2011, the infrared spectroscopy spectrum of the galaxy was found to have a red continuum with traces of weak emission features. The total infrared luminosity of the galaxy at 24 ɥm is estimated to be 582 × 10^{42} erg s^{−1}.

A study published in 2009, has found presence of radio emission that is associated with Abell 1068 BCG. When observed, the emission is shown to have a measured flux density of 8.5 ± 0.6 mJy and has an extension towards the northwest direction. An emission-line nebula is found to surround the galaxy and is known to emit out strong detections of doubly ionized oxygen emission. There are also presence of weak features of Wolf-Raynet stars suggesting the ionization of the nebula is powered through starbursts.
