= Carlos Jarque =

Mexican economist (born 1954)

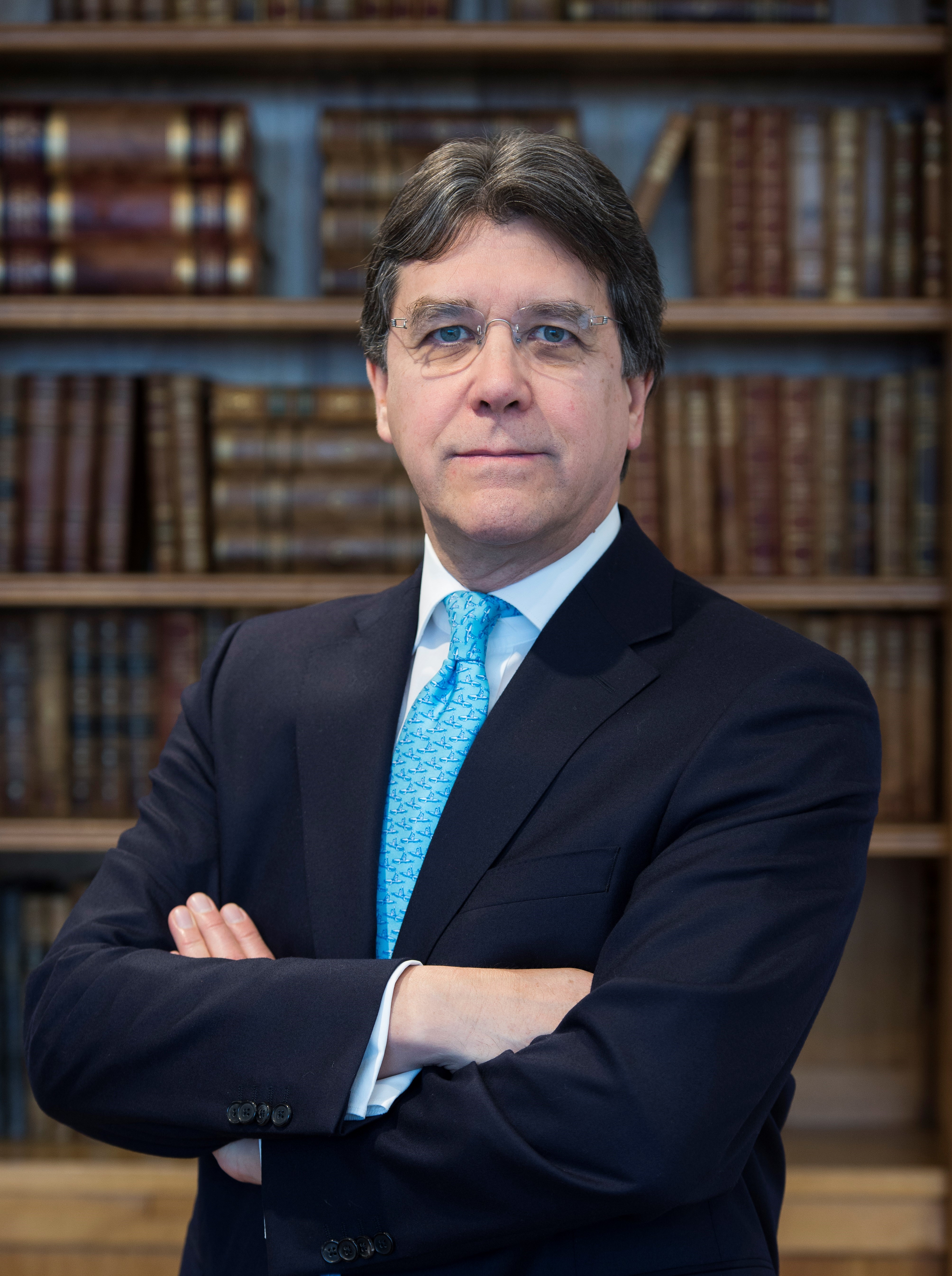
Carlos M. Jarque Uribe

Carlos M. Jarque Uribe (born October 18, 1954 in Mexico City) is a Mexican economist, currently Executive Director of América Móvil and Board Member of the Leading Global Group in Citizen Services FCC (Fomento de Construcciones y Contratas). He has had a distinguished career in the private sector, in public service (national and multilateral) and in the academic world.

== Education ==
Jarque has a degree in Actuarial Sciences from Anahuac University in México City. He has a Postgraduate Diploma in Statistics and a Masters in Econometrics M.Sc. from the London School of Economics; Postgraduate Certificate in Economic Policy and Urban and Regional Planning at the University of Oslo; Doctorate in Economics (Ph. D) from the Australian National University; and a Postdoctoral in Economics from Harvard University.

== Publications and research ==
Jarque has published over 130 articles and has provided prefaces for 44 books. He is well known for his work in model specification tests (including the Jarque–Bera test statistic), and for his methods on optimum stratification. His research on Consumption and Saving Patterns using Limited Dependent Variable Models, have been pioneering ... his Quarterly Econometric Model with Rational Expectations (with P. Aspe) allowed to efficiently forecast economic cycles ... and his work on Cluster Analysis has ample use in the elaboration of Atlases of Wellbeing and Development.

His econometric tests for Normality, Homoscedasticity, Serial Independence and Specification of Models are in textbooks, are taught in multiple university careers and they are incorporated in many computer programs. This allows for better studies of causality in economics and in the social sciences. Many generations of researchers around the world have been trained on the use of these econometric procedures.

He has also written about economic and social policies and strategies, and about the Diplomacy of the Summits of Heads of State. He has taught at the Faculty of Economics of the Australian National University, and has been a visiting scholar at Harvard University teaching in its Doctorate program in Economics.

== Career ==
=== Mexican civil service ===
Jarque began his career in business administration as manager of economic studies of the Mexican Telephone Corporation in 1982, in charge of planning and economic and financial scenarios. He was then Chief Statistician of Mexico responsible for the direction of the economic and social statistical information systems of the country.

For almost eleven years, Jarque was president of the National Institute of Statistics, Geography and Informatics (INEGI) of Mexico, the autonomous government entity charged with integration of the information system of Mexico. During his tenure, he directed the design and implementation of a vast program that modernized the National Geographic and Statistical Information System, making it one of the most advanced in the world, to support, among other tasks, the fight against poverty, economic and social development, urban and regional planning, and the infrastructure programs of the country. He coordinated eight national censuses (economic, agricultural, population and housing) hiring more than one million people for the task. Carlos M. Jarque also directed short term statistics (GDP, trade balance, inequality, productivity, unemployment, investment, etc.) and information on the environment, also, a pioneering project worldwide, the ecological GDP of Mexico. He also directed an unprecedented Land Titling Program, elaborating a detailed cadaster at parcel level, in order to assign in ownership (title in property) half of the territory of Mexico (102 million hectares) to poor people. He was the Y2K coordinator for the computer conversion of Mexico and responsible for the First Informatics Development Program in Mexico.

He was president of the Inter-Ministerial Committee of Information for Monitoring Public Finances, established with vice ministers of the Treasury, Programming and the Budget, Comptroller´s Office and the Central Bank, to lower the public sector deficit which was extremely high in relation to GDP. He was secretary of the National Development Plan of Mexico for the period 1995–2000, made through a broad public consultation and which constituted the Government Program of President Ernesto Zedillo.

He also held the position of Minister of Social Development (SEDESOL), where he remained until the end of the Government in December 2000. In this position he directed a wide range of social programs (including those for poverty alleviation) and the initiatives for housing, microcredit, urban and regional development and territorial planning, managing budget lines of support to States and Municipalities. In this position he also coordinated the response to the catastrophic effects of natural disasters. He attended plenary sessions of the Congress of the Union (Chamber of Deputies and Chamber of Senators) for hearings on the social policy of the Government of the Republic.

=== Business and banking ===
He was director of the Sustainable Development Department (2001–2005), of the Inter-American Development Bank (IDB), the main multilateral source of financing for development in Latin America and the Caribbean (LAC). In this position, he was responsible for the definition of sectoral policies and development strategies of the IDB.

He was secretary of the IDB (2005–2007), in charge of the institutional governance of the Bank and of the relationship with the Board of Governors (Ministers of Finance, Economy and Development of the 48 member countries of the IDB). As secretary he oversaw the approval of all operations of the IDB, including 11 billion dollars a year in loans, the 70% increase in the Bank's capital, and its realignment and restructuring program. He supported, through the Secretariat, the debt relief program HIPC of the most indebted poor countries (4,400 million dollars) directly benefiting more than 30 million people in what was possibly one of the main acts of international solidarity towards the highly indebted and poorest countries of LAC (Bolivia, Haiti, Honduras, Guyana and Nicaragua). At the IDB Group, he was also Secretary of the Inter-American Investment Corporation and Secretary of the Multilateral Investment Fund, an innovation laboratory for development.

From 2008 to March 2013, he was IDB Representative in Europe and Principal Adviser to the President, promoting, among other tasks, the investment and mobilization of resources between Europe and LAC, mainly in the areas of water, energy, infrastructure, urban development, transport and sustainable cities. During his tenure and with an efficient team, the development cooperation resources mobilized from Europe to the Latin American and Caribbean region through the IDB were multiplied by a factor of 20. During his 12 years at the Bank he was Sherpa of the IDB for the Summits of Heads of State, and attended the Summits of the Americas, CELAC, European Union-LAC, Ibero-American, Alliance of the Pacific and APEC Summits. He established the Permanent Secretariat of the European Union-LAC Business Summits and the IDB Office for Europe in Madrid, inaugurated by the President of Spain.

From April 2013 to August 2015, he was executive director at America Movil, in charge of corporate, government and international relations, supporting the interaction with the governments, international agencies and the relationship with the CEOs of the countries.

From August 2015 to September 2017 he was first executive and CEO of the FCC Group with global headquarters in Madrid, Spain. FCC is the parent company of one of the first and most important global Citizen Services groups that contributes to the welfare and sustainable progress of society. FCC is present in the environmental services sector, integrated water management and in infrastructure, with more than 115 years of history. It has activities in 35 countries, where it employs more than 60,000 people and provides daily services to 130 million people.

== Organisation affiliations ==
Jarque has been the only non-European to hold the position of director of the International Statistical Institute (ISI, World Statistical Academy) with headquarters in The Netherlands.

Jarque has been president of the United Nations Statistical Commission, a global authority for the definition, approval and implementation of Methodologies to measure the economic phenomena (GDP, trade balance, capital account) and the social spheres (poverty, migration, education, employment, mortality). He participated in the definition, measurement and follow up of the Millennium Development Goals of the UN, human development objectives adopted by 189 countries. He has held the position of secretary and director of the Bernoulli Society for Mathematical Statistics and Probability; International Association for Statistical Education; International Association for Statistical Computing; International Association for Rural and Urban Statistics; International Association of Survey Statisticians; and the International Association for Official Statistics. Since September 13, 2017, Jarque is a member of the board of FCC, Realia and Cementos Portland and member of the board of the Telekom Austria Group.

He is a member of the Broadband Commission, created at the initiative of the secretary general of the UN, made up of the presidents of the main telecommunications companies, telecommunications ministers, regulators, academics and representatives of civil society. The Secretariat is exercised by the secretary general of the International Telecommunication Union and the director general of UNESCO. He has also been a member of the “Consejo Superior” of the Network of Anahuac Universities, and of the board of directors of the National Institute of Public Administration of Mexico. He has been a member of the Intersecretarial Expenditure – Financing Commission, National Commission of Foreign Investments, Commission for Cooperation of Productive Sectors, Council of the National Indigenous Institute and of the National Fund of Social Enterprises. Since 2012 he has participated in the World Economic Forum and is a member of the Advisory Council BIAC of the OECD.

== Awards ==
He has received the Honoris Causa Doctorate from Anahuac University; the Adolphe Quetelet Medal from the World Academy of Statisticians; the Henri Willem Methorst Medal; the Benito Juárez Medal (given by the president of Mexico); the Mahalanobis Prize (world distinction in the field of Statistics); Prize "Ricardo Flores Magón" for support to Freedom of the Press and of Expression; Prize 2017 Master of GOLD of the Royal Forum of Top Business Executives (forum that includes high executives of Ibero America, President of Honor King D. Juan Carlos I of Spain).

== See also ==
- Fomento de Construcciones y Contratas
- Inter-American Development Bank
- Jarque–Bera test, a statistical test named after Carlos Jarque and Anil K. Bera
