= Bera =

Bera may refer to:

== Acronyms ==
- Bioelectric recognition assay, a method in electrophysiology
- Botswana Energy Regulatory Authority, an energy regulatory body in Botswana
- Brainstem evoked response audiometry, a screening test to monitor for hearing loss or deafness
- Branford Electric Railway Association, a non-profit historical and educational institution in East Haven, Connecticut
- British Educational Research Association, a British education research organisation

== People ==
=== Historical ===
- Bera (king), king of Sodom in Genesis 14
- Bera, Count of Barcelona (died 844), the first count of Barcelona

=== Given name ===
- Bera Ivanishvili (born 1994), Georgian musician and entrepreneur

=== Surname ===
- Bera (surname)

== Places ==
- Bera (biblical place), mentioned in the Book of Judges in the Hebrew Bible
- Bera, Iran, a village in Kohgiluyeh and Boyer-Ahmad Province, Iran
- Bera, Mathura, a village in Naujhil Block, Mant Tahsil of Mathura district at Uttar Pradesh in India
- Bera, Navarre, a town and municipality in Navarre, northern Spain
- Bera Bach, an 807-metre mountain in north Wales
- Bera District, a district and town in Pahang, Malaysia
  - Bera (federal constituency), in Bera District, Pahang, Malaysia
- Bera Lake, natural freshwater lake system, located in Bera District, Pahang, Malaysia
- Bera Mawr, a 794-metre mountain in north Wales
- Bera Upazila, in Pabna District, Rajshahi Division, Bangladesh
- Arc de Berà (sometimes written Barà), a triumphal arch north-east of the city of Tarragona, Catalonia, Spain
- Tower of Bera, remains of a medieval watchtower located in the civil parish of Almalaguês, in the municipality of Coimbra, Portuguese Coimbra

== Sports ==
- Bera Bera RT, Spanish rugby union club
- BM Bera Bera, Spanish women's handball club from San Sebastián

== Other ==
- Bera (font), a family of typefaces
- Bera Holding, a Turkish group of companies

== See also ==
- Berra (disambiguation)
