= United Response =

Mental health organisation in the United Kingdom

- Formation: 1973
- Type: Non-profit
- Legal status: Charity
- Headquarters: London
- Region served: England and Wales
- Chief executive: Kate Terroni
- Website: www.unitedresponse.org.uk

United Response is a charity operating in England and Wales, providing a range of support and services for around 2,000 people with learning disabilities, mental health needs, or physical disabilities.

== History ==
United Response was founded in 1973 by Su Sayer, CBE. She opened the first service in Tillington, West Sussex. By 1979, it was the region's largest provider of support for people with learning disabilities. In 1983, United Response expanded to the north of England, setting up its first service in Chesterfield. In 1990, the charity started working with people with mental health needs.

Seven years later, it began implementing person-centered active support under the guidance of the late Professor Jim Mansell, CBE, who joined the board of trustees in 1995. In 1999, United Response launched the first of many social enterprises, a cleaning company under its trading arm, UR in Business. The company employed people with learning disabilities. In 2002 the charity began working with the University of Kent’s Tizard Centre to study, monitor and evaluate the quality of its support.

In 2006, United Response ran a project entitled Mental Wealth to raise awareness of issues facing people with mental health needs. In 2008 the charity launched Making Money Easier – resources to support people with learning disabilities access banks and manage their money.

In 2013, United Response launched Easy News, the first accessible news magazine for people with learning disabilities. In 2018, United Response began its Disability Hate Crime campaign. In 2021, United Response launched an annual Accessible Voting Day. And in 2023, United Response launched My Vote My Voice, a joint campaign with Dimensions, Ambitious About Autism and Mencap, encouraging more people with learning disabilities to vote.

== Services ==
United Response provides 24-hour support for people with profound physical needs or just a few hours for those who need less support to live their lives.

Job coaches support people into meaningful paid employment. United Response can provide outreach support for those with mental health needs or help people who find it difficult to communicate by making information more accessible.

They have also active support and positive behaviour support as ways of involving people with even the most complex needs and challenging behaviour in all areas of their lives.

== Campaigns ==
In support of the organisation's vision, United Response also campaign to improve the lives of people with disabilities in society. This may mean lobbying decision makers such as Members of Parliament to ensure that people's voices are heard or it might mean working directly with disabled people so that they can be more directly engaged in the democratic process.

United Response also works with employers to ensure that more people with learning disabilities, mental health needs, and physical disabilities get a fair opportunity to work.

=== Accessible voting ===
Since 2010, United Response have campaigned to make politics easier to understand for the 1.5 million people with learning disabilities in the UK. But people are still effectively excluded from exercising their vote. Take the pledge for accessible voting for all.

=== Disability hate crime ===
Disability hate crime can have a devastating impact on people’s lives. United Response call for the criminal justice system to be more accessible for people with learning disabilities, mental health support needs, and neurodiversity.

=== Campaigns Panel reports ===
United Response’s Campaigns Panel is an informal network made up of around 20 people it supports with disabilities around the country, plus some family members.

The panel volunteers their time to ensure the charity’s campaigning is focused on the issues that matter most to the people it supports.

Over the past five years, United Response has published reports on issues important to the Campaigns Panel, such as what good care looks like, what the government should be doing to support disabled people and the legacy of the 2013 Paralympic Games.

== Resources ==
United Response produces a wealth of resources, many aimed specifically at people with learning disabilities.

=== Easy read documents and Easy News ===
The charity is experienced in producing ‘easy read’ documents, which use simple words supported by pictures to aid understanding. Producing these documents is part of its commitment to accessibility and to promoting the equality of people with learning disabilities.

Its most well-known resource is Easy News, the first news magazine designed to be accessible for people with learning disabilities, who often find politics and the news difficult to follow due to the use of jargon and complex language. Easy News uses simplified text and pictures to provide people with learning disabilities with easy-to-understand, politically neutral summaries of key news stories and events.

United Response also employs groups of people with learning disabilities and autism, known as UR Consultants, who are experts in easy read communication, to select and translate the stories within Easy News, and provide consultancy services to businesses throughout the UK.

Other easy-read documents by the charity include Making Money Easier, its guide to all things money and finance-related, and its resources on politics and voting to accompany its accessible voting campaign.

=== Best practice resources ===
United Response also shares its best practice resources with other professionals in the social care sector. These span topics such as person-centred planning techniques, active support, positive behaviour support, and community engagement.

== Fundraising ==
United Response fundraises for their local community-based services, runs national appeals and raises money through various social enterprises staffed by people they support with disabilities.

== Awards ==
In 2008, United Response was shortlisted as the best employer in the Third Sector Excellence Awards and highly commended for their Annual Report. They also won a highly prestigious National Training Award for the investment they make in their staff.

United Response’s Easy News (the first easy read news magazine for people with learning disabilities) received a Charity Award 2014 for Education and Training. Later that same year, its creative Postcards from the Edges project won Best Use of the Web at the Charity Times Awards 2014, where it was also Highly Commended in the Charity of the Year category.

== Notable patrons ==
Martyn Lewis, CBE is president of United Response and was appointed a CBE in 1997 for his services to young people and the hospice movement.

TV presenter and former sports commentator Steve Rider is a Vice President of United Response.

The charity’s founder, Su Sayer, CBE, stepped down after 40 years as CEO in March 2014. She was appointed a CBE in 2013 for her services to people with disabilities in the UK.

== See also ==
- Learning Disability Coalition
