= Mencap =

British charity advocating for people with learning disabilities

- Mencap logo
- Formation: 1946
- Type: Charity
- Registration no.: 222377
- Headquarters: London, EC1
- Region served: United Kingdom
- Chief Executive: Jon Sparkes
- Website: www.mencap.org.uk

The Royal Mencap Society is a charity based in the United Kingdom that works with people with learning disabilities.

== History ==
Established by Judy Fryd in 1946 as The National Association of Parents of Backwards Children, the organisation changed its name to The National Society for Mentally Handicapped Children in 1955, becoming The Royal Society for Mentally Handicapped Children and Adults following patronage from Queen Elizabeth the Queen Mother and Elizabeth II in 1981.

Fryd had written to Nursery World magazine inviting other parents to contact her. Many wrote back expressing their anger and sorrow at the lack of services for their children.

Since 1969 the Society has been commonly known by the abbreviation "Mencap" and, in 2002, its full legal name was shortened to the Royal Mencap Society.

In 1955, the Society opened its first project, the Orchard Dene short-stay residential home. In 1958, it launched a ground-breaking project called the Brookland's Experiment. This compared the progress of children with a learning disability who lived in a hospital with a group of children who were moved to a small family environment and cared for using educational activities modelled on those in "ordinary" nurseries. After two years, the children in the home-like environment showed marked improvements in social, emotional and verbal skills. The success of the experiment was published around the world.

Mencap also provides help and support through supported living, supported employment, respite services, organized activities, systemic and individual advocacy, and outreach support. It has an individual membership organization with a local network of more than 450 affiliated groups. Mencap's work is membership-driven, and thanks to its work for the welfare of young people, it is a member of The National Council for Voluntary Youth Services (NCVYS).

== Coalitions ==
Mencap, along with 14 other organisations, is a member of the Learning Disability Coalition. The Coalition was formed in May 2007 to campaign for better funding for social care for people with a learning disability in England.

Mencap partnered with ENABLE Scotland in a special 'sister charity' relationship to help support people with learning disabilities in Scotland.

Mencap is a member of the Disability Charities Consortium (DCC), which brings together leaders from the UK's leading not-for-profit disability organisations to work with the Government to make sure disabled people's experiences are reflected in UK policy making.

== Management ==
Since 1998, at least one-third of the members of the National Assembly must be people with a learning disability.

From 1980 the actor Brian Rix represented the charity in a number of positions, including Secretary-General, Chairman and finally President. Until October 2019, the chief executive of Mencap was Jan Tregelles, succeeding Mark Goldring in March 2013. Tregelles first worked at Mencap in 1983 as PA to one of the then directors. She has held various posts across Mencap; she has been the director of personal support since 2002 and has grown the business from £80 million turnover to £180 million in that time. In the summer of 2019, Tregelles announced that she would be leaving Mencap. She was succeeded by Edel Harris in October 2019.

In March 2022, the charity announced the appointment of Dame Carolyn Fairbairn as its new Chair, replacing Derek Lewis after his eight-year term.

In July 2023, Edel Harris announced she was stepping down as CEO. Jackie O'Sullivan, previously Mencap's Executive Director of Communication, Advocacy & Activism was installed as interim CEO.

In January 2024, Mencap announced Jon Sparkes OBE, formally CEO of UNICEF UK would be installed as CEO in June 2024.

== Supporters and ambassadors ==
In 1986, Queen Elizabeth the Queen Mother became the patron of Mencap and in 2004 the Countess of Wessex, later Duchess of Edinburgh, became Mencap's patron.
