= Arc =

Arc may refer to:

== Mathematics ==
- Arc (geometry), a segment of a differentiable curve
  - Circular arc, a segment of a circle
- Arc (topology), a segment of a path
- Arc length, the distance between two points along a section of a curve
- Arc (projective geometry), a particular type of set of points of a projective plane
- arc (function prefix) (arcus), a prefix for inverse trigonometric functions
- Directed arc, a directed edge in graph theory
- Minute and second of arc, a unit of angular measurement equal to 1/60 of one degree.
- Wild arc, a concept from geometric topology

== Science and technology ==
=== Geology ===
- Arc, in geology a mountain chain configured as an arc due to a common orogeny along a plate margin or the effect of back-arc extension
  - Hellenic arc, the arc of islands positioned over the Hellenic Trench in the Aegean Sea off Greece
- Back-arc basin, a subsided region caused by back-arc extension
- Back-arc region, the region created by back-arc extension, containing all the basins, faults, and volcanoes generated by the extension
- Island arc, an arc-shaped archipelago, usually so configured for geologic causes, such as sea-floor spreading, common orogeny on the margin of the same plate, or back-arc extension
  - Northeastern Japan Arc, an island arc
  - Banda Arc, a set of island arcs in Indonesia
- Continental arc, in geology a continental mountain chain or parallel alignment of chains (as opposed to island arcs), configured in an arc
  - Eastern Arc Mountains, a continental arc of Africa
- Volcanic arc, a chain of volcanoes positioned in an arc shape as seen from above
  - Aleutian Arc, a large volcanic arc in the U.S. state of Alaska
- Nastapoka arc, a circular coastline in Hudson Bay

=== Technology ===
- arc, the command-line interface for ArcInfo
- ARC (file format), a file name extension for archive files
- ARC (processor), 32-bit RISC architecture
- Adaptive Replacement Cache, a page replacement algorithm for high-performance filesystems
- Automatic Reference Counting, the Clang compiler's implementation of reference counting
- Arc (programming language), a Lisp dialect designed by Paul Graham
- Arc (web browser), a freeware web browser developed by The Browser Company
- Sony Ericsson Xperia Arc, a cellphone
- Audio Return Channel, an audio technology working over HDMI
- Authenticated Received Chain, an email authentication system
- Arc lamp, a lamp that produces light by an electric arc
  - Xenon arc lamp, a highly specialized type of gas discharge lamp
  - Deuterium arc lamp, a low-pressure gas-discharge light source
  - Hydrargyrum medium-arc iodide lamp, the trademark name of Osram's brand of metal-halide gas discharge medium arc-length lamp
- Electric arc furnace, a furnace that heats charged material by means of an electric arc
- Arc welding, a welding process that is used to join metal to metal
- Arc-fault circuit interrupter, a specialized circuit breaker
- Arc converter, a spark transmitter
- Intel Arc, brand of graphics processing units designed by Intel
- Arc, one side (half) of an arch

=== Other science and technology ===
- Electric arc, an ongoing plasma discharge (an electric current through a gas), producing light and heat
- Arc flash, the light and heat produced as part of an arc fault
- Arc (protein), a name of product of an immediate early gene, also called Arg3.1
- Reflex arc, a neural pathway that controls a reflex
- Circumhorizontal arc, an optical phenomenon
- Circumzenithal arc, an optical phenomenon

== Arts and entertainment ==
=== Music ===
- A.R.C. (album), by pianist Chick Corea with bassist David Holland and drummer Barry Altschul recorded in 1971
- Arc (Neil Young & Crazy Horse album), 1991
- Arc (Everything Everything album), 2013
- Arc (EP), a 2016 EP by Agoraphobic Nosebleed
- "Arc", a song by Pearl Jam from Riot Act

=== Video games ===
- Arc System Works, a video game developer
- Luminous Arc, a video game series
- The title character of Arc the Lad, a series of role-playing video games for the PlayStation and PlayStation 2

=== Other arts and entertainment ===
- Tilted Arc, a controversial public art installation by Richard Serra
- Arc Poetry Magazine, a Canadian literary journal
- Character arc, the status of a character as it unfolds throughout the story
- Story arc, an extended or continuing storyline
- Arcs, one of the twelve basic principles of animation
- Ultraman Arc, a 2024 Japanese television series produced by Tsubuyara Productions and TV Tokyo

== Codes ==
- Arcata Transit Center, Amtrak code for the station in Arcata, California
- IATA airport code of Arctic Village Airport, a public use airport in Alaska
- ISO 639-3 language code of the Official Aramaic language, spoken between 700 BCE and 300 BCE

== Companies and organizations ==
- Arc Infrastructure, an Australian railway company
- Arc Institute, an American biomedical research organization
- Arc International, a French manufacturer and distributor of household goods
- Arc Publications, a UK independent publisher of poetry
- Arc @ UNSW, the principal student organisation at the University of New South Wales
- Arc of the United States, a charitable organization serving people with intellectual and developmental disabilities
- Arc Holdings, a French manufacturer of household goods

== Places ==
- Arc (Provence), a river of southern France, flowing into the Étang de Berre
- Arc (Savoie), a river of eastern France, tributary of the Isère river
- Arc, short for "Arcade"; a Street suffix as used in the US

== Sports ==
- American Rivers Conference (abbreviation officially rendered as "A-R-C"), an NCAA Division III athletic conference
- Arc (greyhounds), a major greyhound race in the Greyhound Board of Great Britain calendar
- Prix de l'Arc de Triomphe, a horse race in Paris

== Other uses ==
- Arc (Bahá'í), a number of administrative buildings for the Bahá'í Faith, located on Mount Carmel in Israel

== See also ==
- Joan of Arc (c. 1412–1431), national heroine of France and Catholic saint
- ARC (disambiguation)
- Arcs (disambiguation)
- Arc Angel (disambiguation)
- Arc reactor (disambiguation)
- Arch (disambiguation)
- Arch of Triumph (disambiguation)
- Ark (disambiguation)
- ARQ (disambiguation)
