= Nadia Huggins =

Trinidadian photographer

- Born: January 28, 1984 (age 42); Port of Spain, Trinidad and Tobago
- Occupation: Photographer

Nadia Huggins was born in 1984 in Port of Spain, Trinidad and Tobago. She now resides in Saint Vincent and the Grenadines. Nadia Huggins is a self-taught photographer and graphic designer who has worked extensively throughout the Caribbean. She was awarded the Festival Caribbeen de L'image du Mémorial Acte Jury Prize in Guadeloupe in 2015.

== Early life and interests ==
Growing up in Saint Vincent & the Grenadines, Nadia Huggins was raised just a short walk from a beach. During her adolescent years, she enjoyed climbing and jumping off rocks with "the boys" she became friends with. She soon developed an interest in photography and bought her first camera.

Huggins, became interested in photographing people and their experiences around the Caribbean. Her passion lies in capturing images in the sea, which allows her to see the beauty of not only by what can be seen above the surface, but also what you cannot see below. Nadia has learned to overcome her fear of the water by photographing herself inside in the water. She compares objects such as sea urchins and underwater flora to her own body's texture and parts.

== Career and work ==
Nadia Huggins co-founded ARC Magazine in 2011. ARC's mission is to expand creative culture, within the visual arts industry across the wider Caribbean and its diasporas.

Huggins, has most recently worked on Fighting the Currents project, which focuses on bodies underwater. Nadia, uses her own body, the ocean, and marine organisms to compare the similarities within. Huggins states, "Most people's experience with the sea occurs at eye level with the horizon and they are oblivious to what is happening below the surface. I am interested in the notion that 'just because you can't see something doesn't mean it isn't there."

== Exhibitions ==
- 2011 – About Change, The World Bank Group Washington DC, US
- 2014 – 2014 Frames: Projecting International Photography, Glasgow, Scotland, UK
- 2014 – (e)merge Art Fair: ARC + NLS collaboration, Washington DC
- 2015 – Fighting the currents single piece installation, Alice Yard AY24/7, Port of Spain, Trinidad & Tobago
- 2016 – Featured artist for Third Horizon Caribbean Film Festival, Miami, US(2016) Embodied Islands: A Caribbean photographic exhibition, University of Warwick, Coventry, UK
- 2016 – Small Axe Caribbean Queer Visualities, Outburst Queer Arts Festival, Golden Thread Gallery, Belfast, Northern Ireland, UK
- 2016 – Vision Archipéliques, Fondation Clément, Martinique
- 2017 – Fighting the Currents, Centro de la Imagen, Santo Domingo, Dominican Republic
- 2017 – Jamaica Biennial 2017, National Gallery of Jamaica, Kingston, Jamaica
- 2017 – Small Axe: Caribbean Queer Visualities, Transmission Gallery, Glasgow, Scotland, UK
- 2018 – Arrivants: Art and Migration in the Anglophone Caribbean World, Barbados Museum, Barbados
- 2018 – Bodies of water, material detritus, and reclamation of used things and objects, Tempsspace, Montréal, Canada
- 2018 – Relational Undercurrents: Contemporary Art of the Caribbean Archipelago, Sugar Hill Children’s Museum of Art & Storytelling, New York, US
- 2018 – Caribbean Women Photographers and the Body Within Caribbean Landscapes and Seascapes, Addis Foto Fest 2018, Addis Ababa, Ethiopia
- 2019 – Relational Undercurrents: Contemporary Art of the Caribbean Archipelago, Portland Museum of Art, Portland, Maine, US
- 2019 – A Love Ethic, Wedge Curatorial Projects, Gladstone Hotel, Toronto, Canada

== Awards ==
- 2015 – Festival Caribeen de L'image du Mémorial Acte – 2015 Jury Prize. Category: Photographer. Awarded by La Région Guadeloupe.

== Residencies ==
- 2017 – Once upon a water, Pico Island, the Azores
