= ARQ (journal) =

- Discipline: Architecture
- Language: Spanish
- Edited by: Patricio Mardones Hiche

Publication details
- History: 1980–present
- Publisher: Pontifical Catholic University of Chile (Chile)
- Frequency: Quarterly or triannual

Standard abbreviations
- ISO 4: ARQ

Indexing
- ISSN: 0716-0852 (print); 0717-6996 (web)

Links
- Journal homepage

ARQ is a professional magazine published by the School of Architecture of the Pontifical Catholic University of Chile. It publishes articles on a wide range of architecture-related topics, primarily on issues that are relevant to Chile and South America. Each issue is centered on one theme.
