= Noah's Ark (disambiguation) =

Noah's Ark was the vessel built by Noah in the Genesis flood narrative.

Noah's Ark or Arc can also refer to:

== Attractions ==
=== Religious theme parks ===
- Ark Encounter in Kentucky, USA
- Noah's Ark (Hong Kong), a full-sized interpretation of the Biblical Noah's Ark at Ma Wan Park, Hong Kong

=== Nonreligious theme parks ===
- Noah's Ark Water Park, Wisconsin Dells, United States
- Noah's Ark Animal Sanctuary, an American exotic animal rescue center
- Noah's Ark Zoo Farm, an animal park in Somerset, UK
- Noah's Ark (fun house), an amusement park attraction from the early 20th century

== Films ==
- Noah's Ark (1928 film), a Warner Bros. film with talking sequences and a synchronized score
- Father Noah's Ark, a 1933 Walt Disney Silly Symphonies short
- Noah's Ark (1959 film), a Walt Disney stop-motion animated short
- Noah's Ark (miniseries), a 1999 TV miniseries starring Jon Voight
- Noah's Ark (2007 film) (El Arca), an Argentine animated movie
- Noah's Arc: Jumping the Broom, a 2008 film based on the LOGO television series Noah's Arc
- Noah's Ark (2024 film), a 2024 Brazil/Indian animated musical comedy film

== Television series ==
- Noah's Arc (TV series), a drama centered on a group of gay black men
- Noah's Ark, a 1956 TV series starring Paul Burke as a veterinarian
- Noah's Ark (British TV series), about a country vet
- Noah's Ark, a 2015 VeggieTales video

== Games ==
- Noah's Ark (video game), a Europe-only 1992 NES game published by Konami
- Super 3D Noah's Ark, a North America-only 1994 unlicensed SNES game published by Wisdom Tree
- Noah's Ark (game), a 2002 Windows puzzle game published by PopCap Games

== Literature ==
- Noah's Ark (Spier book), a 1977 children's picture book by Peter Spier
- Noah's Ark (Pinkney book), a 2002 children's picture book by Jerry Pinkney

== Other uses ==
- Noah's Ark (album), by the band CocoRosie
- Noah's Ark (Poulakis), a 17th-century painting by Theodore Poulakis
- Noah's Ark Trap, a chess opening
- Operation Noah's Ark, an Israeli action in 2002
- Noah's Ark, nickname of a former roof extension of Mansion House in the City of London
- Noah's ark or Noah's ark shell, the common name of Arca noae, a marine bivalve mollusk
- Noah's Ark silver coins, Armenian bullion coins, issued since 2011
- Noah's Ark, a hamlet to the south of Kemsing in Kent, England

== See also ==
- Noah's Ark replicas and derivatives
  - Johan's Ark, a full-sized interpretation of the biblical Noah's Ark at Dordrecht, Netherland
- "Noah and the Ark", an episode of Mel-O-Toons
- Category:Noah's Ark in popular culture
