= Anil K. Bera =

Indian-American econometrician

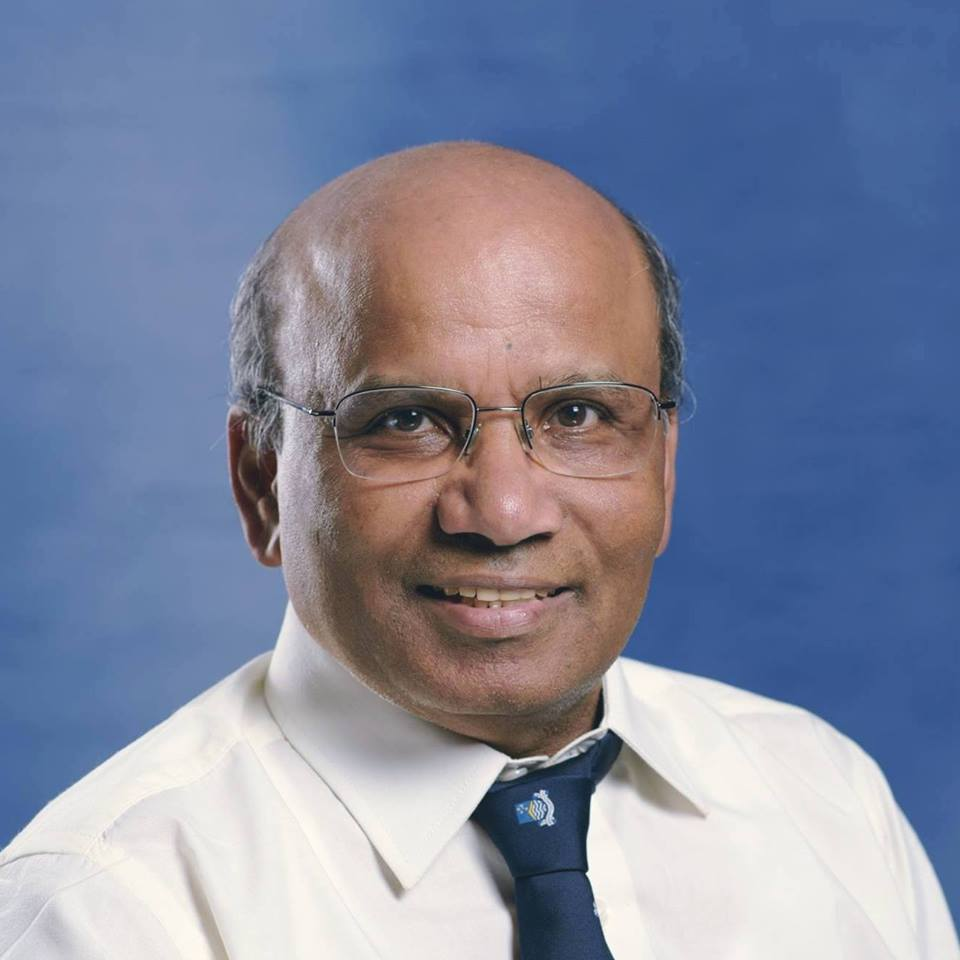
- Bera in 2024
- Born: 1955 (age 70–71); West Bengal, India
- Education: Ramakrishna Mission Residential College, Calcutta University (B.Sc.); Indian Statistical Institute (M.Sc.); Australian National University (Ph.D.)
- Known for: Jarque-Bera test
- Scientific career
- Fields: Economics, Statistics, Spatial econometrics
- Workplaces: University of Illinois at Urbana-Champaign 1991-present American Statistical Association 1996-1998; Econometric Society since 1979

Anil K. Bera (born 1955) is an American econometrician. He is Professor of Economics at University of Illinois at Urbana–Champaign's Department of Economics. He is most noted for his work with Carlos Jarque on the Jarque–Bera test.

== Early life ==
Anil K. Bera was born in a remote village Paschimchak, West Bengal, India. His father was a doctor who charged no formal fees from his patients and relied on voluntary contributions. Bera was living with his seven brothers and two sisters at that time. His mother never went to school but she appreciated and understood the importance of education. She always made sure that Bera never missed a day of school or arrived late.

== Education and career ==
Bera attended his village school Paschimchak Primary School and Jalchak Nateswari Netaji Vidyayatan, Narendrapur Ramakrishna Mission Residential College, and the Indian Statistical Institute, Calcutta and Delhi. In 1971, he was admitted to Ramkrishna Mission Residential College, Narendrapur in 1971, and studied statistics. Bera received a B.Sc. from Calcutta University in 1975 in Statistics, a master's degree from Indian Statistical Institute in 1977 in Econometrics and Planning, and a Ph.D. in 1983 from Australian National University (Phd Aspects of Econometric Modeling). He was also a CORE Fellow at the Université Catholique de Louvain, Belgium.

== Selected publications ==
Books

- Bera, Anil K., Ivliev, S. and Lillo, F. (2015) 'Financial Econometrics and Empirical Market Microstructure'. Springer International Publishing.
