= Stone Bay =

US Marine Corps base in North Carolina

Coordinates: 34.6437°N 77.4126°W

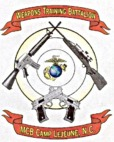
Weapons & Training Battalion logo

Stone Bay is a satellite facility of Marine Corps Base Camp Lejeune in North Carolina. Based on the south side of Camp Lejeune, it is home to Weapons Training Battalion, which functions as the primary facility for weapons qualifications on Camp Lejeune, having several shooting ranges: three rifle ranges, two pistol ranges, and one long sniper range and the headquarters of United States Marine Corps Forces Special Operations Command, with the MARSOC compound on Stone Bay opening in 2010. The parent command responsible for the ranges is Weapons Training Battalion (WTBN). WTBN is broken down into two companies, Range Company and Headquarters Company. Headquarters Company contains the Marksmanship Training Unit, which is responsible for training Marines to become Combat Marksmanship Coaches and Combat Marksmanship Trainers in support of range operations.

Three of the ranges (Alpha, Bravo, and Charlie respectively) are standard USMC ranges up to 500 yards for rifle qualification. An excess of 25,000 Marines from Camp Lejeune conduct their annual rifle qualifications at Stone Bay. Two pistol ranges are standard USMC known distances. One range is the known and unknown distance sniper course. 1,000 meters is the longest known distance shot on this range.

Stone Bay's rifle ranges have also been utilized for the purpose of testing new annual rifle training qualifications for the Marine Corps at several points in its history, most recently during the transition from the Annual Rifle Training (ART) course of fire to the Annual Rifle Qualification (ARQ). The new ARQ course of fire has an intent of replicating combat conditions where participating Marines "Close distance" with a human-sized target starting at the 500 yard line, advancing to the 300, 200, 100, and 25 yard lines over the course of fire conducting numerous shooting drills. In August and September of 2020, a total of 205 Marines from the ranks of Private to Captain completed two trial runs of the ARQ course of fire at Stone Bay utilizing the M16 rifle, M4 carbine, and M27 Infantry Automatic Rifle. The Marine Corps has since adopted ARQ as its standard annual qualifying course of fire for service rifles.
