= Ark 2 =

Ark 2 may refer to:

- Ark 2 (album), a 1969 album released by Flaming Youth
- Ark II, an American television series
- Ark Two Shelter, a nuclear fallout shelter near Toronto, Ontario, Canada
- Ark 2 (video game), the announced possible sequel to the Ark: Survival Evolved video game
