= Beru (company) =

Diesel cold start systems company

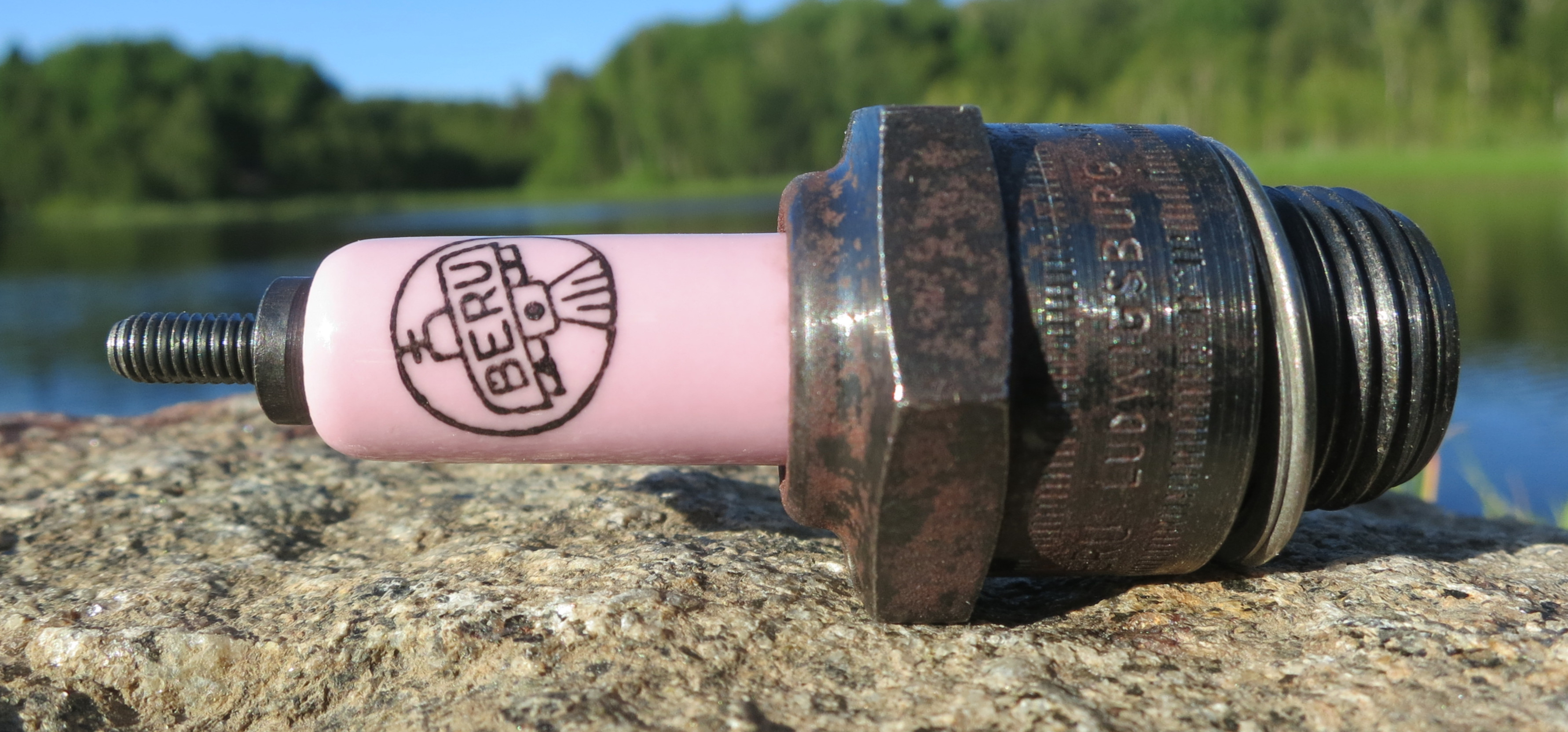
Mid-20th-century spark plug by Beru.

BERU Group is a listed public company since October 1997. The company was founded as a spark plug factory by Julius Behr and Albert Ruprecht in 1912. The company is the leading manufacturer of diesel cold start systems with an estimated worldwide market share of 40 % for glow plugs. In the field of ignition technology for petrol engines, BERU is one of the four major manufacturers in Europe. BERU makes electronics for cars. The company also produces sensor technology and ignition systems for the oil and gas burner industry. Almost all OE-manufacturers of automobiles, commercial vehicles and engines are BERU's customers. The company's headquarters are located in Ludwigsburg, Germany. BERU was acquired by BorgWarner in 2010.

== Sources ==
- "Germany: BorgWarner acquires Beru-Eichenauer". automotiveworld.com. May 4, 2010.
