= Ark (British band) =

arK
- Origin: Birmingham, England
- Genres: Progressive rock, hard rock
- Years active: 1986–1995, 2010–present
- Members: Ant Short; Pete Wheatley; Steve Harris; John Jowitt; Tim Churchman
- Past members: Gel Newey; Hugh Edwards; Paul Rogers; Richard Deane; Gary Davis; Dave Robbins
- Website: www.arkmusic.co.uk

Ark, stylized as arK, are a musical group formed around Birmingham and The Black Country, England. Originally active from c.1985 to c.1995, the band reformed in 2010. The group's sound is a mixture of progressive rock and pop rock styles.

== History ==
Ark formed from earlier bands Damascus and Kite, in 1985. Having won a following around the Midlands they began to venture further and gained a following around the UK and in parts of Europe.

The band's line-up began with Ant Short, Peter Wheatley, Steve Harris, Andy Harris (bass) and Dave Robbins (drums). In 1986 Andy was replaced by John Jowitt and the band first entered the recording studio, the fruit of which were an early set of cassette only singles. In 1987 the band entered a local Battle Of The Bands competition at Edward's Number 8 in Birmingham and won time at The Rich Bitch Recording Studios after beating Slowburner and Fayre Warning in the final. Following the recording session they released the first album: The Dreams Of Mr Jones. It won them several reviews and gained them fans up and down the country. In 1988 Gary Davis replaced Dave Robbins on drums and in 1989 the group changed drummers again, this time bringing in Richard Deane (who had previously played in The First with John Jowitt). With this line-up they recorded and released their New Scientist EP and began touring throughout the UK.

In the autumn of 1989 the band toured as the support for IQ, who were playing a short UK tour. It was an association that was to motivate John to move on. In 1990 IQ were looking for a new bass player, and called John. The band parted on good terms and the search was on for a new bass player. It came in the guise of Gel, who had previously played in local "mekal" bands. They soon set about working towards another tour, but Richard then decided he too wanted to leave, so in early 1991 a young metal drummer Paul Rogers joined the band.

The line-up now settled again, set about touring the UK and Europe. After the first recording session with the line-up, the release the Cover Me With Rain EP to much acclaim in the rock press and set about touring both the UK and Northern Europe. Following extensive writing sessions and a very successful recording session, they release the album Spiritual Physics in 1992.

Despite good reviews and an increasing fanbase, the major record companies were proving hard to convince and after several long and extensive tours the band decided to call it a day. Paul decided to leave before a final tour, and the band recruited Hugh Edwards on drums to help them say farewell to their fans. Their final gig was on 13 March 1995 at The Flapper & Firkin in Birmingham.

Late in 2009 it was confirmed that Ant Short, Peter Wheatley and Steve Harris had reformed Ark, with John Jowitt returning on bass and new member Tim Churchman from Darwin's Radio on drums. New material is being written, and the band is rehearsing for some live dates, including the Summer's End progressive rock festival in October 2010. New album is currently being recorded and is set for a September 2010 release. The band have also retitled themselves as "arK", with the capitalisation at the end.

== Line-up ==
=== Current members ===
- Ant Short – vocals and flute
- Peter Wheatley – guitar and backing vocals
- Steve Harris – synth-guitar
- John Jowitt – bass
- Tim Churchman – drums

=== Former members ===
- Richard Deane – drums
- Gel Newey – bass
- Paul Rogers – drums
- Andy Harris – bass
- Dave Robbins – drums

== Discography ==
Albums

- 1988 - The Dreams of Mr Jones (AMA Records)
- 1990 - Stand Alone (AMA Records) (cassette album only)
- 1990 - Archives 1983-1990 (AMA Records) (cassette album only)
- 1992 - Spiritual Physics (AMA Records)
- 2010 - Wild Untamed Imaginings (ProgRock Records)

Singles/EPs

- 1986 - Home for the Summer/Nowhere's Ark (ARK Records) (cassette single)
- 1986 - Communications/Hands Down (ARK Records) (cassette single)
- 1986 - Trinity EP - Through the Night/Paper Ladder (ARK Records) (cassette single)
- 1986 - The Scattering EP - "The Scattering/Flag Day/Gaia/The Teller" (ARK Records) (cassette single)
- 1987 - Communications/Home for the Summer (AMA Records) (7" single)
- 1989 - New Scientist EP - Calling You Now/Eighth Deadly Sin/New Scientist/Boudicca's Chariot (AMA Records) (12" single)
- 1992 - Cover Me With Rain EP (AMA Records) (CD single)
