= Arc reactor =

Arc reactor may refer to:

- Arc reactor (Marvel Cinematic Universe), a power source in the Marvel Cinematic Universe
- an apparatus for producing C_{60} and other fullerenes
- Plasma arc waste disposal reactor, a type of waste processing system
- ARC fusion reactor (affordable, robust, compact), a theoretical design for a compact fusion reactor developed by the Massachusetts Institute of Technology
