= Willie Bera =

Papua New Guinean footballer

Personal information
- Full name: Willie Bera
- Date of birth: August 10, 1964 (age 62)
- Place of birth: Lahi, Papua New Guinea
- Position: Goalkeeper

Senior career*
Years	Team	Apps	(Gls)
1996–2002	Lahi Guria		

International career
1996–1997	Papua New Guinea	6	(0)
- * Club domestic league appearances and goals

Willie Bera (born 10 August 1964) is a Papua New Guinean former footballer who played as a goalkeeper.

== International career ==
He won six caps for the Papua New Guinea national football team between 1996 and 1997.
