= Archaeological Recording Kit =

Archaeological Recording Kit (ARK) is a web-based, open source software package for recording and disseminating archaeological data. ARK is primarily designed for recording excavations, but can also be used for archaeological surveys, palaeoenvironmental research and collections management.

ARK is based on the LAMP stack and MapServer, and is free software released under the GNU GPL. It was developed by L-P Archaeology, a British commercial archaeology practice.

The Fasti Online project was built using an ARK back-end, and demonstrates its usage beyond normal archaeological recording.
