= Bero (name) =

Bero is a given name and a surname which may refer to:

- Bero (bishop of Lausanne), Bishop of Lausanne from 932 to 947
- Bero (bishop of Finland), mid 13th century
- Bero Beyer (born 1970), Dutch film producer
- Johnny Bero (1922–1985), American Major League Baseball player
- Lisa Bero (born 1958), American academic
- Matúš Bero (born 1995), Slovak footballer
- Robert Bero (1941–2007), American artist and print maker
