= ARRC =

ARRC may stand for:

- Advanced Radar Research Center, University of Oklahoma, Oklahoma, USA
- Advanced Institute for Research on Religion and Culture, Hyderabad, India
- Advanced Rocket Research Center, NCTU, Taiwan
- Allied Rapid Reaction Corps, based in Gloucestershire, England
- American-Russian Relief Committee, USA
- Associate Royal Red Cross, a UK military nursing decoration
- Asia Road Racing Championship, a motorcycle championship in Asia
- ARrC, South Korean boy group
