= Arch of Triumph =

Arch of Triumph may refer to:

- Triumphal arch, a monumental structure in the shape of an arch

== Structures ==
- Arc de Triomf, an 1888 structure in Barcelona, Spain
- Arc de Triomphe de l'Étoile, an 1836 structure in the Place Charles de Gaulle, Paris, France
- Arc de Triomphe du Carrousel, an 1808 structure in Paris, France
- Arcul de Triumf, a 1936 structure in Bucharest, Romania
- Arch of Triumph, a 1982 structure in Pyongyang, North Korea
- Monumental Arch, a 3rd-century structure in Palmyra, Syria
- Siegestor, an 1852 structure in Munich, Germany
- Triumphal Arch, an 1841 structure in Chișinău, Moldova
- Triumphal Arch of Orange, a 1st-century structure and the oldest surviving triple-arched Roman triumphal arch
- United States Triumphal Arch, a proposed 2025 structure in Washington, D.C., United States

== Media ==
- Arch of Triumph, a 1945 Erich Maria Remarque novel
- Arch of Triumph, a 1948 American film
- Arch of Triumph, a 1984 British TV film, remake of the 1948 film
