= Narg =

Narg نرگ
- Village
- Location within Iran
- Coordinates: 35°40′53″N 59°42′52″E
- Country: Iran
- Province: Razavi Khorasan
- County: Fariman
- Bakhsh: Central
- Rural District: Fariman

Population (2006)
  - Total: 82
- Time zone: UTC+3:30 (IRST)
  - Summer (DST): UTC+4:30 (IRDT)

Narg (Persian: نرگ; also known as Ark and Nark) is a village in Fariman Rural District, in the Central District of Fariman County, Razavi Khorasan Province, Iran. At the 2006 census, its population was 82, in 20 families.
