= Ark (search engine) =

Ark is a personal search engine that uses filters such as hometown, current city, high school, college, gender, relationship status, employee, and interests, to search for new people, old classmates, old friends or acquaintances, and new business contacts. Features include managing users' inboxes from their mobile devices, and syncing data from their Yahoo, Aol, Gmail or Google Apps email accounts, while also finding information about whom they are communicating with.

The service aggregates "ghost profiles" from social media outlets such as Facebook, LinkedIn, and Angel list.

The company was founded by Patrick Riley and Yiming Liu in March 2012. Prior to founding Ark, the team worked at Google, AOL, Symantec, Lithium and Yahoo! Research. Ark is based in San Francisco, California.

== History ==
Ark was part of the Winter 2012 Y Combinator class. The company was one of TechCrunch Disrupt NYC's 2012 Battlefield Finalists.

== Privacy ==
Ark is a social search engine designed to help individuals filter, search, and connect with people they should know. Acting as a landing page, users have to authenticate their Ark profile, although unlike any other social media, the user’s data and information is already aggregated and used to create that user’s complete profile. Ark’s technology has been tested to make sure that each Ark user profile is frequently updated to ensure that each user’s recent offline and online are accurately represented. Ark does this by accessing the public data collected from Ark members, while adhering to the pre-existing privacy settings of other social networks. Ark only indexes publicly available data. The Ark search engine will provide users with a thorough search engine for people based on a combination of qualities and locations.
