= Berra (surname) =

Berra is an Italian surname. Notable people with the surname include:

- Christophe Berra (born 1985), Scottish football player
- Dale Berra (born 1956), American baseball player and son of Yogi Berra
- Reto Berra (born 1987), Swiss hockey player
- Steve Berra (born 1973), American skateboarder
- Tim Berra (biologist) (born 1943), American biologist and author
- Tim Berra (American football) (born 1951), American football player and son of Yogi Berra
- Yogi Berra (1925–2015), American baseball player and manager
