= ARX (company) =

Digital security company

ARX (Algorithmic Research Ltd.)
- Type: Private company
- Industry: Digital security
- Founded: 1987
- Founders: Amos Fiat, Yossi Tulpan
- Fate: Acquired
- Successor: DocuSign
- Headquarters: San Francisco, California, U.S.
- Number of locations: United Kingdom, Netherlands, Australia, Israel
- Area served: Worldwide
- Products: ARX CoSign, digital signature solutions
- Parent: DocuSign (from 2015)
- Website: www.arx.com

ARX (Algorithmic Research Ltd.) is a digital security company headquartered in San Francisco, CA, with offices in the UK, the Netherlands, Australia and Israel. It is the creator of ARX CoSign, a digital signature technology, along with related digital signature security technology products. ARX was acquired by DocuSign in May 2015.

The ARX digital signature products are based on public key infrastructure (PKI) technology, with the digital signatures resulting from a cryptographic operation that creates a "fingerprint" unique to both the signer and the content. This process provides proof of signer identity, data integrity and the non-repudiation of signed documents, all of which can be verified without the need for proprietary verification software.

The CoSign solution of the company integrates into a large range of document management and workflow automation systems.

ARX solutions have been validated for security standards such as NIST FIPS 140-2 level 3, FIPS 186 and ETSI TS 101 733. In August 2014, CoSign received Common Criteria EAL4+ certification, thus becoming the first remote / server-side digital signature solution to be fully compliant with the EU's newly enacted Electronic Identification and Trust Services regulation for Electronic Transactions in the Internal Market (eIDAS).

== History ==
ARX was founded in 1987 by Prof. Amos Fiat and Yossi Tulpan and focused on developing encryption-based products. In September 1997 ARX was acquired by Cylink Corp (NASDAQ:CYLK) from Sunnyvale, California.

In 2001 the company went through a management buyout (MBO) initiated by Dr. Gadi Aharoni. In May 2015, ARX was acquired by its U.S. competitor DocuSign.
