= ARC Magazine =

Art magazine covering contemporary Caribbean art and culture

- Cover of Issue N°3, July 2011, artwork by Lavar Munroe
- Director and Editor-in-Chief: Holly Bynoe
- Categories: Art magazines
- Frequency: Biannual
- Format: print and digital
- Circulation: 1,000 (readership 3,000)
- Founder: Holly Bynoe and Nadia Huggins
- Founded: 2011
- Country: Saint Vincent and the Grenadines
- Based in: Bequia
- Language: English
- Website: arcthemagazine.com
- ISSN: 0952-1143
- OCLC: 710060624

ARC Magazine is an art magazine covering contemporary Caribbean art and culture. It was founded in 2011 as a non-profit print and digital magazine publication with an active web following. ARC profiles established and emerging artists living in the Caribbean, as well as the Caribbean diaspora.

== Background ==
"ARC" stands for "Art. Recognition. Culture." The magazine is printed in Iceland by Oddi. The magazine was founded in 2011 by Nadia Huggins and Holly Bynoe, both visual artists from St. Vincent and the Grenadines. Bynoe earned her MFA in Advanced Photographic Studies from Bard College in Annandale-on-Hudson, New York. The magazine has hosted art exhibited and, in 2013 and 2014, partnered with VOLTA NY to host artists discussions and exhibitions. ARC Magazine has also partnered with the Trinidad and Tobago Film Festival.

The magazine began as a quarterly publication with a modest print run of 500 in a large format of 12" H x 9" W.

== Content ==
Departments in ARC Magazine include: "Spotlight," a showcase of four emerging artists; "24FPS," film section; "The Gradient," an analysis of a series or project of art; "Artist on Artist"; "Collections," a portfolio of artists working in New Media; and a cultural department and literary section, featuring poetry and creative writing. Speaking of the magazine's missions, Bynoe has stated: "Debunking stereotypes has been a formal concern and one of the key objectives of ARC."

== See also ==
- Caribbean art
- Havana Biennial
