= Borai =

Borai برايي
- Village
- Location within Iran
- Coordinates: 31°00′32″N 51°13′01″E
- Country: Iran
- Province: Kohgiluyeh and Boyer-Ahmad
- County: Dana
- Bakhsh: Pataveh
- Rural District: Pataveh

Population (2006)
  - Total: 445
- Time zone: UTC+3:30 (IRST)
  - Summer (DST): UTC+4:30 (IRDT)

Borai (Persian: برايي, also Romanized as Borā’ī and Berā’ī; also known as Berā and Deh-e Berey) is a village in Pataveh Rural District, Pataveh District, Dana County, Kohgiluyeh and Boyer-Ahmad Province, Iran. At the 2006 census, its population was 445, in 84 families.
