= The Ark (Antarctica) =

Mountain in Antarctica

The Ark (80°43′S 24°47′W) is a rock summit, 1,790 m (5,870 ft), in the central part of the Read Mountains, in the Shackleton Range in Antarctica. First mapped in 1957 by the CTAE. The name, given by the United Kingdom Antarctic Place-Names Committee (UK-APC), is descriptive of its shape when viewed from the west.
