= Tower of Bera =

Structure in Coimbra, Portugal

- Torre de Bera
- Coimbra, Baixo Mondego, Centro in Portugal

Site information
- Type: Castle
- Owner: Portuguese Republic
- Open to the public: Private

Location
- Coordinates: 40°8′51.5″N 8°23′59.3″W

Site history
- Materials: Tuff limestone, Sandstone

The Tower of Bera (Portuguese: Torre de Bera) is the remains of a medieval watchtower located in the civil parish of Almalaguês, in the municipality of Coimbra, Portuguese Coimbra.

== History ==
The medieval tower of Bera was probably constructed in the high Middle Ages, between the 9th and 11th century, when the town was twice conquered from Muslim forces by troops of Alfonso III and later definitively by troops loyal to Ferdinand I of León 1064. António Nogueira Gonçalves notes its strategic position along the line of defensive fortifications tied to Coimbra, that connected the valley of Mondego and Penela, across the River Dueça; this modest redoubt complimented the larger castles in Penela, Miranda and Coimbra. There continue to be numerous interventions into the isolated tower. One of these refer to its exact chronology. Nogueira Gonçalves catalogued its history to the 12th century. The fact that some Roman material was reused to erect the structure, suggest a history that extends further back, before the 10th century.

The tower was probably constructed between the late 11th and final third of the 12th century, receiving its name from the small local village. There are few documents that refer to the Tower of Bera, but it passed through regal donation, which normally occurred to lands conquered from the Moors. Consequently, it is probable that it was included in the territory neighbouring lands, such as Almalaguês, seat of the current parish, or Ceira. Ceira, in September 1180, was donated by D. Afonso Henriques to his chancellor Julião. In fact, Almalaguês, along with Cernache and Sobreiro, were donated in the 15th century by the regent Pedro to Guilherme Arnao. The debate on its purpose extends from persistent issues associated with its origin and original function. Opinion suggest that it was a building founded by local initiative, from the seigneurial masters and local inhabitants. But, there is modest evidence of other towers (such as the disappeared structure in Castelo Viegas), suggesting a direct relationship with the other larger castles of the region, indicating that this was not just a private rural fortification, but part of a grander vision laid-out from Coimbra and encompassing the south of the river. It is likely, therefore, that its passing into the hands of private families may have begun in the late medieval period. In the first half of the 15th century, it was part of the ducal properties in Almalaguês, donated to the Infante Pedro. At that time, the tower was placed into the control of Guilherme Arnao.

In the 14th century, the master of the Tower of Bera was Gaspar de Voalas. It was later preceded by the dominion of Francisco Pires da Cunha, married to Mécia Faria.

By 1949, the four walls remained, with the northeastern angle being destroyed and missing from its profile. Along with much of its damage, there were cracks/slits in the walls and the main door dismantled.

On 2 August 1995, there was a proposal to classify the building as Valor Concelhio (Municipal Valor). By May 1996, the process was in a state of consultation by the IPPAR Instituto Português do Património Arquitectónico, predecessor of Instituto de Gestão do Património Arquitectónico e Arqueológico (IGESPAR). On 24 February 2003, a dispatch identified the closing of the process to classify the watchtower.

In 2005, the tower survived wildfires that devastated the region. There was a popular proposal in 2009 for the implementation of a conservation and restoration project to rehabilitate the tower: but it did not pass.

== Architecture ==
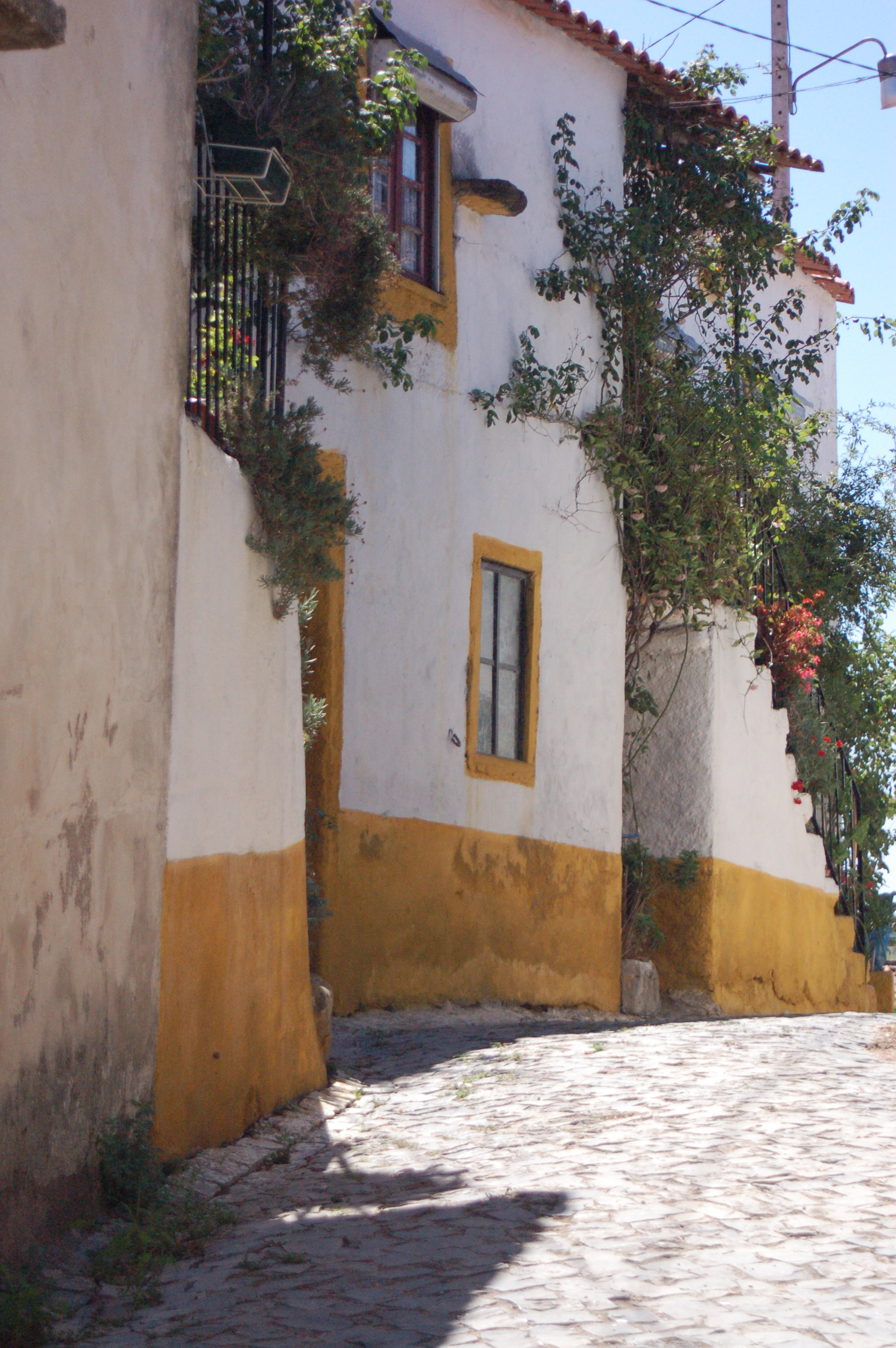
The medieval road leading to the tower of Bera, on the edge of the settlement

The tower is situated in an isolated, urban area in the relief of the landscape. It is encircled by dense vegetation and forest, with a dominant panorama over the valley. It is erected over a rocky outcrop, a short distance from the medieval settlement. In the interior and surrounding the structure are many of the stones from the ruined walls.

It consists of a regular square plan, conserving the southern and eastern walls. In 1949 it still retained vestiges of the three floors, but most of the upper floors were in ruin. One of the important characteristics was the existence of rudimentary embrasures on the second floor, indicating the need to maintain military vigilance against the Muslim forces. In 1952, in his second text on the tower, Nogueira Gonçalves lamented "its state...of advanced ruin", altering to the fact the northwest angle had fallen and that large cracks had in most parts of the tower.

It still retains the medieval character of the Middle Ages, along with costumes and traditions from this period, much of the study associated with the "life" of the tower have been completed by Dr. Margarida Ribeiro. In 1938, it was the runner-up in the "A Aldeia mais portuguesa de Portugal" (The Most Portuguese Town of Portugal). Studies by Dr. Ribeiro suggest that there are oral traditions speaking to a round roof/ceiling. Visiting in 1949, A. Nogueira Gonçalves indicated that the tower gate was found on the ground; its rectangular door was considered simple in terms of construction.
