= Ark Clothing =

British clothing retailer

www.ark.co.uk
- Company type: Limited
- Industry: Retail
- Founded: 1992
- Defunct: April 2016
- Headquarters: Leeds, United Kingdom
- Number of employees: 80
- Website: www.ark.co.uk

Ark Clothing was part of Ark Fashion Limited, a subsidiary of JD Sports PLC. It operated five physical stores and an e-commerce site in the United Kingdom.

They were official stockists to a number of branded fashion labels. The men's range included own label CLOAK, plus Superdry, Carhartt, Franklin & Marshall, Fred Perry, Original Penguin and Pretty Green; the women's range included Motel, Fred Perry, Mink Pink, The Ragged Priest and own label, Hearts & Bows.

== History ==
ARK opened its first store in The Corn Exchange in Leeds in 1992. The shop was originally used to sell tickets to the ARK club nights but quickly branched into streetwear. The store was an immediate success and grew quickly in size. The brand grew to have five brick and mortar stores, with many plans to expand across the UK plus an e-commerce store.

== Closing ==
In January 2016, JD Sports PLC announced it planned to close all Ark Clothing stores, three years after they acquired the company out of administration. Ark Clothing announced this on their Instagram page and shortly after a closing down sale was launched. By mid May 2016, all Ark stores were closed and their website shut down.
