= Alabama Regional Communications System =

American alert notification communications district

The Alabama Regional Communications System (ARCS) is a radio/alert notification communications district with responsibility for providing user-based administration for operations and maintenance of the interoperable communications system that serves Calhoun County, Alabama and Talladega County, Alabama. The Motorola trunked radio system is licensed by the Federal Communications Commission (FCC) to operate on radio frequency spectrum in the 800 megahertz (MHz) public safety band.

== Background ==
The Calhoun-Talladega 800 MHz communications system was originally developed and installed to enhance interoperability and to provide alert and notification for the community during the destruction of chemical weapons at the Anniston Army Depot (ANAD). The communications system was funded and maintained through a federal grant known as the Chemical Stockpile Emergency Preparedness Program (CSEPP), a joint United States Army and Federal Emergency Management Agency (FEMA) program designed to provide community education and emergency preparedness resources in the event of a chemical agent emergency. The original communications system, a Legacy system with analog trunking, went on-the-air in 1998 and quickly became the primary means of two-way communications for most public safety agencies in Calhoun and Talladega Counties, replacing their standalone conventional radio repeaters. In 2006, the CSEPP communications system was upgraded to a digital Project 25 Motorola Type II SmartZone version 7.4 linear simulcast/multicast trunked 800 MHz communications system.

The facilities at ANAD, known as Anniston Chemical Activity (ANCA), stored approximately seven percent of the nation's chemical weapon's stockpile including VX (nerve agent) and Sarin (GB) agent. ANAD was one of nine United States Army installations in the United States that stored chemical weapons. The United States Army began incinerating the stored weapons on August 9, 2003. The destruction of ANAD's chemical weapons stockpile was controversial, in part, because of the potential danger to the surrounding community should an incident occur during weapons disposal operations. In September 2011, the US Army's Chemical Materials Agency (CMA) successfully completed the safe elimination of ANAD's chemical weapons stockpile.

== Funding Transition ==
As a result of the completion of chemical warfare disposal operations at ANAD, all federal funding for the communities surrounding the Anniston Army Depot will end on March 31, 2012. This includes funding for operations and maintenance of the CSEPP communications system. Over the years, the community has become increasingly dependent upon the capabilities of the communications system, in particular, because of reliability, interoperability, capacity and in-building coverage. It provides 24-7-365 voice and data communications services for nearly 3,000 users including law enforcement, fire and rescue, emergency medical services, school facilities and buses, hospitals, transportation, utilities and many other agencies. It also provides activation signaling for almost 200 outdoor warning sirens located throughout both counties. By the time chemical weapons disposal was completed, the system was serving nearly 100 percent of the mission-critical communications needs in Calhoun and Talladega County.

In preparation for the end of CSEPP grant funding, local officials explored alternative strategies to generate funds that would allow continued service and operation of the existing communications system. With the support and cooperation of local and state elected officials, FEMA, consulting firms and the users of the system, an exploratory committee crafted legislation that would allow the users to take ownership of the system.

== New Beginning ==
On June 15, 2011, Alabama Governor Robert J. Bentley signed House Bill 389 into law as Act 2011-675 to create the radio/alert notification communications district. The purpose of this legislation was to create a mechanism for the community to transition the CSEPP communications system from the federal grant funding to locally generated funding, operations and ownership.

As provided by the new Alabama law codified in Sections 11-31-1 to 11–31–4, Code of Alabama 1975 (as amended), the Calhoun and Talladega County Commissions made their respective appointments to the communications district's board of directors (term of appointment listed in parentheses):

CALHOUN COUNTY
Mr. Mike Fincher, Director of Safety, Calhoun County Board of Education (4)
Police Chief Bill Partridge, Oxford, Alabama (3)
Ms. Melonie Carmichael, emergency management specialist, Jacksonville State University (3)
Fire Chief Mike Howard, Alexandria, Alabama (2)

TALLADEGA COUNTY
Police Chief Travis McGrady, Lincoln, Alabama (4)
Police Chief Alan Watson, Talladega, Alabama (3)
Mr. Andy McWilliams, facility operations manager, Talladega Superspeedway (3)
Fire Chief Danny Warwick, Talladega, Alabama (2)

The duly appointed board of directors convened for the first time on September 1, 2011, the first day of their appointment terms. With all members present, a motion passed unanimously to officially name the communications district as the Alabama Regional Communications System. The ARCS board of directors meetings are open to the public, with regularly scheduled monthly meetings held on the second Tuesday of every month at the Oxford, Alabama Police Department and Municipal Court, 600 Stanley Merrill Drive, Oxford, Alabama 36203.

On April 1, 2012, the ARCS will become fully responsible for administration and operation of the 800 MHz system, with assets estimated at a value of approximately 100 million dollars. At that time, the cost of operating the system will be 100 percent funded by revenue collected from user fees. Based on the current predicted costs to operate and maintain the system, the ARCS board of directors has determined the monthly user fee as $22.50 per two-way radio device (mobile, portable, modem, siren control) and $50.00 per dispatch console (rate applies to local users in Calhoun and Talladega County).

The formula for determining the user fee is based on the total estimated annual costs to operate the communications system compared to the projected total number of users subscribing to the system. The current user fees were established based on approximately 2,800 users with a projected annual cost of approximately $760,000 to operate and maintain the system.
