= Bernhard Rosenkränzer =

German free software programmer

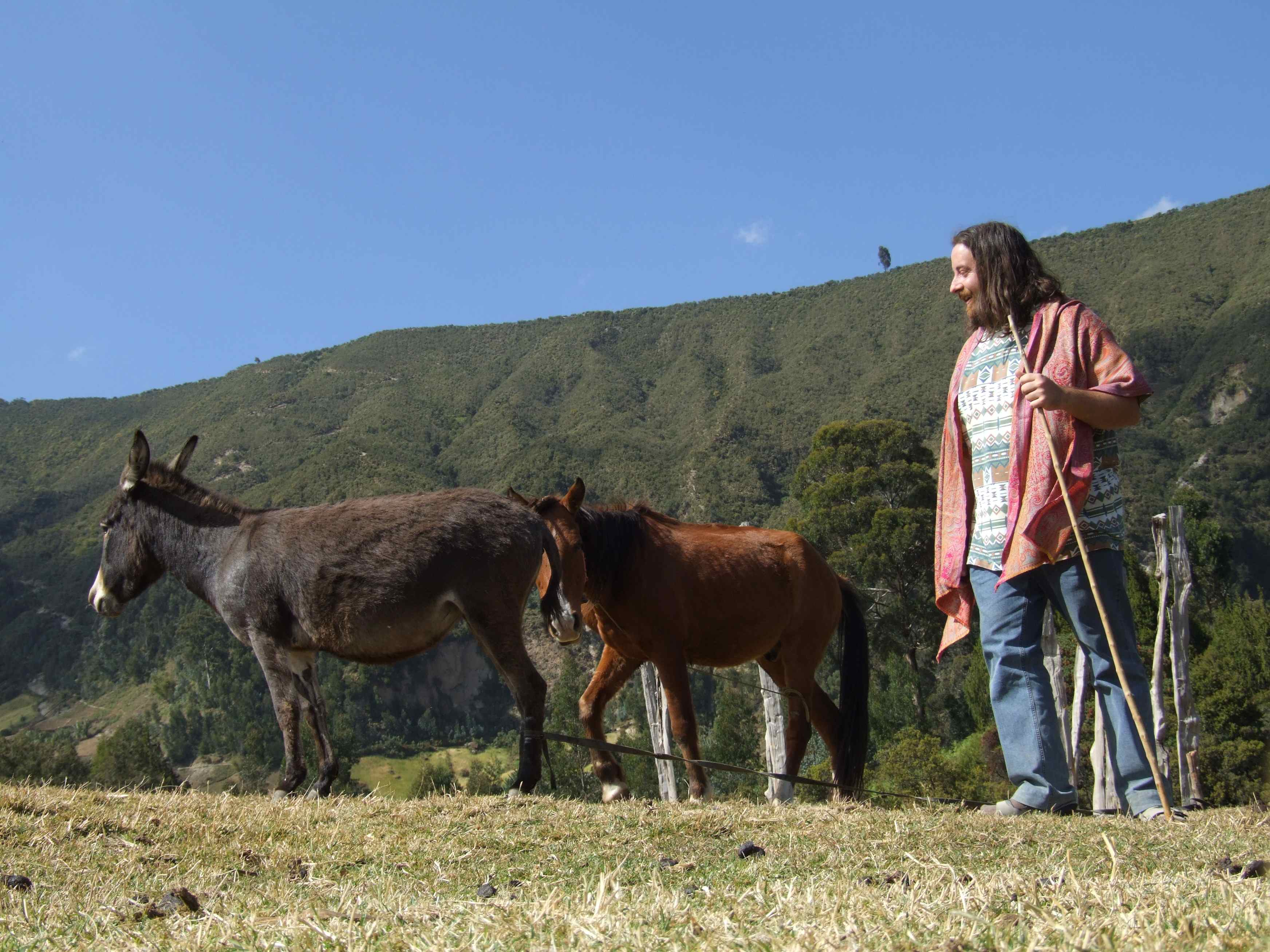
Bero

Bernhard Rosenkränzer (born February 18, 1977) is the founder and main developer of Ark Linux (later merged into OpenMandriva) and a contributor to various other free software projects such as KDE and OpenOffice.org. To many in the Linux community he is known as "Bero", a concatenation of the first two letters of his given and surnames.

His primary interest and work focus is in getting open source and free software ready for the desktop.

Rosenkränzer entered RWTH Aachen University in 1998, where he studied computer science. Before he started classes, he optimized Red Hat Linux by creating his own Linux distribution known as "BeroLinux". During his studies, he started working for Mandrake Linux (later known as Mandriva). Rosenkränzer later accepted an offer to work for Red Hat Linux as a KDE package developer. However, he quit the job due to differences with Red Hat about the future of KDE in Red Hat.

Rosenkränzer also invented an improved system for satellite television distribution to schools in Ethiopia.

Until 2019, Rosenkränzer worked at Linaro, an organization dedicated to improving Linux on ARM processors. He also used to work for ROSA Laboratories, a company delivering their own custom brand of Mandriva Linux for the Russian government. As part of this work, Ark Linux has been merged into OpenMandriva. After leaving Linaro, he turned his side project, an Open Source company called LinDev (short for LINux DEVelopment), into his main business. LinDev is currently involved with building the Eclipse Foundation's Oniro Embedded operating system and works with Ampere Computing on ARM based Linux servers.

In 2012, he has been involved with speeding up Linaro's Android builds by modifying Bionic (software) and making better use of the toolchain.

In 2017, he was the first to build and demo working prototypes of AArch64 based desktop and laptop machines.

He is currently the president of the OpenMandriva Association.
