= Airport Regions Council =

- Location: Brussels, Belgium
- Region served: aviation, airports, airport regions, spatial planning, interregional cooperation, EU projects, communication
- Services: Development and implementation of European projects, advocacy and representation at EU level, production of thematic studies and publications, organisation of events and development of communication campaigns.
- Employees: 3-4

Airport Regions Council (ARC) - formerly known as Airport Regions Conference, is an association of regional and local authorities with an international airport within or near their territories, founded in 1994.

Currently, the ARC has more than 30 members, ranging from regions hosting the largest hubs in Europe (e.g. Frankfurt, Madrid, etc.) to small regional airports (Oulu and Iasi).

The governance structure of the organisation includes an executive committee (the President and 7 members), an Assembly (ARC member regions) and a Secretariat of 8 people, which is based in Brussels, Belgium.

== Projects ==
=== Current projects ===
Current projects, in which ARC is a part of:

- OLGA (hOListic Green Airport) – Horizon 2020 funding;
- PULSAR (Propelling eUropean Leadership through Synergizing Aviation Research) – Horizon Europe funding;
- SAMVA (SBAS (EGNOS) Adoption in Multicopter VTOL Aircraft) – EUSPA (European Union Agency for the Space Programme) partial funding;
- MultiModX (Integrated Passenger-Centric Planning of Multimodal Transport Networks) – SESAR3 Joint Undertaking funding.

=== Previous projects ===
Previous projects, in which Airport Regions Council was involved as a communication and dissemination partner, include:

- ANIMA (Aviation Noise Impact Management through Novel Approaches) – Horizon 2020 funding;
- dAIR (Decarbonising Airport Regions) – Interreg EVC EU funding;
- LAirA (Landside Airport Accessibility) – Interreg Central Europe funding;
- DREAAM (Development of Regional Employment and Airport Areas Manpower) – Erasmus+ funding.

== ARC Members ==
In August 2019, these are the members of ARC:

Austria

- Vienna City Council

Belgium

- Flemish Brabant Province
- Wallonia The Walloon Company of Airports

Czech Republic

- Prague Airport Region

Finland

- Oulu Town Council
- Uusimaa Regional Council
- Vantaa City Council

France

- IAU Île-de-France (Paris Region Planning and Development Agency)
- Val d'Oise Department

Germany

- State of Berlin & State of Brandenburg
- Frankfurt Rhein-Main Regional Authority
- Rhine-Neckar Metropolitan Region

Hungary

- Budapest District XVIII

Ireland

- Fingal County Council

Malta

- Transport Malta

Poland

- Mazovia Region

Romania

- Iași County Council

Spain

- Barcelona Municipal County
- Government of Catalonia
- El Prat de Llobregat Town Council
- Gavà Town Council
- Madrid City Council

Sweden

- Gothenburg Region
- Municipality of Härryda
- Stockholm County Council & Sigtuna

The Netherlands

- Beek City Council
- Drenthe Province
- Rotterdam City Council

Norway

- Akershus County Council
- Øvre Romerike Development
