= Archaeosine synthase =

Enzyme

Identifiers
- EC no.: 2.6.1.97

Databases
- IntEnz: IntEnz view
- BRENDA: BRENDA entry
- ExPASy: NiceZyme view
- KEGG: KEGG entry
- MetaCyc: metabolic pathway
- PRIAM: profile
- PDB structures: RCSB PDB PDBe PDBsum
Search
- PMC: articles
- PubMed: articles
- NCBI: proteins

Archaeosine synthase (EC 2.6.1.97, ArcS, TgtA2, MJ1022 (gene), glutamine:preQ0-tRNA amidinotransferase) is an enzyme with systematic name L-glutamine:7-cyano-7-carbaguanine aminotransferase. This enzyme catalyses the following chemical reaction

L-glutamine + 7-cyano-7-carbaguanine15 in tRNA + H2O $\rightleftharpoons$ L-glutamate + archaeine^{15} in tRNA

In Euryarchaeota the reaction is catalysed by ArcS.
