= Ark Airways =

Armenian cargo airline

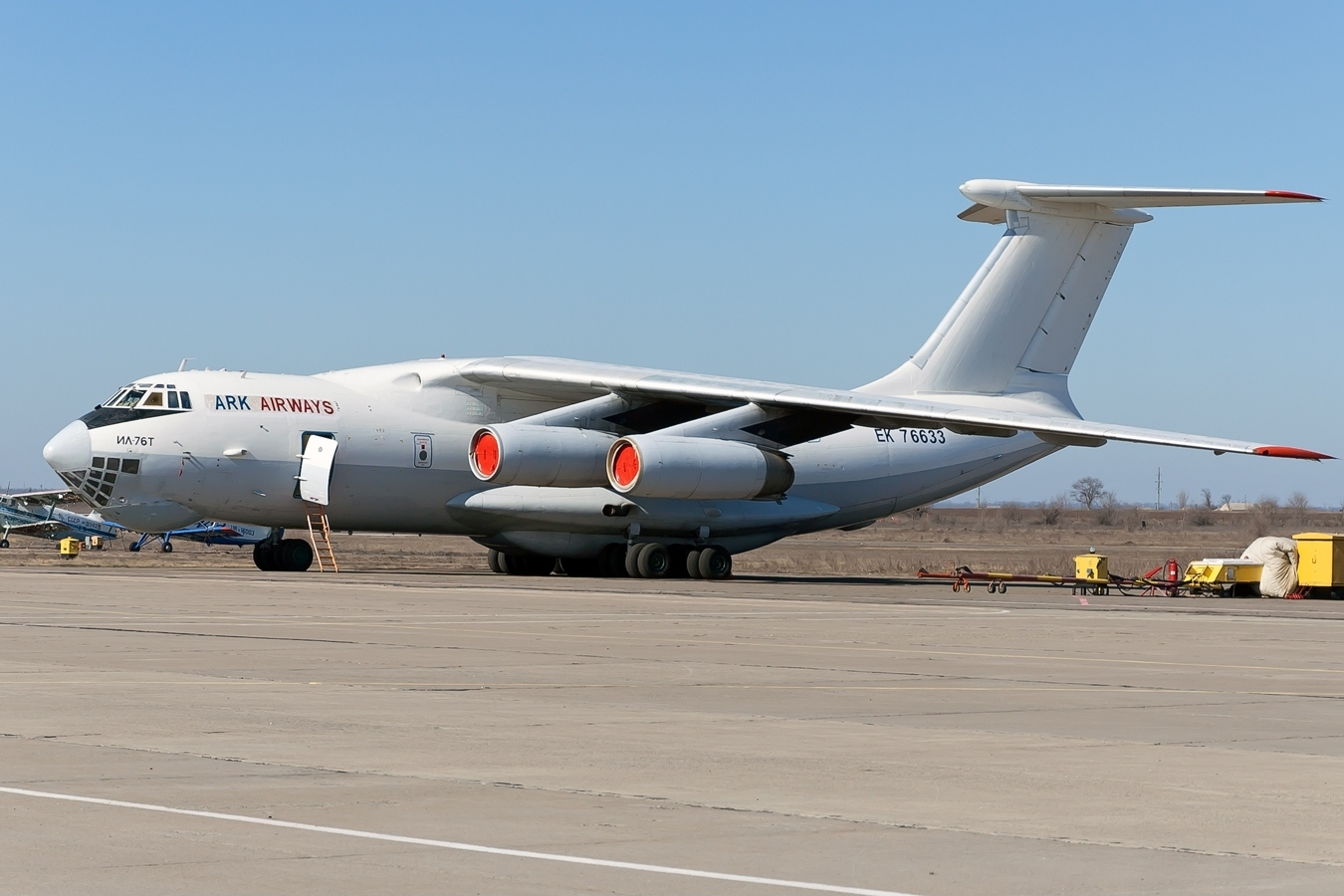
- Ilyushin 76
| IATA | ICAO | Call sign |
|---|---|---|
| ZQ | ARQ | ARK AIRWAYS |
- Founded: 2010
- Ceased operations: 2013
- Operating bases: Zvartnots International Airport
- Fleet size: 8
- Headquarters: Yerevan

Ark Airways was a cargo airline from Armenia, founded in 2010. It had its main hub at the Zvartnots International Airport in Yerevan. Its fleet consisted of a B747-200 and seven Ilyushin Il-76/78/A-50 aircraft. All operations were stopped in 2013.

== Fleet ==
Ark Airways fleet
| Aircraft | Historic fleet | Passenger | Notes |
|---|---|---|---|
| B747-200 | 1 | | ad hoc leased |
| Ilyushin Il-76 | 7 | | |
| Total | 8 | | |

== See also ==
- List of airlines of Armenia
- Transport in Armenia
