= Association for Real Change =

UK disability rights organization

Association for Real Change (ARC)is a UK charity which supports providers of services to people with a learning disability. This is done via a range of projects and initiatives.

== History ==
Association for Real Change (known as ARC) was founded in 1976 as the Association of Residential Communities for the Retarded. For a brief period of time it looked as if 'mental retardation' would come from the United States as the new terminology to replace 'mental handicap' which was unpopular. However, that did not happen and the term 'learning disability' was adopted by the Department of Health (after much debate and some disagreement which continues to today because the term 'learning disability' has a different meaning in the education world). ARC quickly shortened its name to the Association for Residential Communities and then later to the Association for Residential Care. The most recent change reflects the major policy changes in social care in that ARC (which is how it is known) now stands for the Association for Real Change. ARC was incorporated as a registered charity in 1982.

In 1992 the ARC Training Consortium was set up to support members who wanted to increase their own assessor/verifier capacity and to enable their staff to gain the appropriate vocational qualifications. This is now the ARC Qualifications Centre.

It is part of the coalition of charities called the Care Provider Alliance urging the British government to solve the social care crisis and was part of the campaign by the major care provider bodies around the Mental Capacity (Amendment) Bill.

== Organisation ==
The Association for Real Change (ARC) is a forward thinking national charity supporting its members who are providers of Learning Disability and Autism services, and through a range of projects and services, people with a learning disability, autism, or other additional support needs, and their families.

ARC is a UK umbrella organisation that is managed by a board of directors; the current chair is David Sargent. ARC has offices in England, Scotland and Northern Ireland with a Country Director managing each country office. James Fletcher is the director for Scotland. Leslie-Anne Newton is the director for Northern Ireland. Samantha Leonard is the director for England.

See https://arcuk.org.uk/ for details of each nation website.

Previous Chief Executives were; James Churchill who had steered the organisation for over 20 years; Mark Gray (Formerly the Chair of British Institute for learning disabilities); and Jacqueline Bell. Previous Managing Directors were Máire Gallagher and interim Managing Director, Chris Dowell-Bennett.

The organisation is now managed by the Strategic Leadership Team which comprises three Country Directors and the Finance Director.

=== Projects ===
ARC aims at provision for people with a learning disability and is involved in national projects. These projects range from improving management and training programmes and promoting best practices in the learning disability sector to Black and Minority Ethnic projects.

It is particularly concerned with "mate crime", a form of hate crime which they define as a situation where someone makes friends with a person with learning disabilities and goes on to abuse or exploit that relationship. They have campaigned for both police and social workers to be more vigilant of this sort of abuse. Its Safety Net campaign was launched in 2009 and ran for three years. They were aware that these crimes were hidden and especially in rural areas people did not know how to report them and there was not enough support.

In Scotland, along with other projects and services, ARC supports the National Involvement Network, a group of over 80 people with learning disabilities or support needs in Scotland, and their publication of the Charter for Involvement which has been adopted by more than 50 organisations as a guide to good practice.
