= 2023–24 Pafos FC season =

Pafos
2023–24 season
- Owner: Pavel Gognidze
- Manager: Juan Carlos Carcedo
- Stadium: Stelios Kyriakides Stadium
- Cyta Championship: 5th
- Cypriot Cup: Winners
- Top goalscorer: League: Jairo (15); All: Jairo (16)
Home colours	Away colours

The 2023–24 season was Pafos's 10th year in existence, and seventh season in the Cypriot First Division. They finished the season in 5th place in the league and won the Cypriot Cup for the first time, qualifying for the UEFA Europa League for the first time too.

== Season review ==
On 8 June, Pafos announced the signing of Matheus Davó on a season-long loan deal from Cruzeiro.

On 16 June, Pafos extended their contract with Vlad Dragomir.

On 24 June 2023, Juan Carlos Carcedo was announced as the new Head Coach of Pafos.

On 26 June, Pedro Pelágio made his loan move from Marítimo permanent.

On 28 June, Pafos extended their contract with Marios Demetriou.

On 13 July, Mamadou Kané had his loan moved from Olympiacos permanent.

On 28 July, Petar Bočkaj joined Pafos on loan from Dinamo Zagreb, with Alef Manga joining on loan from Coritiba the following day.

On 3 August, Pafos announced the signing of Patrick Twumasi from Maccabi Netanya.

On 5 August, Pafos announced the signing of Renato Josipović from Široki Brijeg.

On 14 August, Pafos announced the signing of Adrian Rus from Pisa.

On 20 August, Pafos announced the signing of Matías Melluso from Gimnasia y Esgrima. The following day, 21 August, Pêpê joined Pafos on loan from Olympiacos for the season.

On 22 August, Pafos announced the signing of David Goldar from Burgos.

On 31 January, Pafos announced the signings of Jajá on loan from Athletico Paranaense and Anthony Contreras from Riga.

== Squad ==
As of match played 18 May 2024

No.	Name	Nationality	Position	Date of birth (age)	Signed from	Signed in	Contract ends	Apps.	Goals
Goalkeepers
1	Ivica Ivušić	(Croatia)	GK	1 February 1995 (aged 29)	NK Osijek	2023		61	0
40	Renato Josipović	(Croatia)	GK	12 June 2001 (aged 22)	Široki Brijeg	2023		0	0
Defenders
3	Matías Melluso	(Argentina)	DF	9 June 1998 (aged 25)	Gimnasia y Esgrima	2023		13	0
4	Josef Kvída	(Czech Republic)	DF	16 January 1997 (aged 27)	NEC Nijmegen	2020	2026	135	4
5	David Goldar	(Spain)	DF	15 September 1994 (aged 29)	Burgos	2023		33	4
12	Petar Bočkaj	(Croatia)	DF	23 July 1996 (aged 27)	on loan from Dinamo Zagreb	2023	2024	38	2
13	Jordan Ikoko	(Democratic Republic of the Congo)	DF	3 February 1994 (aged 30)	Ludogorets Razgrad	2022		66	0
14	Marios Demetriou	(Cyprus)	DF	25 December 1992 (aged 31)	PAEEK	2022		26	2
17	Adrian Rus	(Romania)	DF	18 March 1996 (aged 28)	on loan from Pisa	2023		29	2
23	Alexandros Michail	(Cyprus)	DF	28 January 2000 (aged 24)	Karmiotissa	2021		13	0
Midfielders
8	Mamadou Kané	(Guinea)	MF	22 January 1997 (aged 27)	Olympiacos	2023	2026	54	3
24	Onni Valakari	(Finland)	MF	18 August 1999 (aged 24)	Tromsø	2020	2026	151	46
25	Moustapha Name	(Senegal)	MF	5 May 1995 (aged 29)	Paris FC	2022		66	6
30	Vlad Dragomir	(Romania)	MF	24 April 1999 (aged 25)	Virtus Entella	2021		94	8
34	Diogo Dall'Igna	(Brazil)	MF	22 February 2004 (aged 20)	Internacional	2022	2026 (+1)	9	1
88	Pêpê	(Portugal)	MF	20 May 1997 (aged 26)	on loan from Olympiacos	2023	2024	32	2
Forwards
7	Bruno Felipe	(Brazil)	FW	26 May 1994 (aged 29)	Omonia	2023		48	4
9	Matheus Davó	(Brazil)	FW	16 August 1999 (aged 24)	on loan from Cruzeiro	2023	2024	9	2
10	Jairo	(Brazil)	FW	6 May 1992 (aged 32)	Hajduk Split	2021		103	45
18	Magomedkhabib Abdusalamov	(Russia)	FW	1 May 2003 (aged 21)	Rodina Moscow	2021		37	3
19	Anthony Contreras	(Costa Rica)	FW	29 January 2000 (aged 24)	on loan from Riga	2024	2024	16	1
20	Jajá	(Brazil)	FW	15 April 2001 (aged 23)	on loan from Athletico Paranaense	2024	2024	18	3
22	Muamer Tanković	(Sweden)	FW	22 February 1995 (aged 29)	AEK Athens	2022		73	24
27	Patrick Twumasi	(Ghana)	FW	9 May 1994 (aged 30)	Maccabi Netanya	2023		24	3
Out on loan
60	Pedro Pelágio	(Portugal)	MF	21 April 2000 (aged 24)	Marítimo	2023		34	0
	Marcinho	(Brazil)	DF	16 May 1996 (aged 27)	Unattached	2022		0	0
	Khetag Kochiyev	(Russia)	DF	18 December 1999 (aged 23)	Alania Vladikavkaz	2023		0	0
	Thierno Barry	(Guinea)	FW	12 January 2000 (aged 23)	Tenerife B	2023		0	0
Left during the season
2	Jeisson Palacios	(Colombia)	DF	20 March 1994 (aged 30)	Santa Fe	2021		33	2
11	Alef Manga	(Brazil)	FW	29 November 1994 (aged 29)	on loan from Coritiba	2023	2024	6	0
49	Bruno Tavares	(Portugal)	MF	16 April 2002 (aged 22)	Sporting CP	2022		18	0
70	Lysandros Papastylianou	(Cyprus)	FW	29 November 2005 (aged 18)	Academy	2021		3	0
	Oier Olazábal	(Spain)	GK	14 September 1989 (aged 34)	Espanyol	2022		3	0
	Sam Bunch	(Belgium)	DF	15 April 2003 (aged 21)	Europa Point	2023		0	0
	Mattheos Konstantinou	(Cyprus)	DF	3 March 2003 (aged 21)	Academy	2023		0	0
	André Moreira	(Portugal)	DF	5 January 2003 (aged 21)	União de Leiria	2022		0	0

== Transfers ==
=== In ===
Date	Position	Nationality	Name	From	Fee	Ref.
1 July 2023	FW	(Guinea)	Thierno Barry	Tenerife B	Undisclosed	
13 July 2023	MF	(Guinea)	Mamadou Kané	Olympiacos	Undisclosed	
3 August 2023	FW	(Ghana)	Patrick Twumasi	Maccabi Netanya	Undisclosed	
5 August 2023	GK	(Croatia)	Renato Josipović	Široki Brijeg	Undisclosed	
20 August 2023	DF	(Argentina)	Matías Melluso	Gimnasia y Esgrima	Undisclosed	
22 August 2023	DF	(Spain)	David Goldar	Burgos	Undisclosed	

=== Loans in ===
Start date	Position	Nationality	Name	From	End date	Ref.
8 June 2023	FW	(Brazil)	Matheus Davó	Cruzeiro	30 June 2024	
28 July 2023	DF	(Croatia)	Petar Bočkaj	Dinamo Zagreb	30 June 2024	
29 July 2023	FW	(Brazil)	Alef Manga	Coritiba	7 November 2023	
14 August 2023	DF	(Romania)	Adrian Rus	Pisa	Undisclosed	
21 August 2023	MF	(Portugal)	Pêpê	Olympiacos	30 June 2024	
31 January 2024	FW	(Brazil)	Jajá	Athletico Paranaense	30 June 2024	
31 January 2024	FW	(Costa Rica)	Anthony Contreras	Riga	30 June 2024	

=== Out ===
Date	Position	Nationality	Name	To	Fee	Ref.
23 August 2023	DF	(Cyprus)	Mattheos Konstantinou	Akritas Chlorakas	Undisclosed	
24 August 2023	FW	(Cyprus)	Lysandros Papastylianou	Genoa	Undisclosed	
2 September 2023	DF	(Portugal)	André Moreira	Akritas Chlorakas	Undisclosed	
20 September 2023	DF	(Belgium)	Sam Bunch	Akritas Chlorakas	Undisclosed	
28 December 2023	DF	(Colombia)	Jeisson Palacios	América de Cali	Undisclosed	
5 February 2024	MF	(Portugal)	Bruno Tavares	Auda	Undisclosed	

=== Loans out ===
Start date	Position	Nationality	Name	To	End date	Ref.
10 April 2023	DF	(Brazil)	Marcinho	América Mineiro	31 December 2023	
13 September 2023	FW	(Guinea)	Thierno Barry	Akritas Chlorakas	30 June 2024	
22 February 2024	DF	(Brazil)	Marcinho	Rodina Moscow	30 June 2024	
22 February 2024	MF	(Portugal)	Pedro Pelágio	United	30 June 2024	

=== Released ===
Date	Position	Nationality	Name	Joined	Date	Ref
9 July 2023	DF	(Brazil)	Juninho	Zorya Luhansk		
28 August 2023	GK	(Spain)	Oier Olazábal	Andorra	29 August 2023	
3 June 2024	GK	(Croatia)	Renato Josipović	NK Rudeš	20 September 2024	
5 June 2024	DF	(Cyprus)	Alexandros Michail	Nea Salamis Famagusta		
5 June 2024	DF	(Cyprus)	Marios Demetriou	AEK Larnaca		
6 June 2024	FW	(Russia)	Magomedkhabib Abdusalamov	Rodina Moscow	1 July 2024	
30 June 2024	DF	(Brazil)	Marcinho	Ituano	12 July 2024	
30 June 2024	DF	(Democratic Republic of the Congo)	Jordan Ikoko	PAC Omonia 29M	23 December 2024	

== Friendlies ==
13 July 2023	Metta	1–3	Pafos	Latvia
16:00 EEST (UTC+3)	Goal	Report	Valakari; Tanković; Demetriou

19 July 2023	US Sassuolo	2–1	Pafos	Lienz, Austria
18:00 EEST (UTC+3)	Berardi 26'; Defrel 88'	Report	Valakari 14'

22 July 2023	Udinese	2–0	Pafos	Lienz, Austria
16:30 EEST (UTC+3)	Beto 26'; Thauvin 42'	Report

25 July 2023	Al Fateh	1–0	Pafos	Lienz, Austria
19:00 EEST (UTC+3)	Al-Hassan 61'	Report

28 July 2023	Union Berlin	1–2	Pafos	Lienz, Austria
17:00 EEST (UTC+3)	Heintz 49'	Report	Bruno 80'; Abdusalamov 88'

1 August 2023	1. FC Heidenheim	1–1	Pafos	Lienz, Austria
14:00 EEST (UTC+3)	Schimmer 53'	Report	Kvída 77'

6 August 2023	Apollon Limassol	2–1	Pafos	Kolossi
EEST (UTC+3)	(yellow card) 42'; Donyoh 60', 63'	Report	Kvída 72'	Stadium: Alphamega Stadium

11 August 2023	Pafos	2–1	Doxa Katokopias	Paphos
20:00 EEST (UTC+3)	5'; 64'	Report	29'	Stadium: Stelios Kyriakides Stadium

== Competitions ==
=== Overview ===
Competition	First match	Last match	Starting round	Final position	Record							
Competition	First match	Last match	Starting round	Final position	Pld	W	D	L	GF	GA	GD	Win %
Cyta Championship	18 August 2023	11 May 2024	Matchday 1	5th	36	18	8	10	60	33	+27	50.00
Cypriot Cup	18 January 2024	18 May 2024	Second round	Winners	5	4	1	0	12	2	+10	80.00
Total					41	22	9	10	72	35	+37	53.66

Last updated: 18 May 2024
Source: Competitions

=== Cyta Championship ===
==== Regular season ====
===== League table =====
Pos	Team	Pld	W	D	L	GF	GA	GD	Pts	Qualification or relegation
2	Aris Limassol	26	18	2	6	53	21	+32	56	Qualification for the Championship round
3	AEK Larnaca	26	15	7	4	44	26	+18	52	Qualification for the Championship round
4	Pafos	26	15	5	6	48	20	+28	50	Qualification for the Championship round
5	Omonia	26	14	7	5	49	30	+19	49	Qualification for the Championship round
6	Anorthosis Famagusta	26	14	5	7	38	23	+15	47	Qualification for the Championship round

Source: Soccerway
Rules for classification: 1) Points; 2) Head-to-head points; 3) Head-to-head goal difference; 4) Head-to-head goals scored; 5) Head-to-head away goals scored (only if two teams); 6) Goal difference; 7) Goals scored; 8) Play-off (only if deciding championship round, relegation round or relegation).

===== Results summary =====
Overall								Home						Away					
Pld	W	D	L	GF	GA	GD	Pts	W	D	L	GF	GA	GD	W	D	L	GF	GA	GD
26	15	5	6	48	20	+28	50	8	3	2	24	8	+16	7	2	4	24	12	+12

Last updated: 19 February 2024.
Source: Results

===== Results by results =====
Matchday	1	2	3	4	5	6	7	8	9	10	11	12	13	14	15	16	17	18	19	20	21	22	23	24	25	26
Ground	H	H (Note: matchday 3)	A (Note: matchday 4)	H (Note: matchday 5)	A (Note: matchday 2)	A	H	H	A	H	A	H	A	A	H	A	H	A	H	A	A	H	A	H	A	H
Result	W	W	D	W	L	W	D	L	W	W	W	W	W	L	L	W	W	L	W	L	W	D	D	W	W	D
Position	2	4	4	2	3	2	5	6	6	4	2	3	3	4	4	5	4	5	5	6	4	4	4	4	4	4

Updated to match(es) played on 19 February 2024. Source: Results
A = Away; H = Home; W = Win; D = Draw; L = Loss; P = Postponed

===== Results =====
18 August 2023 1	Pafos	3–0	Karmiotissa Polemidion	Paphos
20:00 EEST (UTC+3)	Jairo (yellow card) 32' (goal) 36'; Bočkaj (yellow card) 57'; Dragomir 60'; Twumasi 87'	Report	Ben Sallam (yellow card) 33'; Malone (yellow card) 78'	Stadium: Stelios Kyriakides Stadium; Referee: Andreas Argyrou

2 September 2023 3	Pafos	3–1	AEL Limassol	Paphos
19:00 EEST (UTC+3)	Bočkaj (yellow card) 25' (goal) 51'; Kvída (yellow card) 34'; Bruno (yellow card) 58'; Jairo 72'; Name 90'	Report	Henty 35'; Morsay (yellow card) 42'; Tsouka (yellow card) 49'; Marsh (yellow card) 60'; Filipović (yellow card) 90+6'	Stadium: Stelios Kyriakides Stadium; Referee: Theouli Chrysovalantis

17 September 2023 4	Aris Limassol	1–1	Pafos	Kolossi
19:00 EEST (UTC+3)	Bengtsson 60' (yellow card) 90+2'; Mayambela (yellow card) 76'	Report	Goldar (yellow card) 18'; Dragomir 66'	Stadium: Alphamega Stadium; Referee: Antonio Menelaus

23 September 2023 5	Pafos	4–0	Doxa Katokopias	Paphos
EEST (UTC+3)	Bruno 18', 23'; Tanković 22'; Dragomir (yellow card) 36'; Jairo 52' (pen.); Bočkaj (yellow card) 75'	Report	Nabi (yellow card) 43'; Fofana (yellow card) 45+6'; Kyriakou (yellow card) 55'; Asante (yellow card) 90+1'	Stadium: Stelios Kyriakides Stadium; Referee: Athanasius Sunday

27 September 2023 2	APOEL	1–0	Pafos	Nicosia
19:00 EEST (UTC+3)	Gavriel (yellow card) 11' (yellow-red card) 90+10'; Kostadinov (yellow card) 57'; Crespo (yellow card) 72'; Eduardo 81'; Jefté (yellow card) 83'; Belec (yellow card) 90+4'	Report	Bruno (yellow card) 28'; Bočkaj (yellow card) 49'; Ikoko (yellow card) 61'	Stadium: GSP Stadium; Referee: Ioannis Christodoulou
Note: Match originally scheduled for 26 August 2023.

2 October 2023 6	AEZ Zakakiou	1–4	Pafos	Larnaca
19:00 EEST (UTC+3)	Castro 45+1'; Reynolds (yellow card) 85'	Report	Valakari 9'; Tanković 34'; Jairo 43'; Rus (yellow card) 49'; Ikoko (yellow card) 58'; Davó 83'	Stadium: Ammochostos Stadium; Referee: Mario Christoforou

7 October 2023 7	Pafos	0–0	AEK Larnaca	Paphos
19:00 EEST (UTC+3)	Dragomir (yellow card) 71'; Tanković (yellow card) 80'	Report	Diounkou (yellow card) 32'; Pons (yellow card) 59'	Stadium: Stelios Kyriakides Stadium; Referee: Federico Dionisi

23 October 2023 8	Pafos	0–2	Omonia	Paphos
19:00 EEST (UTC+3)	Pelágio (yellow card) 73'	Report	Bezus 11' (yellow card) 42'; Semedo 16'; Fabiano (yellow card) 76'	Stadium: Stelios Kyriakides Stadium; Referee: Santi Dhia Jirjis Putros

29 October 2023 9	Apollon Limassol	0–3	Pafos	Limassol
19:00 EET (UTC+2)	Kyriakou (red card) 28'	Report	Tanković 21' (pen.); Bruno (yellow card) 30'; Pêpê (yellow card) 34'; Jairo 45+5', 60'; Kvída (yellow card) 46'; Ikoko (yellow card) 80'	Stadium: Alphamega Stadium; Referee: Francesco Fourneau

5 November 2023 10	Pafos	1–0	Anorthosis Famagusta	Paphos
18:00 EET (UTC+2)	Tanković 1'; Kvída (yellow card) 51'; Bočkaj (yellow card) 74'; Ivušić (yellow card) 82'	Report	Wagué (yellow card) 8'; Tejera (yellow card) 50'	Stadium: Stelios Kyriakides Stadium; Referee: Alessandro Prontera

11 November 2023 11	Ethnikos Achna	1–4	Pafos	Achna
19:00 EET (UTC+2)	Elia 12' (pen.); Ristevski (yellow card) 52'	Report	Jairo (yellow card) 11' (goal) 45+6', 63'; Valakari 32' (pen.); Pelágio (yellow card) 50'; Davó 90+2'	Stadium: Dasaki Stadium; Referee: Theouli Chrysovalantis

25 November 2023 12	Pafos	3–0	Othellos Athienou	Paphos
19:00 EET (UTC+2)	Jairo 51'; Twumasi 68'; Dragomir 77'	Report	Jaso (yellow card) 46'; Anang (yellow card) 63'	Stadium: Stelios Kyriakides Stadium; Referee: Andreas Argyrou

3 December 2023 13	Nea Salamis Famagusta	0–2	Pafos	Larnaca
19:00 EET (UTC+2)	Dorregaray (yellow card) 20'; Celea (yellow card) 50'; Carlitos (yellow card) 90+2'	Report	Tanković 58'; Goldar (yellow card) 73'; Jairo 81'	Stadium: Ammochostos Stadium; Referee: Luca Cibelli

10 December 2023 14	Karmiotissa Polemidion	2–1	Pafos	Paphos
18:00 EET (UTC+2)	Rossi (yellow card) 12'; Katsantonis 19', 33'; Tsoukalas (yellow card) 30'; Kovačević (yellow card) 57'; Foor (yellow card) 60'; Theodorou (yellow card) 90+3'	Report	Abdusalamov (yellow card) 50'; Twumasi 90+5'	Stadium: Stelios Kyriakides Stadium; Referee: Athanasius Sunday

17 December 2023 15	Pafos	0–1	APOEL	Paphos
EET (UTC+2)	Pêpê (yellow card) 45+4'; Name (yellow card) 89'	Report	Jefté (yellow card) 5'; Marquinhos (yellow card) 28'; Villafáñez (yellow card) 38'; Chebake 54'; Petrović (yellow card) 85'	Stadium: Stelios Kyriakides Stadium; Referee: Jacob Sundberg

23 December 2023 16	AEL Limassol	1–2	Pafos	Kolossi
17:00 EET (UTC+2)	Gerolemou (yellow card) 5' (goal) 46'; Marsh (yellow card) 90+9'	Report	Name 14'; Bočkaj (yellow card) 27'; Dragomir (yellow card) 55'; Tanković 81'; Jairo (yellow card) 90+8'	Stadium: Alphamega Stadium; Referee: Chrysovalantis Theouli

3 January 2024 17	Pafos	1–0	Aris Limassol	Paphos
19:00 EET (UTC+2)	Goldar (yellow card) 79'; Dragomir 90+6'	Report	Montnor (yellow card) 20'; Szöke (yellow card) 30'	Stadium: Stelios Kyriakides Stadium; Referee: Francesco Fourneau

8 January 2024 18	Doxa Katokopias	1–0	Pafos	Peristerona
19:00 EET (UTC+2)	Antoniades (yellow card) 45+4'; Velkovski 67' (yellow card) 78'; Trujić (yellow card) 85'	Report	Demetriou (yellow card) 37' (yellow-red card) 40'; Pêpê (yellow card) 55'; Melluso (yellow card) 71'; Tanković (yellow card) 78'; Dall'Igna (yellow card) 80'	Stadium: Katokopia Stadium; Referee: Athanasius Sunday

14 January 2024 19	Pafos	4–0	AEZ Zakakiou	Paphos
16:00 EET (UTC+2)	Valakari 21'; Tanković 58'; Dall'Igna 73'; Melluso (yellow card) 81'; Bruno 90+1'	Report	E.Antoniou (red card) 89'	Stadium: Stelios Kyriakides Stadium; Referee: Panagiotis Hadjigeorghiou

22 January 2024 20	AEK Larnaca	1–0	Pafos	Larnaca
19:00 EET (UTC+2)	Sánchez (yellow card) 19'; Tongya (yellow card) 30'; Faraj 85'; Ángel (yellow card) 88'; Pons (yellow card) 90+2'	Report	Melluso (yellow card) 28'; Ikoko (yellow card) 54'; Jairo (yellow card) 90+5'	Stadium: AEK Arena; Referee: Damian Sylwestrzak

27 January 2024 21	Omonia	1–2	Pafos	Strovolos
17:00 EET (UTC+2)	Bezus (yellow card) 12' (goal) 28'; Kakoullis (yellow card) 71'; Coulibaly (red card) 90+4'	Report	Valakari 14'; Kvída (yellow card) 78'; Tanković 87'; Name (yellow card) 90+2'; Rus (yellow card) 90+3'	Stadium: GSP Stadium; Referee: Momilo Marković

31 January 2024 22	Pafos	1–1	Apollon Limassol	Paphos
19:00 EET (UTC+2)	Rus (yellow card) 57' (goal) 89'; Goldar (yellow card) 76'; Tanković (penalty missed) 86'	Report	Marques 28' (yellow card) 82'; Ekpolo (yellow card) 72'	Stadium: Stelios Kyriakides Stadium; Referee: Michael Fabbri

4 February 2024 23	Anorthosis Famagusta	2–2	Pafos	Larnaca
16:00 EET (UTC+2)	Gassama 2'; Chico (yellow card) 16'; Waris (yellow card) 45+1'; Arboleda (yellow card) 79'; Castel 90+9'	Report	Melluso (yellow card) 11'; Jairo 35', 80' (yellow card) 80'; Dragomir (yellow card) 68'; Ivušić (yellow card) 90+8'	Stadium: Antonis Papadopoulos Stadium; Referee: Hélder Miguel Azevedo Malheiro

10 February 2024 24	Pafos	4–3	Ethnikos Achna	Paphos
17:00 EET (UTC+2)	Bočkaj 11'; Jairo 35'; Valakari 47'; Tanković (yellow card) 59' (goal) 89' (pen.); Contreras (yellow card) 90+3'	Report	Dražić (yellow card) 10' (goal) 76'; Lomotey 29'; Cabrera 37'; Peratikos (yellow card) 58'	Stadium: Stelios Kyriakides Stadium; Referee: Chrysovalantis Theouli

13 February 2024 25	Othellos Athienou	0–3	Pafos	Larnaca
19:00 EET (UTC+2)	Šuto (yellow card) 24'	Report	Goldar 17'; Twumasi (yellow card) 30'; Rus 54'; Dragomir (yellow card) 57'; Tanković 62'; Valakari (yellow card) 78'	Stadium: Ammochostos Stadium; Referee: Athanasius Sunday

19 February 2024 26	Pafos	0–0	Nea Salamis Famagusta	Paphos
19:00 EET (UTC+2)	Melluso (yellow card) 24'; Jairo (yellow card) 38'	Report	Ofori (yellow card) 34'; Bejarano (yellow card) 46'; Guanini (yellow card) 47'; Janga (yellow card) 66'	Stadium: Stelios Kyriakides Stadium; Referee: Konstantinos Fotiou

==== Championship round ====
===== League table =====
Pos	Team	Pld	W	D	L	GF	GA	GD	Pts	Qualification
2	AEK Larnaca	36	21	10	5	57	31	+26	73 (Note: Head to head points: APOEL 8, AEK 2.)	Qualification for the Conference League second qualifying round
3	Omonia	36	20	9	7	62	37	+25	69	Qualification for the Conference League second qualifying round
4	Aris Limassol	36	20	5	11	63	34	+29	65	
5	Pafos	36	18	8	10	60	33	+27	62	Qualification for the Europa League first qualifying round (Note: Pafos qualified for the Europa League first qualifying round by winning the 2023–24 Cypriot Cup.)
6	Anorthosis Famagusta	36	15	8	13	46	42	+4	53	

Source: Soccerway
Rules for classification: 1) Points; 2) Head-to-head points; 3) Head-to-head goal difference; 4) Head-to-head goals scored; 5) Head-to-head away goals scored (only if two teams); 6) Goal difference; 7) Goals scored; 8) Play-off (only if deciding championship round, relegation round or relegation).

===== Results summary =====
Overall								Home						Away					
Pld	W	D	L	GF	GA	GD	Pts	W	D	L	GF	GA	GD	W	D	L	GF	GA	GD
10	3	3	4	12	13	−1	12	2	1	2	7	5	+2	1	2	2	5	8	−3

Last updated: 11 May 2024.
Source: Results

===== Results by results =====
Matchday	1	2	3	4	5	6	7	8	9	10
Ground	H	A	A	H	A	A	H	H	A	H
Result	L	L	W	W	D	L	L	W	D	D
Position	5	5	5	5	5	5	5	5	5	5

Updated to match(es) played on 11 May 2024. Source: Results
A = Away; H = Home; W = Win; D = Draw; L = Loss; P = Postponed

===== Results =====
25 February 2024 27	Pafos	0–1	AEK Larnaca	Paphos
19:00 EET (UTC+2)	Jairo (yellow card) 27'; Melluso (yellow card) 76' (yellow-red card) 90+3'	Report	Faraj 44'; Pirić (yellow card) 54'; Gyurcsó (yellow card) 84'; Roberge (yellow card) 90'; García (yellow card) 90+1'	Stadium: Stelios Kyriakides Stadium; Referee: Duje Strukan

3 March 2024 28	APOEL	1–0	Pafos	Nicosia
17:00 EET (UTC+2)	Ndongala 8'; Kvilitaia (yellow card) 60'	Report	Rus (yellow card) 40'; Pêpê (yellow card) 56'; Melluso (yellow card) 90+4'	Stadium: GSP Stadium; Referee: Srđan Jovanović

10 March 2024 29	Anorthosis Famagusta	2–3	Pafos	Larnaca
17:00 EET (UTC+2)	Castel 53'; Gassama 65'; Chico (red card) 87'; Makoun (yellow card) 90+9'; Arboleda (yellow card) 90+11'	Report	Tanković 35' (pen.), 90+11' (pen.); Goldar (yellow card) 75' (goal) 90+16'; Bočkaj (yellow card) 83'	Stadium: Antonis Papadopoulos Stadium; Referee: Miguel Bertolo Nogueira

16 March 2024 30	Pafos	1–0	Aris Limassol	Paphos
19:00 EET (UTC+2)	Tanković 82' (pen.); Bočkaj (yellow card) 90+8'	Report	Urošević (yellow card) 21'; Sané (yellow card) 23'; Bengtsson (yellow card) 81'	Stadium: Stelios Kyriakides Stadium; Referee: Luís Miguel Branco Godinho

31 March 2024 31	Omonia	1–1	Pafos	Strovolos
19:30 EEST (UTC+3)	Simić 45+1'; Bezus (penalty missed) 49'; Coulibaly (yellow card) 57'; Kousoulos (yellow card) 90+3'	Report	Kvída (yellow card) 37'; Dragomir 66'; Pêpê (yellow card) 90'; Rus (yellow card) 90+5'	Stadium: GSP Stadium; Referee: Georgi Kabakov

6 April 2024 32	AEK Larnaca	3–0	Pafos	Larnaca
19:30 EEST (UTC+3)	Kvída 7' (o.g.); Sol 18'; Pons 24'; Diounkou (yellow card) 68'	Report	Pêpê (yellow card) 26'; Kané (yellow card) 33'	Stadium: AEK Arena – Georgios Karapatakis; Referee: Miguel Bertolo Nogueira

14 April 2024 33	Pafos	0–2	APOEL	Paphos
17:00 EEST (UTC+3)	Demetriou (yellow card) 19'	Report	Chebake (yellow card) 21'; Marquinhos (yellow card) 52' (goal) 69'; Kvilitaia 61'	Stadium: Stelios Kyriakides Stadium; Referee: Simone Sozza

21 April 2024 34	Pafos	5–1	Anorthosis Famagusta	Paphos
17:00 EEST (UTC+3)	Jairo 11', 45+2'; Tanković 16'; Rus (yellow card) 18'; Goldar 20'; Jajá 70'	Report	Ferreira 9'; Chrysostomou (yellow card) 21'; Kargas (yellow card) 36'; Makoun (yellow card) 43'; Perea (yellow card) 90+2'	Stadium: Stelios Kyriakides Stadium; Referee: Athanasius Sunday

28 April 2024 35	Aris Limassol	1–1	Pafos	Kolossi
19:00 EEST (UTC+3)	Montnor 25'; Brorsson (yellow card) 47'; Sawo (yellow card) 63'	Report	Jajá 27'; Name (yellow card) 68'	Stadium: Alphamega Stadium; Referee: Antonio Menelaus

11 May 2024 36	Pafos	1–1	Omonia	Paphos
19:00 EEST (UTC+3)	Jairo 65'; Goldar (yellow card) 85'; Bruno (yellow card) 90+4'	Report	Demetriou 15' (o.g.); Miletić (yellow card) 44'	Stadium: Stelios Kyriakides Stadium; Referee: Konstantinos Fellas

=== Cypriot Cup ===
18 January 2024 Second Round	Olympiakos Nicosia	0–1	Pafos	Nicosia
19:00 EET (UTC+2)	Badji (yellow card) 69'	Report	Dall'Igna (yellow card) 35'; Valakari 43' (pen.)	Stadium: Makario Stadium; Referee: Andreas Argyrou

28 February 2024 Quarterfinal	Nea Salamis Famagusta	0–5	Pafos	Larnaca
19:00 EET (UTC+2)	Guanini (yellow card) 27'; Ofori (yellow card) 32'; Durmishaj (yellow card) 45+5'	Report	Contreras 23'; Name (yellow card) 38'; Goldar 45+6'; Jairo 48'; Valakari 67' (pen.); Jajá 86'	Stadium: Ammochostos Stadium; Referee: Rade Obrenović

10 April 2024 Semifinal 1st leg	Pahos	2–1	Apollon Limassol	Paphos
18:00 EEST (UTC+3)	Pêpê 28'; Demetriou 85'	Report	Coll (yellow card) 12'; Peretz (yellow card) 18'; Malekkides 35'; Filiotis (yellow card) 40'; Darikwa (yellow card) 49'; Costache (yellow card) 61'; Peybernes (yellow card) 90+5'	Stadium: Stelios Kyriakides Stadium; Referee: Radu Petrescu

17 April 2024 Semifinal 2nd leg	Apollon Limassol	1–1 (2–3 agg.)	Pahos	Limassol
20:00 EEST (UTC+3)	Sagal 70' (pen.); Kyriakou (yellow card) 90+4'	Report	Valakari (yellow card) 54'; Bočkaj (yellow card) 65'; Tanković 90+4'	Stadium: Alphamega Stadium; Referee: Daniel Siebert

18 May 2024 Final	Omonia	0–3	Pahos	Nicosia
17:00 EEST (UTC+3)	Coulibaly (yellow card) 6' (yellow-red card) 86'	Report	Tanković 8' (pen.); Dragomir 36'; Rodrigues 40'; Jairo (yellow card) 76'; Demetriou (yellow card) 89'	Stadium: GSP Stadium; Referee: Srđan Jovanović

== Squad statistics ==
As of match played 18 May 2024

=== Appearances and goals ===
No.	Pos	Nat	Player	Total		Cyta Championship		Cypriot Cup	
No.	Pos	Nat	Player	Apps	Goals	Apps	Goals	Apps	Goals
1	GK	(Croatia) CRO	Ivica Ivušić	41	0	36	0	5	0
3	DF	(Argentina) ARG	Matías Melluso	13	0	10+2	0	0+1	0
4	DF	(Czech Republic) CZE	Josef Kvída	39	0	31+4	0	4	0
5	DF	(Spain) ESP	David Goldar	33	4	27+2	3	4	1
7	FW	(Brazil) BRA	Bruno Felipe	31	3	16+12	3	1+2	0
8	MF	(Guinea) GUI	Mamadou Kané	17	0	5+10	0	1+1	0
9	FW	(Brazil) BRA	Matheus Davó	9	2	0+9	2	0	0
10	FW	(Brazil) BRA	Jairo	38	17	33	16	5	1
11	FW	(Brazil) BRA	Alef Manga	6	0	5+1	0	0	0
12	DF	(Croatia) CRO	Petar Bočkaj	38	2	27+6	2	5	0
13	DF	(Democratic Republic of the Congo) COD	Jordan Ikoko	30	0	27+1	0	2	0
14	DF	(Cyprus) CYP	Marios Demetriou	14	1	3+9	0	0+2	1
17	DF	(Romania) ROU	Adrian Rus	29	2	20+4	2	5	0
18	FW	(Russia) RUS	Magomedkhabib Abdusalamov	19	0	2+15	0	0+2	0
19	FW	(Costa Rica) CRC	Anthony Contreras	16	1	3+9	0	2+2	1
20	FW	(Brazil) BRA	Jajá	18	3	4+10	2	1+3	1
22	FW	(Sweden) SWE	Muamer Tanković	37	16	28+4	14	4+1	2
23	DF	(Cyprus) CYP	Alexandros Michail	4	0	1+3	0	0	0
24	MF	(Finland) FIN	Onni Valakari	40	7	22+13	5	3+2	2
25	MF	(Senegal) SEN	Moustapha Name	39	2	34	2	3+2	0
27	FW	(Ghana) GHA	Patrick Twumasi	24	3	4+19	3	0+1	0
30	MF	(Romania) ROU	Vlad Dragomir	37	6	33	5	4	1
34	MF	(Brazil) BRA	Diogo Dall'Igna	9	1	0+8	1	1	0
88	MF	(Portugal) POR	Pêpê	32	2	17+10	0	5	2
Players away on loan:
60	MF	(Portugal) POR	Pedro Pelágio	14	0	5+9	0	0	0
Players who appeared for Pafos but left during the season:
49	MF	(Portugal) POR	Bruno Tavares	13	0	3+9	0	0+1	0

=== Goal scorers ===
Place	Position	Nation	Number	Name	Cyta Championship	Cypriot Cup	Total
1	FW	(Brazil)	10	Jairo	16	1	17
2	FW	(Sweden)	22	Muamer Tanković	14	2	16
3	MF	(Finland)	24	Onni Valakari	5	2	7
4	MF	(Romania)	30	Vlad Dragomir	5	1	6
5	DF	(Spain)	5	David Goldar	3	1	4
6	FW	(Ghana)	27	Patrick Twumasi	3	0	3
6	FW	(Brazil)	7	Bruno Felipe	3	0	3
6	FW	(Brazil)	20	Jajá	2	1	3
9	FW	(Brazil)	9	Matheus Davó	2	0	2
9	MF	(Senegal)	25	Moustapha Name	2	0	2
9	DF	(Croatia)	12	Petar Bočkaj	2	0	2
9	DF	(Romania)	17	Adrian Rus	2	0	2
9	MF	(Portugal)	88	Pêpê	0	2	2
14	MF	(Brazil)	34	Diogo Dall'Igna	1	0	1
14	FW	(Costa Rica)	19	Anthony Contreras	0	1	1
14	DF	(Cyprus)	14	Marios Demetriou	0	1	1
Total					60	14	74

=== Clean sheets ===
Place	Position	Nation	Number	Name	Cyta Championship	Cypriot Cup	Total
1	GK	(Croatia)	1	Ivica Ivušić	10	3	13
Total					10	3	13

=== Disciplinary record ===
Number	Nation	Position	Name	Cyta Championship		Cypriot Cup		Total	
Number	Nation	Position	Name	Booked	Sent off (straight red)	Booked	Sent off (straight red)	Booked	Sent off (straight red)
1	(Croatia)	GK	Ivica Ivušić	2	0	0	0	2	0
3	(Argentina)	DF	Matías Melluso	8	1	0	0	8	1
4	(Croatia)	DF	Josef Kvída	5	0	0	0	5	0
5	(Spain)	DF	David Goldar	6	0	0	0	6	0
7	(Brazil)	FW	Bruno Felipe	4	0	0	0	4	0
8	(Guinea)	MF	Mamadou Kané	1	0	0	0	1	0
10	(Brazil)	FW	Jairo	7	0	1	0	8	0
12	(Croatia)	DF	Petar Bočkaj	8	0	1	0	9	0
13	(Democratic Republic of the Congo)	DF	Jordan Ikoko	4	0	0	0	4	0
14	(Cyprus)	DF	Marios Demetriou	3	1	1	0	4	1
17	(Romania)	DF	Adrian Rus	6	0	0	0	6	0
18	(Russia)	FW	Magomedkhabib Abdusalamov	1	0	0	0	1	0
19	(Costa Rica)	FW	Anthony Contreras	1	0	0	0	1	0
22	(Sweden)	FW	Muamer Tanković	3	0	0	0	3	0
24	(Finland)	MF	Onni Valakari	1	0	1	0	2	0
25	(Senegal)	MF	Moustapha Name	3	0	1	0	4	0
27	(Ghana)	FW	Patrick Twumasi	1	0	0	0	1	0
30	(Romania)	MF	Vlad Dragomir	5	0	0	0	5	0
34	(Brazil)	MF	Diogo Dall'Igna	1	0	1	0	2	0
88	(Portugal)	MF	Pêpê	6	0	0	0	6	0
Players away on loan:
60	(Portugal)	MF	Pedro Pelágio	2	0	0	0	2	0
Players who left Pafos during the season:
Total				78	2	6	0	84	2
