= Magomedkhabib Abdusalamov =

Russian footballer (born 2003)

Personal information
- Full name: Magomedkhabib Magomedovich Abdusalamov
- Date of birth: 1 May 2003 (age 23)
- Place of birth: Makhachkala, Russia
- Height: 1.87 m (6 ft 2 in)
- Position: Right winger

Team information
- Current team: Rodina Moscow
- Number: 18

Youth career
- –2019: Rodina Moscow

Senior career*
Years	Team	Apps	(Gls)
2019–2021	Rodina Moscow	34	(11)
2021–2024	Pafos	34	(3)
2022–2023	→ Akritas Chlorakas (loan)	18	(0)
2024–	Rodina Moscow	44	(12)
2024–2025	→ Rodina-2 Moscow	12	(9)

International career^{‡}
2019–2020	Russia U17	7	(3)
2021	Russia U18	5	(2)
- * Club domestic league appearances and goals as of 22 November 2026 ‡ National team caps and goals as of 24 June 2021

Magomedkhabib Magomedovich Abdusalamov (Russian: Магомедхабиб Магомедович Абдусаламов; born 1 May 2003) is a Russian football player who plays as a forward for Rodina Moscow.

== Career ==
Abdusalamov originally considered becoming a wrestler, as his uncle Yusup Abdusalomov is an Olympic silver medalist in freestyle wrestling, before settling on football as his sport and joining the academy of Rodina Moscow. He made his senior debut for Rodina in the third-tier Russian Second League in 2019, before moving to Cyprus, where he played for three seasons. He then returned to Rodina in 2024.

In the latter part of the 2025–26 Russian First League, Abdusalamov became a regular starter for Rodina and contributed to their league-winning campaign and the first-ever promotion to the Russian Premier League.

Abdusalamov made his debut in the Russian Premier League for Rodina on 25 July 2026 in a game against Spartak Moscow. Spartak's manager Juan Carlos Carcedo previously coached Abdusalamov at Pafos.

== Career statistics ==
As of 22 November 2026

Club	Season	League			Cup		Other		Total	
Club	Season	Division	Apps	Goals	Apps	Goals	Apps	Goals	Apps	Goals
Rodina Moscow	2019–20	Russian Second League	13	5	2	0	5 (Note: Appearances in FNL Cup)	0	20	5
Rodina Moscow	2020–21	Russian Second League	21	6	4	2	—		25	8
Rodina Moscow	Total		34	11	6	2	5	0	45	13
Pafos	2021–22	Cypriot First Division	17	3	1	0	—		18	3
Pafos	2023–24	Cypriot First Division	17	0	2	0	—		19	0
Pafos	Total		34	3	3	0	0	0	37	3
Akritas Chlorakas (loan)	2022–23	Cypriot First Division	18	0	1	0	—		19	0
Rodina Moscow	2024–25	Russian First League	14	6	1	1	—		15	7
Rodina Moscow	2025–26	Russian First League	20	6	0	0	—		20	6
Rodina Moscow	2026–27	Russian Premier League	10	0	5	3	—		15	3
Rodina Moscow	Total		44	12	6	4	0	0	50	16
Rodina-2 Moscow	2024–25	Russian Second League A	10	8	—		—		10	8
Rodina-2 Moscow	2025–26	Russian Second League A	1	0	—		—		1	0
Rodina-2 Moscow	2026–27	Russian Second League A	1	1	—		—		1	1
Rodina-2 Moscow	Total		12	9	0	0	0	0	12	9
Career total			142	35	16	6	5	0	163	41

== Honours ==
Pafos

- Cypriot Cup: 2023–24
