= Adrian Rus =

Romanian footballer (born 1996)

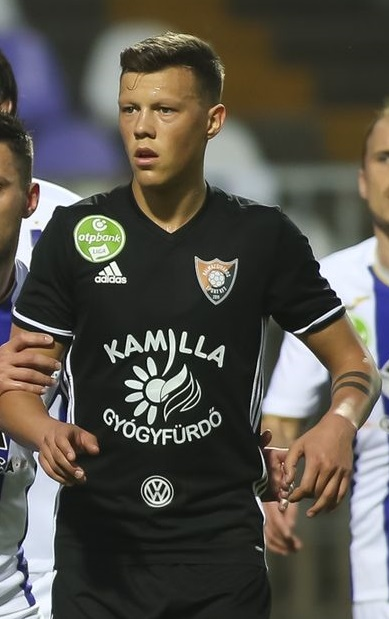
- Rus playing for Balmazújváros in 2018

Personal information
- Date of birth: 18 March 1996 (age 30)
- Place of birth: Satu Mare, Romania
- Height: 1.88 m (6 ft 2 in)
- Position: Centre-back

Team information
- Current team: Universitatea Craiova
- Number: 28

Youth career
- –2010: LPS Satu Mare
- 2010–2014: Olimpia Satu Mare

Senior career*
Years	Team	Apps	(Gls)
2014–2015	Olimpia Satu Mare	25	(0)
2015–2016	Fehérgyarmat	14	(0)
2016–2018	Balmazújváros	61	(3)
2018–2019	Puskás Akadémia	0	(0)
2018–2019	→ Sepsi OSK (loan)	14	(0)
2019–2022	Fehérvár	57	(1)
2022–2025	Pisa	41	(2)
2023–2024	→ Pafos (loan)	24	(2)
2025–	Universitatea Craiova	29	(2)

International career^{‡}
2018–2019	Romania U21	7	(0)
2019–	Romania	23	(2)
- * Club domestic league appearances and goals as of 23 August 2026 ‡ National team caps and goals as of 6 June 2026

Adrian Rus (born 18 March 1996) is a Romanian professional footballer who plays as a centre-back for Liga I club Universitatea Craiova and the Romania national team.

== Club career ==
Rus started his career as a senior in 2014 with hometown side Olimpia Satu Mare, before moving to Hungary the following year and representing Fehérgyarmat, Balmazújváros and Puskás Akadémia.

The latter team loaned him out for the 2018–19 season to Sepsi OSK in his native country. On 25 June 2019, Rus continued in Hungary and its Nemzeti Bajnokság I by signing for Fehérvár.

On 1 August 2022, Rus signed a four-year contract with Italian team Pisa. On 14 August 2023, Rus was loaned to Pafos in Cyprus, with an option to buy.

== International career ==
Rus was selected in the Romania under-21 squad for the 2019 UEFA European Championship, recording one appearance as his team was eliminated by defending champions Germany in the semi-finals.

After the conclusion of the under-21 tournament, Rus received his first call-up to the Romania senior team, and on 8 September 2019 started in a 1–0 victory over Malta counting for the Euro 2020 qualification.

== Personal life ==
Born in Satu Mare, near the Romanian border with Hungary, Rus acquired citizenship of the latter country and was eligible for its national team. He however stated in a 2019 interview for the Romanian Football Federation that feels "100% Romanian" and desires to represent his country of birth.

== Career statistics ==
=== Club ===
As of match played 5 November 2026

Appearances and goals by club, season and competition
Club	Season	League			National cup (Note: Includes Magyar Kupa, Cupa României, Coppa Italia, Cypriot Cup)		Europe		Other		Total	
Club	Season	Division	Apps	Goals	Apps	Goals	Apps	Goals	Apps	Goals	Apps	Goals
Olimpia Satu Mare	2014–15	Liga II	25	0	0	0	—		—		25	0
Fehérgyarmat	2015–16	Nemzeti Bajnokság III	14	0	0	0	—		—		14	0
Balmazújváros	2015–16	Nemzeti Bajnokság II	2	0	0	0	—		—		2	0
Balmazújváros	2016–17	Nemzeti Bajnokság II	29	1	1	0	—		—		30	1
Balmazújváros	2017–18	Nemzeti Bajnokság I	30	2	4	0	—		—		34	2
Balmazújváros	Total		61	3	5	0	—		—		66	3
Sepsi OSK (loan)	2018–19	Liga I	14	0	3	1	—		—		17	1
Fehérvár	2019–20	Nemzeti Bajnokság I	11	0	3	0	0	0	—		14	0
Fehérvár	2020–21	Nemzeti Bajnokság I	20	1	6	0	1 (Note: Appearance in UEFA Europa League)	0	—		27	1
Fehérvár	2021–22	Nemzeti Bajnokság I	26	0	2	0	0	0	—		28	0
Fehérvár	2022–23	Nemzeti Bajnokság I	0	0	—		1 (Note: Appearance in UEFA Conference League)	0	—		1	0
Fehérvár	Total		57	1	11	0	2	0	—		70	1
Pisa	2022–23	Serie B	16	0	0	0	—		—		16	0
Pisa	2024–25	Serie B	25	2	1	0	—		—		26	2
Pisa	Total		41	2	1	0	—		—		42	2
Pafos (loan)	2023–24	Cypriot First Division	24	2	5	0	—		—		29	2
Universitatea Craiova	2025–26	Liga I	26	2	3	2	5	0	—		34	4
Universitatea Craiova	2026–27	Liga I	3	0	0	0	8 (Note: Four appearances in UEFA Champions League, three appearances in UEFA Europa League, one appearance in UEFA Conference League)	1	1 (Note: Appearance in Supercupa României)	0	12	1
Universitatea Craiova	Total		29	2	3	2	13	1	1	0	46	5
Career total			265	10	28	3	15	1	1	0	309	14

=== International ===
As of match played 6 June 2026

Appearances and goals by national team and year
National team	Year	Apps	Goals
Romania
Romania	2019	5	0
Romania	2020	0	0
Romania	2021	5	0
Romania	2022	7	1
Romania	2023	2	0
Romania	2024	3	0
Romania	2025	0	0
Romania	2026	1	1
Total		23	2

Scores and results list Romania's goal tally first, score column indicates score after each Rus goal.

List of international goals scored by Adrian Rus
No.	Date	Venue	Opponent	Score	Result	Competition
1	20 November 2022	Zimbru Stadium, Chișinău, Moldova	Moldova	5–0	5–0	Friendly
2	6 June 2026	Stadionul Steaua, Bucharest, Romania	Wales	2–1	2–1	Friendly

== Honours ==
Fehérvár

- Magyar Kupa runner-up: 2020–21

Pafos

- Cypriot Cup: 2023–24

Universitatea Craiova

- Liga I: 2025–26
- Cupa României: 2025–26
- Supercupa României: 2026
