= Ecija (disambiguation) =

Écija is a city in Andalusia, Spain.

Ecija may also refer to:

== Places ==
- Nueva Ecija, a province in Luzon, Philippines, named after the Spanish city

== People ==
- Daniel Écija (born 1963), Spanish television producer and screenwriter
- Ecija Ivušić (born 1986), Croatian television and radio presenter
- Ecija Ojdanić (born 1974), Croatian actress

== See also ==
- Battle of Écija, several battles
- Écija Balompié, a football team based in Écija, Spain
