= Ivušić =

Ivušić is a surname. Notable people with the surname include:

- Ecija Ivušić (born 1986), Croatian television and radio presenter
- Ivica Ivušić (born 1995), Croatian footballer
