= Josef Kvída =

Czech footballer (born 1997)

Personal information
- Date of birth: 16 January 1997 (age 29)
- Place of birth: Příbram, Czech Republic
- Height: 1.96 m (6 ft 5 in)
- Position: Centre back

Team information
- Current team: Apollon Limassol
- Number: 44

Youth career
- –2015: Příbram
- 2015–: Zwolle

Senior career*
Years	Team	Apps	(Gls)
2015	Příbram	0	(0)
2015–2018	Zwolle	2	(0)
2017–2018	→ Almere City (loan)	24	(1)
2018–2020	NEC	62	(5)
2020–2025	Pafos	124	(4)
2025–	Apollon Limassol	46	(5)

International career
2014	Czech Republic U17	1	(0)
2014–2015	Czech Republic U18	11	(0)
2015–2016	Czech Republic U19	9	(0)
2016–2017	Czech Republic U20	6	(1)
- * Club domestic league appearances and goals as of 14 June 2026

Josef Kvída (born 16 January 1997) is a Czech professional footballer who plays as a defender for Cypriot club Apollon Limassol.

== Club career ==
After starting his career with Příbram, Kvida joined Dutch side PEC Zwolle in July 2015. On 3 December 2016, after appearing on the substitutes bench for PEC Zwolle multiple times, Kvida finally made his debut in a 3–1 away defeat against Vitesse, playing the full 90 minutes. On 17 August 2017, Kvída was sent on loan to Almere City. On 4 July 2018, it was announced he had joined Eerste Divisie side NEC on a free transfer.

== Career statistics ==
As of match played 25 July 2026

Appearances and goals by club, season and competition
Club	Season	League			Cup		Continental		Other		Total	
Club	Season	Division	Apps	Goals	Apps	Goals	Apps	Goals	Apps	Goals	Apps	Goals
Zwolle	2016–17	Eredivisie	2	0	0	0	—		—		2	0
Almere City (loan)	2017–18	Eerste Divisie	24	1	2	0	—		—		26	1
NEC	2018–19	Eerste Divisie	35	3	2	0	—		—		37	3
NEC	2019–20	Eerste Divisie	27	2	1	0	—		—		28	2
NEC	Total		62	5	3	0	—		—		65	5
Pafos	2020–21	Cypriot First Division	28	1	0	0	—		—		28	1
Pafos	2021–22	Cypriot First Division	27	1	1	0	—		—		28	1
Pafos	2022–23	Cypriot First Division	34	2	6	0	—		—		40	2
Pafos	2023–24	Cypriot First Division	35	0	4	0	—		—		39	0
Pafos	2024–25	Cypriot First Division	0	0	0	0	1	0	0	0	1	0
Pafos	Total		124	4	11	0	1	0	0	0	136	4
Apollon Limassol	2024–25	Cypriot First Division	12	0	0	0	—		—		12	0
Apollon Limassol	2025–26	Cypriot First Division	34	5	5	0	—		—		39	5
Apollon Limassol	2026–27	Cypriot First Division	0	0	0	0	1	0	—		1	0
Apollon Limassol	Total		46	5	5	0	1	0	0	0	52	5
Career total			258	15	21	0	2	0	0	0	281	15

== Honours ==
Pafos

- Cypriot Cup: 2023–24
