= Jairo (footballer, born 1992) =

Brazilian footballer

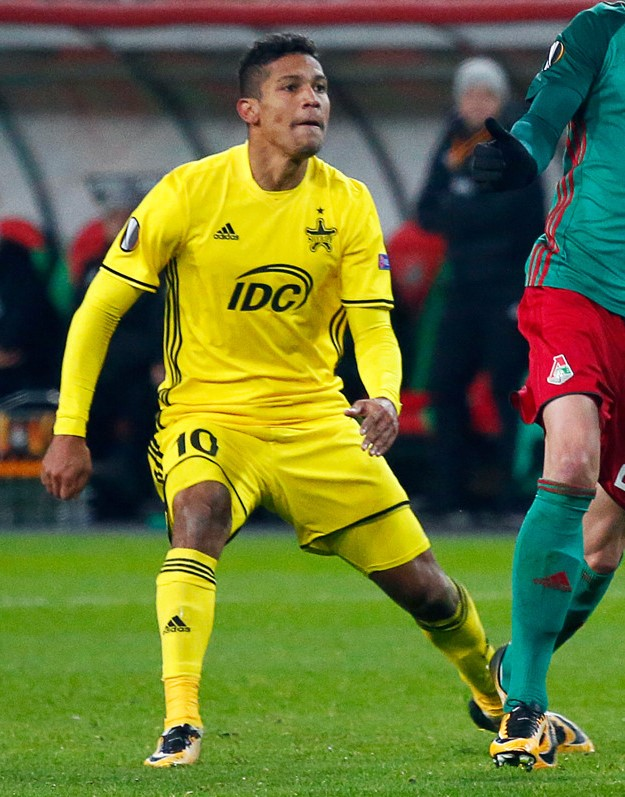
- Jairo in 2017

Personal information
- Full name: Jairo de Macedo da Silva
- Date of birth: 6 May 1992 (age 34)
- Place of birth: São João de Meriti, Brazil
- Height: 1.81 m (5 ft 11 in)
- Position: Forward

Team information
- Current team: Johor Darul Ta'zim
- Number: 11

Youth career
- Botafogo

Senior career*
Years	Team	Apps	(Gls)
2010–2013	Madureira	37	(4)
2011	→ Internacional (loan)	0	(0)
2011	→ Botafogo (loan)	2	(1)
2013–2015	Trenčín	38	(10)
2015–2018	PAOK	15	(1)
2016–2017	→ PAS Giannina (loan)	26	(3)
2017–2018	→ Sheriff Tiraspol (loan)	14	(5)
2018–2021	Hajduk Split	96	(23)
2021–2025	Pafos	128	(54)
2025–	Johor Darul Ta'zim	14	(12)
- * Club domestic league appearances and goals as of 14 January 2026

Jairo de Macedo da Silva (born 6 May 1992), or simply Jairo, is a Brazilian professional footballer who plays as a forward for Malaysia Super League club Johor Darul Ta'zim.

== Club career ==
Jairo started off career in the Brazilian club Botafogo. He came to AS Trenčín in winter 2014, and he signed one-year contract. Jairo came to Trenčín from Brazilian Madureira. The club started to scout him during Copa Amsterdam, where he was playing for Botafogo. In the beginning of 2015, he signed a three-year contract with Trenčín. In the 2nd qualifying round of the UEFA Champions League against Steaua Bucharest, he assisted with all three goals in a 3–2 away win.

On 8 August 2015, PAOK announced the signing of Jairo from AS Trenčín for a reported fee of €400,000. Jairo put pen to paper on a four-year contract. On 3 December 2015, in a 6–2 away win against Chania for Greek Cup he scored his first goal with the club. On 10 January 2016, he scored his first league goal with the club in a 3–1 home win game against PAS Giannina.

On 30 August 2016, he signed with PAS Giannina on a year-long loan from PAOK. On 8 August 2017, he was loaned to Sheriff Tiraspol, signing an 1-year contract. On 23 September 2017, his hat-trick in a 6–3 home win against Dacia helped his club to keep the 1st place in the league.

Jairo joined Croatian side Hajduk Split for the 2018–19 Croatian First Football League season, collecting 13 goals and 10 assists in all competitions. At the end of the season, he was named in the league Team of the Season. On 12 June 2019, Jairo extended his contract for a further three years.

On 15 June 2025, Jairo was announced as the newest signing for the Malaysia Super League club Johor Darul Ta'zim. In the opening match of the 2025–26 season on 8 August 2025, he scored the opening goal in the 1st minute of the match on his debut for the club.

== Career statistics ==
As of match played 24 May 2025

Club	Season	League			National cup (Note: Includes Slovak Cup, Greek Football Cup, Moldovan Cup, Croatian Cup, Cypriot Cup)		Continental		Other		Total	
Club	Season	Division	Apps	Goals	Apps	Goals	Apps	Goals	Apps	Goals	Apps	Goals
Trenčín	2013–14	Slovak First League	8	1	—		—		—		8	1
Trenčín	2014–15	Slovak First League	27	9	5	3	2 (Note: Appearances in UEFA Champions League)	1	—		34	13
Trenčín	2015–16	Slovak First League	3	0	0	0	2	0	—		5	0
Trenčín	Total		38	10	5	3	4	1	—		47	14
PAOK	2015–16	Super League Greece	15	1	4	1	3 (Note: Appearances in UEFA Europa League)	0	—		22	2
PAS Giannina (loan)	2016–17	Super League Greece	26	3	3	1	—		—		29	4
Sheriff Tiraspol (loan)	2017	Divizia Naţională	12	5	—		8	1	—		20	6
Sheriff Tiraspol (loan)	2018	Divizia Naţională	2	0	—		—		—		2	0
Sheriff Tiraspol (loan)	Total		14	5	—		8	1	—		22	6
Hajduk Split	2018–19	Prva HNL	35	13	2	0	1	0	—		38	13
Hajduk Split	2019–20	Prva HNL	33	9	2	1	2	0	—		37	10
Hajduk Split	2020–21	Prva HNL	24	1	3	2	2	0	—		29	3
Hajduk Split	2021–22	Prva HNL	4	0	—		2 (Note: Appearances in UEFA Europa Conference League)	0	—		6	0
Hajduk Split	Total		96	23	7	3	7	0	—		110	26
Pafos	2021–22	Cypriot First Division	30	8	2	0	—		—		32	8
Pafos	2022–23	Cypriot First Division	29	18	4	2	—		—		33	20
Pafos	2023–24	Cypriot First Division	33	16	5	1	—		—		38	17
Pafos	2024–25	Cypriot First Division	35	12	5	1	18	1	1 (Note: Appearance in Cypriot Super Cup)	0	59	14
Pafos	Total		127	54	16	4	18	1	1	0	162	59
Career total			281	84	30	11	22	2	0	0	333	97

== Honours ==
AS Trenčín

- Slovak First Football League: 2014–15
- Slovak Cup: 2014–15

Sheriff Tiraspol

- Moldovan National Division: 2017

Pafos

- Cypriot First Division: 2024–25
- Cypriot Cup: 2023–24

Johor Darul Ta'zim

- Malaysia Charity Shield: 2025

Individual

- Cypriot First Division Top scorer: 2022–23
