= Marios Dimitriou =

Cypriot footballer (born 1990)

Personal information
- Date of birth: 25 December 1992 (age 33)
- Place of birth: Nicosia, Cyprus
- Height: 1.72 m (5 ft 8 in)
- Position: Right back

Team information
- Current team: Ethnikos Achna FC
- Number: 14

Youth career
- Omonia

Senior career*
| Years | Team | Apps | (Gls) |
| 2012–2019 | Omonia | 40 | (0) |
| 2013–2014 | → Alki Larnaca (loan) | 24 | (4) |
| 2018–2019 | → Ermis Aradippou (loan) | 5 | (0) |
| 2019–2020 | Nea Salamina | 0 | (0) |
| 2020–2022 | PAEEK | 35 | (1) |
| 2022–2024 | Pafos | 21 | (0) |
| 2024–2025 | AEK Larnaca | 1 | (0) |
| 2025- | Ethnikos Achna | 11 | (0) |

International career^{‡}
| 2014 | Cyprus U21 | 1 | (0) |
| 2021– | Cyprus | 3 | (0) |
- * Club domestic league appearances and goals as of 14 June 2026 ‡ National team caps and goals as of 9 January 2022

Marios Dimitriou (Greek: Μάριος Δημητρίου; born 25 December 1990) is a Cypriot professional football who plays as a right back for Cypriot First Division club AEK Larnaca.

== Club career ==
=== Omonia Nicosia ===
Dimitriou joined Omonia's academies at age seven. He made his first first-team appearance on 24 November 2012 for the senior squad during the 2012–13 season in a home win 4–2 against AEP Paphos, replacing Georgios Efrem in the 89th minute.

On 8 July 2017, he signed a contract renewal until the summer of 2020.

==== Loan to Alki Larnaca ====
In 2013–2014, Dimitriou was given on loan to Alki.

==== Loan to Ermis Aradippou ====
On 30 June 2018, Dimitriou joined Ermis Aradippou on loan until the end of the season.

=== Nea Salamina ===
On 31 August 2019, Dimitriou signed for one-year contract until June 2020 with Cypriot First Division club Nea Salamina.

=== PAEEK ===
On 21 July 2020, Dimitriou signed for Cypriot club PAEEK until June 2021. In August 2021, PAEEK announced the renewal of his contract until 2022.

== International career ==
He made his debut for the Cyprus national team on 11 October 2021 in a World Cup qualifier against Malta.

== Career statistics ==
As of 31 May 2024

Appearances and goals by club, season and competition
| Club | Season | League | | | Cypriot Cup | | Europe | | Other | | Total | |
| Club | Season | Division | Apps | Goals | Apps | Goals | Apps | Goals | Apps | Goals | Apps | Goals |
|---|---|---|---|---|---|---|---|---|---|---|---|---|
| AC Omonia | 2012–13 | Cypriot First Division | 1 | 0 | — | | — | | — | | 1 | 0 |
| AC Omonia | 2014–15 | Cypriot First Division | 10 | 0 | 3 | 0 | — | | — | | 13 | 0 |
| AC Omonia | 2015–16 | Cypriot First Division | 4 | 0 | 1 | 0 | 2 | 0 | — | | 7 | 0 |
| AC Omonia | 2016–17 | Cypriot First Division | 10 | 0 | — | | — | | — | | 10 | 0 |
| AC Omonia | 2017–18 | Cypriot First Division | 15 | 0 | — | | — | | — | | 15 | 0 |
| Total | | | 40 | 0 | 4 | 0 | 2 | 0 | — | | 46 | 0 |
| Alki (loan) | 2013–14 | Cypriot First Division | 23 | 2 | 4 | 1 | — | | — | | 27 | 3 |
| Ermis (loan) | 2018–19 | Cypriot First Division | 5 | 0 | — | | — | | — | | 5 | 0 |
| Nea Salamina | 2019–20 | Cypriot First Division | — | | — | | — | | — | | — | |
| PAEEK | 2020–21 | Cypriot Second Division | 23 | 0 | — | | — | | — | | 23 | 0 |
| PAEEK | 2021–22 | Cypriot First Division | 20 | 1 | 1 | 0 | — | | — | | 21 | 1 |
| Pafos FC | 2022–23 | Cypriot First Division | 8 | 0 | 3 | 1 | — | | — | | 11 | 1 |
| Pafos FC | 2023–24 | Cypriot First Division | 12 | 0 | 2 | 1 | — | | — | | 14 | 1 |
| Career total | | | 131 | 3 | 14 | 3 | 2 | 0 | 0 | 0 | 147 | 6 |

== Honours ==
Omonia

- Cypriot Super Cup: 2012

PAEEK

- Cypriot Second Division: 2020–21

Pafos

- Cypriot Cup: 2023–24

AEK Larnaca

- Cypriot Cup: 2024–25
