= Ivica Ivušić =

Croatian footballer

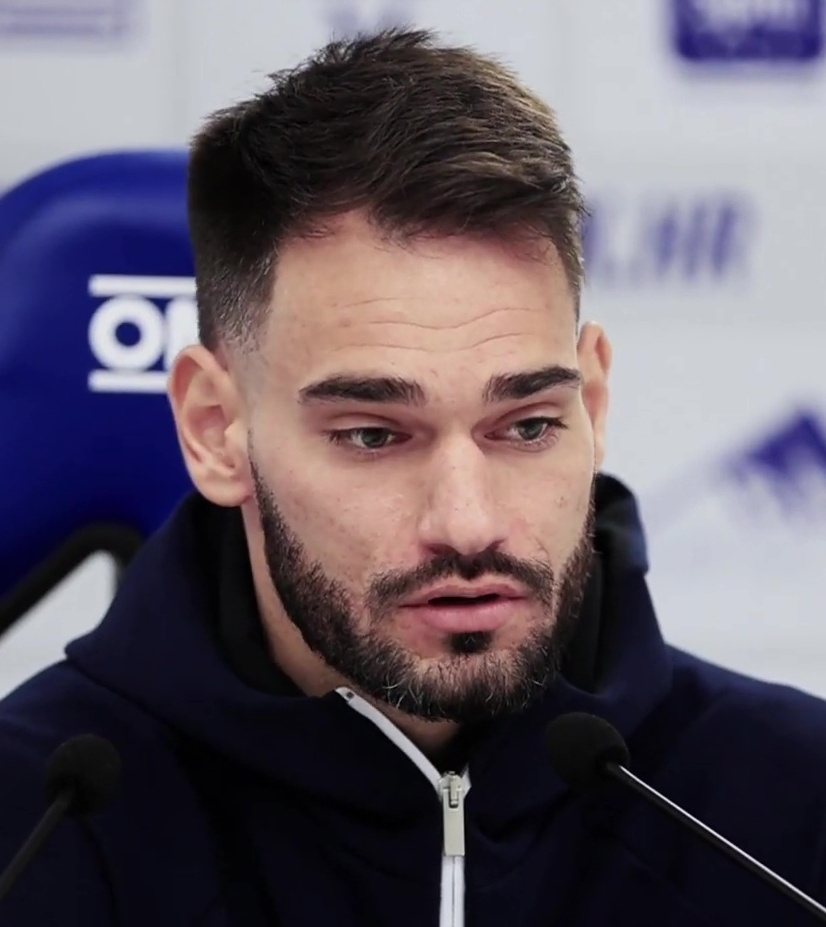
- Ivušić in 2022

Personal information
- Full name: Ivica Ivušić
- Date of birth: 1 February 1995 (age 31)
- Place of birth: Rijeka, Croatia
- Height: 1.95 m (6 ft 5 in)
- Position: Goalkeeper

Team information
- Current team: Hajduk Split
- Number: 1

Youth career
- 2001–2009: Rijeka
- 2009–2014: Inter Milan
- 2011: → Seregno (loan)

Senior career*
Years	Team	Apps	(Gls)
2014–2015	Inter Milan	0	(0)
2014–2015	→ Prato (loan)	11	(0)
2015–2018	Istra 1961	44	(0)
2018	Olympiacos	0	(0)
2018–2023	Osijek	114	(0)
2023–2025	Pafos	79	(0)
2025–	Hajduk Split	15	(0)

International career
2009	Croatia U14	2	(0)
2010	Croatia U15	3	(0)
2010	Croatia U16	1	(0)
2010–2011	Croatia U17	6	(0)
2013	Croatia U19	1	(0)
2015	Croatia U20	2	(0)
2021–2025	Croatia	6	(0)
Medal record
Men's football
Representing Croatia
FIFA World Cup
Third place	2022 Qatar
UEFA Nations League
Runner-up	2023 Netherlands
- * Club domestic league appearances and goals as of 15 June 2026

Ivica Ivušić (born 1 February 1995) is a Croatian professional footballer who plays as a goalkeeper for Croatian Football League club Hajduk Split.

== Club career ==
Born in Rijeka, Ivušić started his youth career with local club Rijeka. He spent eight years with the academy before signing for Internazionale academy in 2009. In July 2014, he was loaned off to Lega Pro club Prato. On 30 August 2014, he made his debut against San Marino Calcio. He later joined Prva HNL side Istra 1961 on 17 August 2015. On 18 January 2018, Greek club Olympiacos announced the signing of Ivušić for an undisclosed fee.

On 12 June 2018, Ivušić returned to Croatia and joined NK Osijek on a four-year contract.

He now plays for Pafos.

== International career ==
On 17 May 2021, Ivušić was named in the preliminary 34-man squad for the UEFA Euro 2020, but did not make the final 26. He made his debut for the Croatia national team on 4 September 2021 in a World Cup qualifier against Slovakia, keeping a clean sheet in a 1–0 away victory.

On 9 November 2022, Ivušić was named in Zlatko Dalić's 26-man squad for the 2022 FIFA World Cup, where he remained an unused substitute as Croatia finished third.

== Career statistics ==
=== Club ===
As of match played 24 May 2026

Appearances and goals by club, season and competition
Club	Season	League			National cup (Note: Includes Coppa Italia, Croatian Cup, Cypriot Cup)		Continental		Other		Total	
Club	Season	Division	Apps	Goals	Apps	Goals	Apps	Goals	Apps	Goals	Apps	Goals
Prato	2014–15	Serie C	11	0	1	0	—		—		12	0
Istra 1961	2015–16	Prva HNL	5	0	0	0	—		—		5	0
Istra 1961	2016–17	Prva HNL	22	0	2	0	—		—		24	0
Istra 1961	2017–18	Prva HNL	15	0	0	0	—		—		15	0
Istra 1961	Total		42	0	2	0	—		—		44	0
Olympiacos	2017–18	Super League Greece	0	0	0	0	0	0	—		0	0
Osijek	2018–19	Prva HNL	0	0	0	0	—		—		0	0
Osijek	2019–20	Prva HNL	36	0	3	0	2 (Note: Appearance(s) in UEFA Europa League)	0	—		41	0
Osijek	2020–21	Prva HNL	36	0	1	0	1	0	—		38	0
Osijek	2021–22	Prva HNL	26	0	1	0	4 (Note: Appearances in UEFA Conference League)	0	—		31	0
Osijek	2022–23	Prva HNL	16	0	0	0	2	0	—		18	0
Osijek	Total		114	0	5	0	9	0	—		128	0
Pafos	2022–23	Cypriot First Division	16	0	4	0	—		—		20	0
Pafos	2023–24	Cypriot First Division	36	0	5	0	—		—		41	0
Pafos	2024–25	Cypriot First Division	27	0	5	0	17 (Note: Two appearances in UEFA Europa League, fifteen appearances in UEFA Conference League)	0	1 (Note: Appearance in Cypriot Super Cup)	0	50	0
Pafos	Total		79	0	14	0	17	0	1	0	111	0
Hajduk Split	2025–26	HNL	15	0	0	0	4	0	—		19	0
Career total			263	0	23	0	30	0	1	0	314	0

=== International ===
Appearances and goals by national team and year
National team	Year	Apps	Goals
Croatia	2021	2	0
Croatia	2022	3	0
Croatia	2023	0	0
Croatia	2024	1	0
Croatia	2025	0	0
Total		6	0

== Honours ==
Pafos

- Cypriot First Division: 2024–25
- Cypriot Cup: 2023–24

Croatia

- FIFA World Cup third place: 2022
- UEFA Nations League runner-up: 2022–23
- FIFA Series: 2024 (ACUD Cup)

Individual

- FIFA Series Best Goalkeeper: 2024 (ACUD Cup)
