= Jajá (footballer, born 2001) =

Brazilian footballer

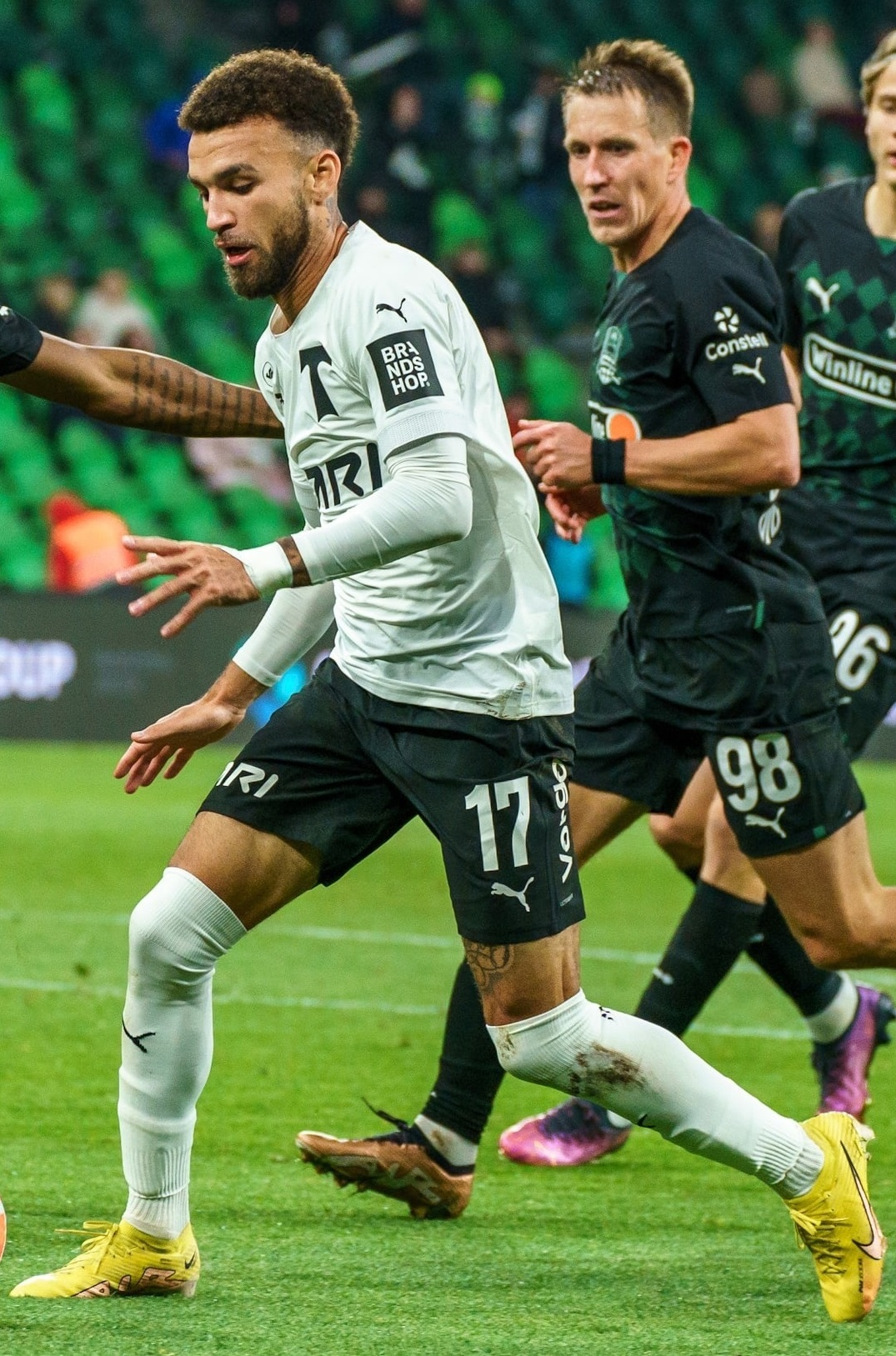
- Jajá with Torpedo Moscow in 2023

Personal information
- Full name: Jair Diego Alves de Brito
- Date of birth: 15 April 2001 (age 25)
- Place of birth: Catanduva, Brazil
- Height: 1.80 m (5 ft 11 in)
- Position: Winger

Team information
- Current team: Pafos
- Number: 11

Youth career
- 2017–2019: Grêmio Novorizontino
- 2019: → Athletico Paranaense (loan)

Senior career*
Years	Team	Apps	(Gls)
2020–2025	Athletico Paranaense	23	(5)
2021	→ CRB (loan)	25	(3)
2022	→ Cruzeiro (loan)	19	(4)
2023	→ Torpedo Moscow (loan)	7	(0)
2023–2024	→ Casa Pia (loan)	12	(0)
2024–2025	→ Pafos (loan)	43	(7)
2025–	Pafos	28	(4)

International career
2020	Brazil U-20	3	(1)
- * Club domestic league appearances and goals as of 18:24, 16 May 2026 (UTC)

Jair Diego Alves de Brito (born 15 April 2001), commonly known as Jajá, is a Brazilian professional footballer who plays as a winger for Cypriot First Division club Pafos.

== Club career ==
On 19 February 2023, Jajá joined Russian Premier League club Torpedo Moscow on loan.

On 31 January 2024, Jajá's loan at Primeira Liga club Casa Pia was cut short as he was instead loaned to Cypriot First Division side Pafos. On 27 June 2025, Pafos announced the permanent signing of Jajá from Athletico Paranaense, on a contract until the summer of 2028.

In the 2025–26 UEFA Champions League qualifying, Jajá scored the decisive goal in Pafos' 1–0 away victory over Maccabi Tel Aviv, securing a 2–1 aggregate win and progression to the third round. Later, in the play-off round, he struck a late equalizer in a 1–1 draw against Red Star Belgrade, a crucial goal that sealed a 3–2 win on aggregate and Pafos' historic qualification for their first-ever Champions League league phase.

== Personal life ==
Jajá is the son of a footballer also nicknamed Jajá.

== Career statistics ==
As of 30 July 2026

Appearances and goals by club, season and competition
Club	Season	League			State league (Note: Includes Campeonato Paranaense)		National cup (Note: Includes Copa do Brasil, Taça de Portugal, Cypriot Cup)		Continental		Other		Total	
Club	Season	Division	Apps	Goals	Apps	Goals	Apps	Goals	Apps	Goals	Apps	Goals	Apps	Goals
Athletico Paranaense	2020	Série A	1	0	9	3	—		1 (Note: Appearance in Copa Libertadores)	0	0	0	11	3
Athletico Paranaense	2021	Série A	0	0	9	1	0	0	0	0	—		9	1
Athletico Paranaense	2022	Série A	—		—		0	0	0	0	—		0	0
Athletico Paranaense	2023	Série A	—		4	1	—		—		—		4	1
Athletico Paranaense	Total		1	0	22	5	0	0	1	0	0	0	24	5
CRB (loan)	2021	Série B	25	3	—		2	0	—		1 (Note: Appearance in Copa do Nordeste)	0	28	3
Cruzeiro (loan)	2022	Série B	19	4	—		2	0	—		—		21	4
Torpedo Moscow (loan)	2022–23	Russian Premier League	7	0	—		0	0	—		—		7	0
Casa Pia (loan)	2023–24	Primeira Liga	12	0	—		2	0	—		0	0	14	0
Pafos (loan)	2023–24	Cypriot First Division	14	2	—		4	1	—		—		18	3
Pafos (loan)	2024–25	Cypriot First Division	29	5	—		3	0	16 (Note: Two appearances in UEFA Europa League, fourteen appearances and four goals in UEFA Conference League)	4	1 (Note: Appearance in Cypriot Super Cup)	0	49	9
Pafos (loan)	Total		43	7	—		7	1	16	4	1	0	67	12
Pafos	2025–26	Cypriot First Division	28	4	—		4	4	13 (Note: Appearances in UEFA Champions League)	2	1	0	46	10
Pafos	2026–27	Cypriot First Division	0	0	—		0	0	2 (Note: Appearances in UEFA Europa League)	0	—		2	0
Pafos	Total		28	4	—		4	4	15	2	1	0	48	10
Career Total			135	18	22	5	17	5	32	6	3	0	209	33

== Honours ==
Athletico Paranaense

- Campeonato Paranaense: 2020

Pafos

- Cypriot First Division: 2024–25
- Cypriot Cup: 2023–24, 2025–26
- Cypriot Super Cup: 2026
