= Pedro Rodrigues (footballer) =

Portuguese footballer (born 1997)

Pêpê Rodrigues
Personal information
- Full name: Pedro Filipe Figueiredo Rodrigues
- Date of birth: 20 May 1997 (age 29)
- Place of birth: Sátão, Portugal
- Height: 1.83 m (6 ft 0 in)
- Position: Midfielder

Team information
- Current team: Pafos
- Number: 88

Youth career
- 2005–2006: Ferreira de Aves
- 2007–2008: Académico Viseu
- 2008–2009: Casa do Benfica Viseu
- 2009–2016: Benfica

Senior career*
Years	Team	Apps	(Gls)
2015–2019	Benfica B	53	(6)
2017–2018	→ Estoril (loan)	22	(1)
2018–2019	→ Vitória Guimarães (loan)	18	(0)
2019–2020	Vitória Guimarães	31	(3)
2020–2024	Olympiacos	9	(0)
2021–2022	→ Famalicão (loan)	50	(5)
2022–2023	→ Ankaragücü (loan)	6	(0)
2023	→ Cartagena (loan)	17	(0)
2023–2024	→ Pafos (loan)	26	(0)
2024–	Pafos	72	(5)

International career
2012	Portugal U15	2	(0)
2013	Portugal U16	11	(1)
2014	Portugal U17	15	(2)
2014	Portugal U18	2	(0)
2014–2016	Portugal U19	23	(3)
2016–2017	Portugal U20	15	(2)
2016–2018	Portugal U21	10	(0)
- * Club domestic league appearances and goals as of 19:04, 11 October 2026 (UTC)

Pedro Filipe Figueiredo Rodrigues (born 20 May 1997), also known as Pêpê, is a Portuguese professional footballer who plays as a midfielder for Cypriot First Division club Pafos.

== Club career ==
=== Benfica ===
Born in Sátão, Viseu District, Rodrigues joined S.L. Benfica's youth system at the age of 12 from local Associação Social Cultural e Recreativa e Desportista da Casa do Benfica de Viseu. On 26 August 2015, still a junior, he made his professional debut with the former's reserves, playing the entire 1–0 home win against U.D. Oliveirense in the Segunda Liga.

Rodrigues scored his first goal in the competition on 13 February 2016, in a 2–2 away draw with Académico Viseu FC. In the 2016–17 season, he netted four times (all from penalties) from 38 appearances to help the side finish in fourth position.

On 21 August 2017, Rodrigues joined G.D. Estoril Praia on a loan deal. He made his Primeira Liga debut with the club six days later, coming on as a late substitute in the 2–1 away loss to Sporting CP.

Rodrigues scored his first goal in the Portuguese top division on 30 January 2018, helping the hosts defeat C.D. Tondela 3–0 with an early long-range shot.

=== Vitória Guimarães ===
Ahead of the 2018–19 campaign, Rodrigues was loaned to Vitória de Guimarães. On 16 July 2019, he agreed to a permanent five-year contract.

Rodrigues scored five competitive goals during his spell at the Estádio D. Afonso Henriques. His first arrived on 8 August 2019 in the 3–0 away victory over FK Ventspils in the third qualifying round of the UEFA Europa League, and he repeated the feat in the second leg (6–0).

=== Olympiacos ===
On 7 September 2020, Olympiacos F.C. announced the signing of Rodrigues on a five-year deal, for a transfer fee in the range of €4 million. In the following transfer window, he was loaned to F.C. Famalicão until 30 June; the move was extended for the entire 2021–22.

Rodrigues split the 2022–23 season also on loan, starting it at MKE Ankaragücü (Turkish Süper Lig) and finishing it with FC Cartagena (Spanish Segunda División).

=== Pafos ===
On 21 August 2023, still owned by Olympiacos, Rodrigues joined Cypriot First Division club Pafos FC for one year. In July 2024, he agreed to a permanent contract. He helped them to win the first title of their ten-year history, the 2023–24 Cypriot Cup, adding the following season's national championship to reach the league phase of the UEFA Champions League.

== International career ==
All youth levels comprised, Rodrigues won 78 caps for Portugal. His first for the under-21s occurred on 11 October 2016 at the age of 19, replacing Daniel Podence at the hour mark of the 7–1 away demolition of Liechtenstein for the 2017 UEFA European Championship qualifiers.

Additionally, Rodrigues represented the nation at the 2017 FIFA U-20 World Cup in South Korea.

== Career statistics ==
As of 15 October 2026

Club	Season	League			National Cup		League Cup		Continental		Other		Total	
Club	Season	Division	Apps	Goals	Apps	Goals	Apps	Goals	Apps	Goals	Apps	Goals	Apps	Goals
Benfica B	2015–16	LigaPro	15	2	—		—		—		—		15	2
Benfica B	2016–17	LigaPro	38	4	—		—		—		—		38	4
Benfica B	Total		53	6	—		—		—		—		53	6
Estoril (loan)	2017–18	Primeira Liga	22	1	0	0	1	0	—		—		23	1
Vitória Guimarães (loan)	2018–19	Primeira Liga	18	0	2	0	0	0	—		—		20	0
Vitória Guimarães	2019–20	Primeira Liga	31	3	1	0	4	0	10 (Note: Appearances in UEFA Europa League)	2	—		46	5
Vitória Guimarães	Total		49	3	3	0	4	0	10	2	—		66	5
Olympiacos	2020–21	Super League Greece	9	0	1	0	—		3 (Note: Appearances in UEFA Champions League)	0	—		13	0
Famalicão (loan)	2020–21	Primeira Liga	18	0	0	0	—		—		—		18	0
Famalicão (loan)	2021–22	Primeira Liga	32	5	3	0	2	0	—		—		37	5
Famalicão (loan)	Total		50	5	3	0	2	0	—		—		55	5
Ankaragücü (loan)	2022–23	Süper Lig	6	0	2	0	—		—		—		8	0
Cartagena (loan)	2022–23	Segunda División	17	0	—		—		—		—		17	0
Pafos (loan)	2023–24	Cypriot First Division	26	0	5	2	—		—		—		31	2
Pafos	2024–25	Cypriot First Division	34	3	5	0	—		9 (Note: Appearances in UEFA Conference League)	0	1 (Note: Appearance in Cypriot Super Cup)	0	49	3
Pafos	2025–26	Cypriot First Division	34	2	3	1	—		14	1	1	0	52	5
Pafos	2026–27	Cypriot First Division	4	0	0	0	—		7 (Note: Four appearances in UEFA Europa League, three appearances in UEFA Conference League)	0	1	0	12	0
Pafos	Total		98	6	13	3	—		30	1	3	0	144	10
Career total			304	21	22	3	7	0	43	3	3	0	379	27

== Honours ==
Pafos

- Cypriot First Division: 2024–25
- Cypriot Cup: 2023–24, 2025–26
- Cypriot Super Cup: 2026
