= Juan Carlos Carcedo =

Spanish footballer (born 1973)

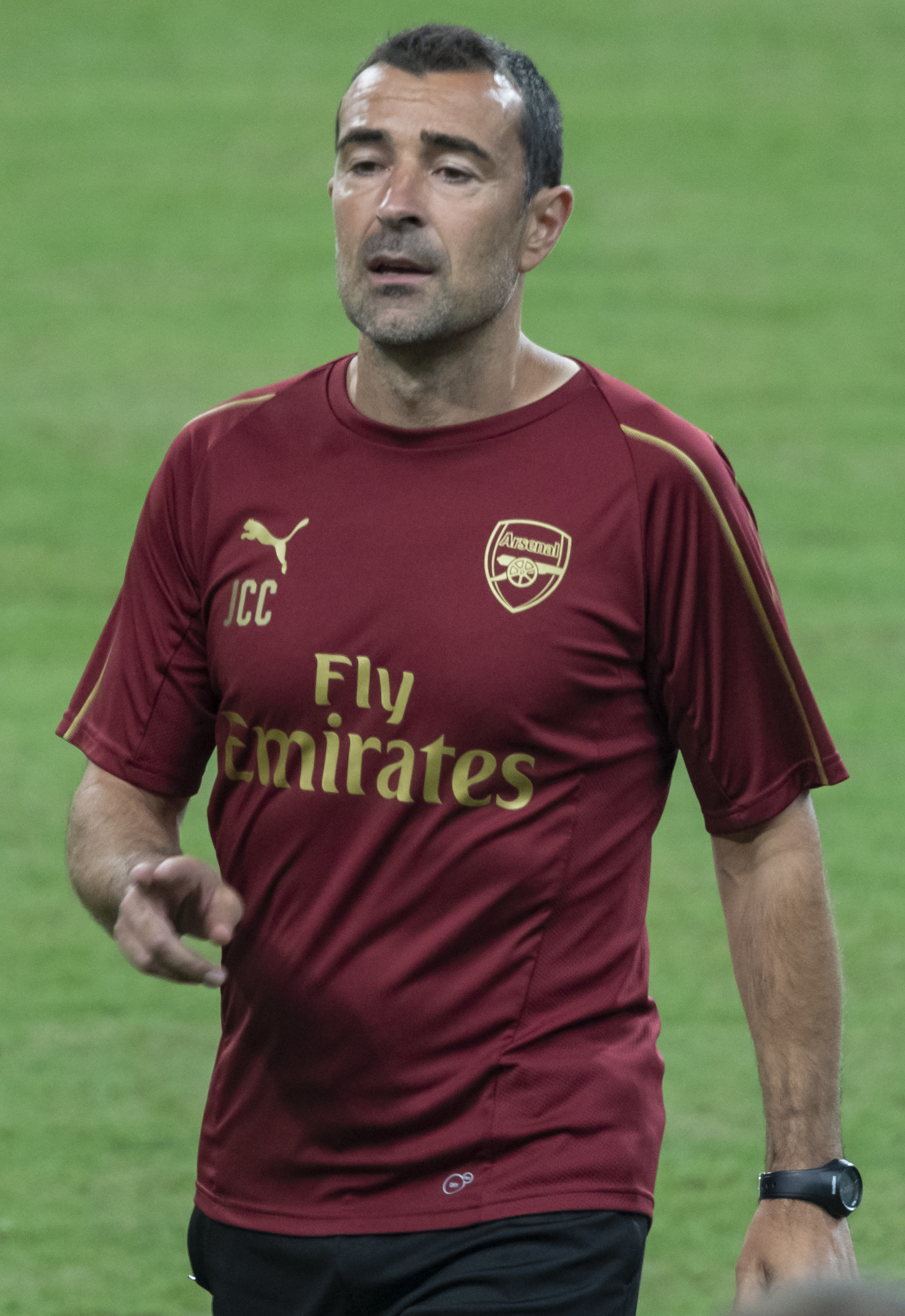
- Carcedo as assistant coach for Arsenal in 2018

Personal information
- Full name: Juan Carlos Carcedo Mardones
- Date of birth: 19 August 1973 (age 53)
- Place of birth: Logroño, Spain
- Height: 1.78 m (5 ft 10 in)
- Position: Midfielder

Team information
- Current team: Spartak Moscow (manager)

Youth career
- Hospitalet

Senior career*
Years	Team	Apps	(Gls)
1993–1994	Hospitalet	32	(0)
1994–1995	Gramenet	36	(1)
1995–1996	Espanyol B	30	(1)
1996–1999	Atlético Madrid B	78	(4)
1999–2002	Nice	21	(0)
2000–2001	→ Atlético Madrid (loan)	11	(0)
2002–2004	Leganés	45	(0)
2004–2006	Las Palmas	9	(0)
Total		241	(6)

Managerial career
- 2006–2008: Almería (assistant)
- 2008–2012: Valencia (assistant)
- 2012: Spartak Moscow (assistant)
- 2013–2016: Sevilla (assistant)
- 2015: Sevilla (interim)
- 2016–2018: Paris Saint-Germain (assistant)
- 2018–2019: Arsenal (assistant)
- 2020–2021: Ibiza
- 2022: Zaragoza
- 2023–2026: Pafos
- 2026–: Spartak Moscow
- * Club domestic league appearances and goals

Juan Carlos Carcedo Mardones (Spanish pronunciation: [xwaŋ ˈkaɾlos kaɾˈθeðo]; born 19 August 1973) is a Spanish former professional footballer who played as a midfielder. He is currently manager of Russian Premier League club Spartak Moscow.

He amassed Segunda División totals of 134 matches and four goals over seven seasons, mainly with Atlético Madrid B and Leganés. He subsequently worked as an assistant manager, always under Unai Emery. During his two and a half seasons at Pafos, already as head coach, he won the 2024–25 Cypriot First Division and the 2023–24 Cypriot Cup.

== Playing career ==
Born in Logroño, La Rioja, Carcedo began his career at CE L'Hospitalet in Segunda División B, making his debut in the competition on 5 September 1993 in a 3–3 draw at Gimnàstic de Tarragona and being sent off in the 85th minute. He played a 31 further matches during that season, earning a second dismissal on 10 October in a 1–1 home draw against UE Rubí.

In the summer of 1996, after one-year spells in the lower leagues with UDA Gramenet and RCD Espanyol B – scoring his first goal as a senior on 18 September 1994 to open a 3–1 win for the former over CD Alcoyano– Carcedo signed for Atlético Madrid, being assigned to the reserves in the Segunda División. In the 2000–01 campaign he appeared in 16 competitive games for the first team (on loan from French side OGC Nice) as they also competed at that level, the first one being a 1–0 league home loss to Recreativo de Huelva on 9 September 2000 in which he started.

Carcedo then moved to another club in the capital, CD Leganés, where he played three years in the second tier. He retired after a couple of seasons in the third with UD Las Palmas, earning promotion in the latter but only contributing four games to the feat.

== Coaching career ==
On retiring, Carcedo became assistant manager to Unai Emery at UD Almería. Despite being offered the main position at the club, he left and followed Emery to Valencia CF in 2008. In 2012, they worked together at Russia's FC Spartak Moscow.

The pair returned to Spain the following year, being appointed at Sevilla FC. On 10 May 2015, Carcedo was put in charge of the team for their match away to RC Celta de Vigo following the death of Emery's father Juan, and he managed a 1–1 draw.

In June 2016, Carcedo was one of several staff members who accompanied Emery to French title-holders Paris Saint-Germain FC. Two years later, after winning seven trophies, both left for Arsenal in the English Premier League.

Carcedo had his first coaching experience in his own right in August 2020, when he was appointed at UD Ibiza of the third division for two years. On 24 June 2021, after leading the side to their first-ever promotion to the second tier, he renewed his contract until 2023.

On 18 December 2021, after six matches without winning, Carcedo was dismissed. The following 31 May, he was appointed at the helm of Real Zaragoza also in division two, but was sacked on 6 November.

On 24 June 2023, Carcedo was announced as the new head coach of Pafos FC. On 18 May 2024, the club conquered the Cypriot Cup for the first time in its history after defeating AC Omonia 3–0 at the GSP Stadium. In January 2026, himself and his assistants Sergio Domínguez and Sebastián Corona bought out their contracts.

Carcedo was appointed at Spartak Moscow immediately after leaving Pafos, on a deal until 30 June 2028; he returned to the Russian capital after assisting Emery 13 years earlier. In his first season, he won the domestic cup.

== Managerial statistics ==
As of match played 22 November 2026

Managerial record by team and tenure
Team	Nat	From	To	Record								Ref
Team	Nat	From	To	G	W	D	L	GF	GA	GD	Win %	Ref
Ibiza	(Spain)	2 August 2020	18 December 2021	52	25	15	12	67	40	+27	48.08	
Zaragoza	(Spain)	31 May 2022	6 November 2022	15	4	4	7	9	13	−4	26.67	
Pafos	(Cyprus)	24 June 2023	5 January 2026	129	74	25	30	220	111	+109	57.36	
Spartak Moscow	(Russia)	5 January 2026	Present	38	22	9	7	69	40	+29	57.89	
Total				234	125	53	56	365	204	+161	53.42	—

== Honours ==
=== Manager ===
Pafos

- Cypriot First Division: 2024–25
- Cypriot Cup: 2023–24

Spartak Moscow

- Russian Cup: 2025–26
