= Vlad Dragomir =

Romanian footballer (born 1999)

Personal information
- Full name: Vlad Mihai Dragomir
- Date of birth: 24 April 1999 (age 27)
- Place of birth: Timișoara, Romania
- Height: 1.78 m (5 ft 10 in)
- Positions: Attacking midfielder; winger

Team information
- Current team: Pafos
- Number: 30

Youth career
- 2010–2013: LPS Banatul Timișoara
- 2013–2014: ACS Poli Timișoara
- 2015–2018: Arsenal

Senior career*
Years	Team	Apps	(Gls)
2014–2015	ACS Poli Timișoara	2	(0)
2018–2021	Perugia	69	(2)
2021	Virtus Entella	17	(1)
2021–	Pafos	162	(19)

International career^{‡}
2014–2015	Romania U15	4	(0)
2014–2015	Romania U16	3	(0)
2015	Romania U17	3	(1)
2016	Romania U18	1	(0)
2016–2018	Romania U19	10	(0)
2017–2019	Romania U21	8	(0)
2025–	Romania	13	(0)
- * Club domestic league appearances and goals as of 22 November 2026 ‡ National team caps and goals as of 17 November 2026

Vlad Mihai Dragomir (Romanian pronunciation: [ˈvlad miˈhaj dragoˈmir]; born 24 April 1999) is a Romanian professional footballer who plays as a midfielder for Cypriot First Division club Pafos and the Romania national team.

== Club career ==
Dragomir made his senior debut for ACS Poli Timișoara on 30 August 2014, aged 15, after coming on as an 83rd-minute substitute for Alexandru Lazăr in a Liga II match with CS Mioveni.

He was signed by Premier League team Arsenal for an undisclosed fee in June 2015. In September 2016, The Guardian named him on a list of the 60 best young talents born in 1999.

In August 2018, Dragomir announced that he would move to Italian Serie B side Perugia upon the expiration of his contract in England. On 26 January 2021, he returned to the second league with Virtus Entella.

In 2021, Dragomir signed for Pafos FC, where he has come to be very well-respected by the supporters. On January 28, 2026, Dragomir scored his first UEFA Champions League goal, a 30-yard screamer against Slavia Prague.

== Style of play ==
Dragomir can be deployed as an attacking midfielder or as a winger on either flank and is known for his vision and agility. During his time at Arsenal, manager Arsène Wenger compared his playing style to that of Jack Wilshere.

== Career statistics ==
=== Club ===
As of match played 22 November 2026

Appearances and goals by club, season and competition
Club	Season	League			National cup (Note: Includes Coppa Italia, Cypriot Cup)		Europe		Other		Total	
Club	Season	Division	Apps	Goals	Apps	Goals	Apps	Goals	Apps	Goals	Apps	Goals
ACS Poli Timișoara	2014–15	Liga II	2	0	0	0	—		—		2	0
Perugia	2018–19	Serie B	31	1	0	0	—		1 (Note: Appearances in Serie B promotion play-offs)	0	32	1
Perugia	2019–20	Serie B	23	0	3	0	—		1 (Note: Appearances in Serie B relegation play-offs)	0	27	0
Perugia	2020–21	Serie C	15	1	2	1	—		—		17	2
Perugia	Total		69	2	5	1	—		2	0	76	3
Virtus Entella	2020–21	Serie B	17	1	—		—		—		17	1
Pafos	2021–22	Cypriot First Division	24	1	3	0	—		—		27	1
Pafos	2022–23	Cypriot First Division	28	1	2	0	—		—		30	1
Pafos	2023–24	Cypriot First Division	33	5	4	1	—		—		37	6
Pafos	2024–25	Cypriot First Division	32	5	5	1	18 (Note: Two appearances and one goal in UEFA Europa League, sixteen appearances and two goals in UEFA Conference League)	3	1 (Note: Appearance in Cypriot Super Cup)	0	56	9
Pafos	2025–26	Cypriot First Division	35	5	5	1	14 (Note: Appearances in UEFA Champions League)	1	1	0	55	7
Pafos	2026–27	Cypriot First Division	10	2	0	0	7 (Note: Four appearances in UEFA Europa League, three appearances in UEFA Conference League)	0	1	0	18	2
Pafos	Total		162	19	19	3	39	4	3	0	223	26
Career total			250	22	24	4	39	4	5	0	318	31

=== International ===
As of match played 17 November 2026

Appearances and goals by national team and year
National team	Year	Apps	Goals
Romania	2025	5	0
Romania	2026	8	0
Total		13	0

== Honours ==
ACS Poli Timișoara

- Liga II: 2014–15

Pafos

- Cypriot First Division: 2024–25
- Cypriot Cup: 2023–24, 2025–26
- Cypriot Super Cup: 2026
