= Matheus Davó =

Brazilian footballer

Personal information
- Full name: Matheus Davó Alvarenga de Oliveira
- Date of birth: 16 August 1999 (age 27)
- Place of birth: São Paulo, Brazil
- Height: 1.78 m (5 ft 10 in)
- Position: Forward

Team information
- Current team: Maccabi Netanya

Youth career
- 2015: Joinville
- 2016–2017: Portuguesa
- 2018–2019: Guarani

Senior career*
Years	Team	Apps	(Gls)
2019	Guarani	30	(3)
2020–2022	Corinthians	6	(2)
2021	→ Guarani (loan)	22	(3)
2021	→ Philadelphia Union (loan)	1	(0)
2022	→ São Bernardo (loan)	12	(2)
2022	→ Bahia (loan)	36	(9)
2023–2024	Cruzeiro	4	(0)
2023–2024	→ Pafos (loan)	9	(2)
2024	→ América Mineiro (loan)	16	(3)
2025	Mirassol	2	(0)
2025	Remo	10	(2)
2025–	Maccabi Netanya	34	(16)
- * Club domestic league appearances and goals as of 22 August 2025

Matheus Alvarenga de Oliveira (born 16 August 1999), known as Matheus Davó, is a Brazilian professional footballer who plays as a forward for Maccabi Netanya.

== Early life ==
Born in São Paulo, he earned the nickname, Davó, which means "Grandma's" in Portuguese, due to his grandmother's intense participation in his career. She was responsible for taking him to games and training, which set him apart from other boys who played on his team at Clube do Magrão. He said, "I stayed with my grandmother during the week, my parents worked. She was the one who took me to training and to school. As they had many Matheus, that was what differentiated Matheus Davó. When I arrived at the first kindergarten, I didn't know my last name, the guys asked what it was and I said "Davó"." Then he took it, he stayed with Davó for the rest of his life.

Davó's youth career included stints at Joinville and Portuguesa. His 2017 performance with the under-17 side of Lusa resulted in scoring 12 goals in 23 games, and led to interest from Guarani as his former Portuguesa coach Márcio Zanardi had just joined the team.

== Club career ==
=== Guarani ===
Davó joined Guarani and their under-20 team in March 2018, from Portuguesa. On 17 January 2019, after impressing in the year's Copa São Paulo de Futebol Júnior by scoring six goals in eight games (including four goals in a 5–0 win against Internacional), he renewed his contract with the club for three years.

Davó made his professional debut for Bugre on 28 May 2019, coming on as a second-half substitute in a 2–1 Série B home loss against Brasil de Pelotas. He scored his first goal on 29 July 2019, netting the equalizer in a 1–1 away draw against Sport Recife, and finished the season scoring three goals in 30 matches.

=== Corinthians ===
With teams such as Santos and Cruzeiro also having interest in Davó, Corinthians acquired 60% of Davó's economic rights for R$ 2.5 million, and signed him to a four-year contract through 2023. He was presented by his new club on 12 January 2020.

Davó made his first appearance as a substitute on 16 January 2020 in a 2–1 win over New York City FC. He made his first competitive appearance ten days later, replacing Janderson in a 1–1 Campeonato Paulista tie with Mirassol.

Davó made his Série A debut on 31 October 2020, starting and netting his team's winner in a 1–0 home success over Internacional. He featured in three more league matches during the campaign, also scoring in a 2–1 loss to Atlético Mineiro, but later lost space under head coach Vagner Mancini.

==== Transfer controversy ====
During 2020, Davó's transfer to Corinthians was reviewed twice in the Brazilian courts. Prior to his transfer to Corinthians, Davó's economic rights were held by Guarani and his player agency, Elenko Sports Management after rights were formerly held by his former agency, Gold Sports. In order to get out of his contract with Guarani for its economic rights, he had to make a R$700,000 termination payment that was deposited with a 3rd party that was at odds with FIFA's position on 3rd party transactions. In a July 2020 decision, the 9th Civil Court of Campinas ruled that Davó's transfer was ruled as fraud that could have made the transfer ineffective.

In a November 2020 decision, the 5th Civil Court of Campinas overturned the previous decision and the transfer remained in effect with Davó's economic rights being held by Corinthians 60%, Guarani 20% and Davó 20%.

==== Return to Guarani (loan) ====
After declining the option of training with Corinthians' under-23 team for remainder of the 2021 season, Davó returned to Guarani on loan until the end of the year. His transfer situation addressed in the courts in 2020 caused additional delays in getting him registered to be able to play in 2021; however, the 7th Civil Court of Campinas allowed him to be registered for the 2021 season.

Davó scored once in eight matches in the 2021 Paulistão, and scored twice in 14 Série B matches before announcing his early departure in July 2021.

==== Philadelphia Union (loan) ====
On 11 August 2021, Davó joined Major League Soccer club Philadelphia Union on loan for the remainder of the 2021 season, with the Union having an option the purchase at the end of the season. He made his debut abroad on 4 September, replacing Jack McGlynn in a 1–0 home loss against New England Revolution.

His loan expired following the club's 2021 season.

==== São Bernardo (loan) ====
On 21 January 2022, Corinthians loaned Davó to São Bernardo for the 2022 Campeonato Paulista. He was a regular starter for Bernô during the competition, scoring twice in 12 appearances.

==== Bahia (loan) ====
On 7 April 2022, Davó was announced at Bahia in the second division, on loan until the end of the year. He scored nine goals during the 2022 Série B, including braces against Ponte Preta (2–1 win), Criciúma (2–1 win) and Ituano (2–0 win) as his side achieved promotion to the top tier.

=== Cruzeiro ===
On 11 January 2023, Cruzeiro announced the signing of Davó on a three-year contract; his new club paid R$3.5 million for 60% of his economic rights. He made his debut for the club seventeen days later, replacing Rafael Bilú and being sent off in a 1–1 Campeonato Mineiro home draw against Athletic Club.

== Career statistics ==
As of 22 May 2024

Club	Season	League			State League		Cup		Conmebol		Other		Total	
Club	Season	Division	Apps	Goals	Apps	Goals	Apps	Goals	Apps	Goals	Apps	Goals	Apps	Goals
Guarani	2019	Série B	30	3	0	0	0	0	—		—		30	3
Corinthians	2020	Série A	4	2	2	0	1	0	—		—		7	2
Guarani (loan)	2021	Série B	14	2	8	1	0	0	—		—		22	3
Philadelphia Union (loan)	2021	Major League Soccer	1	0	—		—		—		—		1	0
São Bernardo (loan)	2022	Série D	0	0	12	2	—		—		—		12	2
Bahia (loan)	2022	Série B	36	9	—		4	1	—		—		40	10
Cruzeiro	2023	Série A	0	0	4	0	0	0	—		—		4	0
Pafos (loan)	2023–24	Cypriot First Division	10	2	0	0	—		—		—		10	2
Career total			95	18	26	3	5	1	0	0	0	0	126	22
