= Alexandros Michail =

Cypriot footballer (born 2000)

Personal information
- Date of birth: 28 January 2000 (age 26)
- Place of birth: Limassol, Cyprus
- Position: Centre-back

Team information
- Current team: Nea Salamina
- Number: 5

Youth career
- –2013: APOEL
- 2013–2018: Karmiotissa

Senior career*
| Years | Team | Apps | (Gls) |
| 2018–2020 | Karmiotissa | | |
| 2020–2021 | Kouris Erimis | 36 | (1) |
| 2021–2024 | Pafos | 12 | (0) |
| 2024– | Nea Salamina | 27 | (2) |
- * Club domestic league appearances and goals as of 3 May 2026

Alexandros Michail (born 28 January 2000) is a Cypriot footballer who plays for Nea Salamina.

== Career ==
On 5 June 2024, Michail agreed to join Nea Salamina following three seasons with Pafos FC.
