= Renato Josipović =

Croatian footballer

Personal information
- Date of birth: 12 June 2001 (age 25)
- Place of birth: Šibenik, Croatia
- Height: 1.93 m (6 ft 4 in)
- Position: Goalkeeper

Team information
- Current team: Široki Brijeg
- Number: 40

Youth career
- 2010–2015: Šibenik
- 2015–2020: Dinamo Zagreb

Senior career*
Years	Team	Apps	(Gls)
2018–2021	Dinamo Zagreb II	25	(0)
2020–2022	Dinamo Zagreb	2	(0)
2021–2022	→ Bravo (loan)	16	(0)
2022–2023	Široki Brijeg	25	(0)
2023–2024	Pafos	0	(0)
2024	Rudeš	0	(0)
2025–	Široki Brijeg	29	(0)

International career
2015	Croatia U14	2	(0)
2016	Croatia U15	5	(0)
2016–2017	Croatia U16	4	(0)
2017	Croatia U17	3	(0)
2018	Croatia U18	2	(0)
2019–2020	Croatia U19	4	(0)
2021	Croatia U20	1	(0)
- * Club domestic league appearances and goals as of 12 February 2026

Renato Josipović (born 12 June 2001) is a Croatian professional footballer who plays as a goalkeeper for Široki Brijeg.

== Club career ==
Josipović started playing football in his hometown at Šibenik. Initially a striker, he moved to the position of goalkeeper on coach's recommendation, where he soon showed his talent. At the age of 13 he was already training with the first team. However, in the summer of 2015, after becoming an under-15 national team player, he moved to Dinamo Zagreb, at the age of 14.

At Dinamo, Josipović would make his reserve team debut in 2018, becoming a regular in the 2020–21 season in the Croatian second tier. He was capped for the first team twice, in the last matches of the 2019–20 and 2020–21 seasons, coming in for the last 14 minutes against Varaždin and Šibenik, respectively. After spending the 2021–22 season on loan at Bravo in Slovenian PrvaLiga, Josipović's contract with Dinamo was terminated and he signed a one-year contract with Široki Brijeg in Bosnia and Herzegovina.

== Career statistics ==
=== Club ===
As of 6 October 2023

Appearances and goals by club, season and competition
Club	Season	League			National cup		Continental		Other		Total	
Club	Season	Division	Apps	Goals	Apps	Goals	Apps	Goals	Apps	Goals	Apps	Goals
Dinamo Zagreb II	2018–19	Druga HNL	1	0	0	0	—		—		1	0
Dinamo Zagreb II	2019–20	Druga HNL	3	0	0	0	—		—		3	0
Dinamo Zagreb II	2020–21	Druga HNL	21	0	0	0	—		—		21	0
Dinamo Zagreb II	Total		25	0	0	0	—		—		25	0
Dinamo Zagreb	2019–20	Prva HNL	1	0	0	0	—		—		1	0
Dinamo Zagreb	2020–21	Prva HNL	1	0	0	0	0	0	—		1	0
Dinamo Zagreb	Total		2	0	0	0	0	0	—		2	0
Bravo (loan)	2021–22	Slovenian PrvaLiga	16	0	2	0	—		—		18	0
Široki Brijeg	2022–23	Premijer liga	25	0	1	0	—		—		26	0
Pafos	2023–24	Cypriot First Division	0	0	0	0	—		—		0	0
Career total			68	0	3	0	0	0	0	0	71	0
