= Muamer Tanković =

Swedish footballer

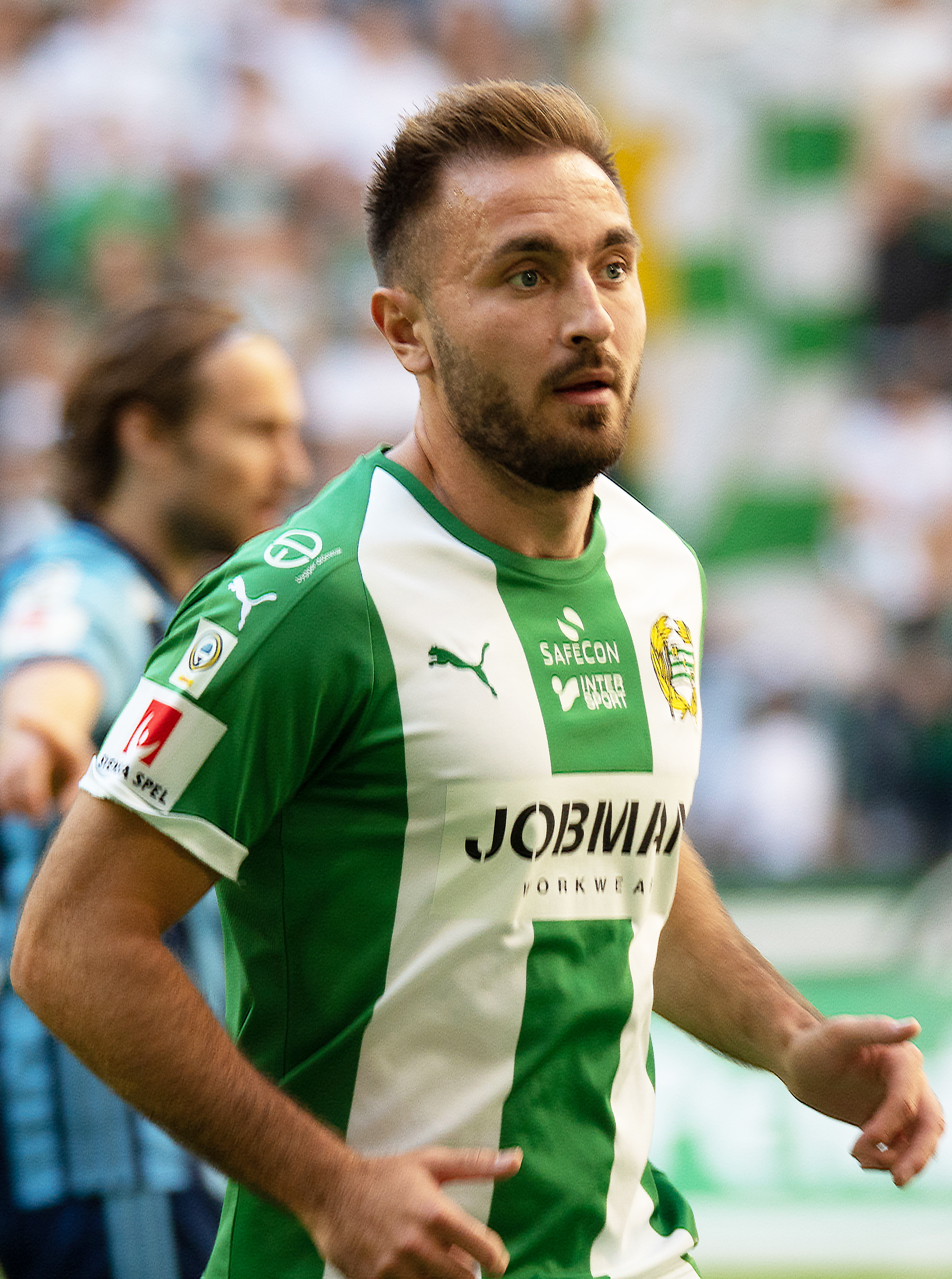
- Tanković with Hammarby IF in 2018

Personal information
- Date of birth: 22 February 1995 (age 31)
- Place of birth: Norrköping, Sweden
- Height: 1.81 m (5 ft 11 in)
- Position: Forward

Team information
- Current team: Omonia
- Number: 22

Youth career
- 2003–2004: Hageby IF
- 2005–2011: IFK Norrköping
- 2011–2013: Fulham

Senior career*
Years	Team	Apps	(Gls)
2013–2014	Fulham	3	(0)
2014–2017	AZ	58	(10)
2016–2017	→ Jong AZ	8	(8)
2017–2020	Hammarby IF	84	(29)
2020–2022	AEK Athens	45	(4)
2022–2025	Pafos	96	(28)
2025–	Omonia	35	(8)

International career^{‡}
2010–2012	Sweden U17	19	(9)
2012–2014	Sweden U19	19	(10)
2014–2017	Sweden U21/O	23	(3)
2014–2020	Sweden	5	(0)
- * Club domestic league appearances and goals as of 10 October 2026 ‡ National team caps and goals as of 15:40, 16 January 2022 (UTC)

Muamer "Mujo" Tanković (born 22 February 1995) is a Swedish professional footballer who plays as a forward for Omonia FC.

== Early life ==
Muamer Tanković was born to Bosnian Muslim parents in Norrköping and grew up in Hageby, a Million Programme area in the southern part of the city. He started to play football at a young age at the local club Hageby IF, before joining local giants IFK Norrköping in 2005, aged 10.

== Club career ==
=== Early career ===
Tanković never made his competitive senior debut for Norrköping in Allsvenskan, but appeared as an unused substitute in six league games. While at Norrköping, Tanković went on trial with German side Hamburger SV. Tanković was also linked with Chelsea, Manchester United and Juventus.

=== Fulham ===
In September 2011, he joined Fulham, aged sixteen, on a three-year contract for an undisclosed fee.

He made his Fulham debut as an 87th-minute substitute for compatriot Alexander Kačaniklić in the FA Cup third round replay against Norwich City at Craven Cottage on 14 January 2014 and his Premier League debut on 28 January against Swansea City at the Liberty Stadium, replacing Dimitar Berbatov for the last 7 minutes of a 2–0 defeat. Tanković started his first league match against Manchester United on 9 February 2014 at Old Trafford, and was substituted at half-time for Darren Bent as the game finished 2–2.

Tanković was released by Fulham in May 2014 when his contract expired.

=== AZ Alkmaar ===
==== 2014–15 ====
Muamer Tanković signed a five-year deal with the Dutch club AZ on a free transfer in June 2014 At AZ, he linked up with fellow countrymen Viktor Elm and Mattias Johansson.

Tanković scored in his competitive debut for the club on 9 August 2014, in a 3–0 away win against Heracles. He went on to score two goals and provide three assists during the opening four fixtures of the 2014-15 Eredivisie.

On 6 October 2014, in a 2–2 game against Twente, coming on as a sub, he sparked some controversy when celebrating a late equalizer by running out to the sideline and taking a seat at the bench. The gesture was meant as a gibe against manager Marco van Basten, who did not opt to start him in the fixture. In the fourth round of the KNVB Cup, in December 2014, Tanković scored a brace against NEC as AZ won 2–1 and qualified for the quarter-finals.

His form declined during the spring of 2015. He eventually finished the season with making 26 league appearances, scoring 5 goals. His last league goal of the season came against Feyenoord on 14 December 2014, in a 2–2 draw.

==== 2015–16 ====
Tanković started the season as a rotation player, but soon accelerated into goal scoring form. In late September 2015, Tankovic scored a brace in a KNVB Cup win against VVV-Venlo. He followed it up a week later by scoring one goal and providing one assist in a 3–1 league win against Heracles. He was named as the single best player in the Eredivisie "team of the week" by the football statistics website Whoscored.

Tanković appeared in 7 of AZ's games in the 2015–16 Europa League, where the club got knocked out in the group stage after finishing at the foot of the table. He made his continental senior debut in a game against the Turkish side Istanbul Basaksehir on 30 July 2015.

Once again, his form declined as the season progressed. Tanković got no to little playing time during the second half of the season, and ended up featuring in 19 league games. His scoring tally remained at 3 goals.

==== 2016–17 ====
During the season, Tanković was used sparingly by manager John van den Brom. At times he was made available to play for feeder club Jong AZ in the Dutch third tier, Tweede Divisie.

His season had a few highlights, however. On 3 December 2016, Tanković scored one goal and provided one assist as AZ drew 1–1 against Excelsior in the league.

Weeks later, Tanković scored a long range strike against the Russian outfit Zenit Saint Petersburg in a 3–2 win in the 2016–17 Europa League. His decisive goal meant that AZ finished second in their group, thus qualifying for the tournament's round of 32.

=== Hammarby IF ===
==== 2017 ====
On 10 August 2017, Tanković transferred to Hammarby, thus returning to his native country. The transfer fee was undisclosed, but reports suggested that he moved on a free. Tanković signed a three-year contract with the Stockholm-based side. He made his debut for the side only a few days later, coming on as a second half sub, in a 2–2 home draw against Östersund. Tanković scored his first competitive goal for the club on 16 August, in a 3–1 win against Akropolis in round 2 of the 2017–18 Svenska Cupen. During the fall, Tanković struggled to produce points and received heavy criticism from pundit Alexander Axén, before scoring his first league goal for Hammarby in a 1–3 loss against Halmstad on the ultimate match day of 2017.

==== 2018 ====
In 2018, Tanković played all 30 league games for Hammarby, scoring 7 goals, as the club finished 4th in the table. After the season, Tankovic was voted "Allsvenskan newcomer of the year".

==== 2019 ====
Tanković retained his fine form during the 2019 season, as Hammarby finished 3rd in the league. He scored 14 goals and provided 7 assists in 28 league games. At the end of the year, Tanković was nominated to the prize as "Midfielder of the year" and "Most valuable player in Allsvenskan", eventually missing out on both awards. Tanković reportedly attracted interest from Italian Serie A club Genoa and Super League Greece club AEK Athens ahead of the 2020 international January transfer window.

==== 2020 ====
Tanković started out the 2020 season by scoring 3 goals in the first 10 games of the Allsvenskan campaign. On 31 July, his contract with Hammarby expired and he reportedly attracted interest from clubs such as Queens Park Rangers, AEK Athens and Beşiktaş. However, on 22 August, Tanković decided to sign a new two-and-a-half-year contract with Hammarby.

=== AEK Athens ===
On 6 October 2020, Tanković signed a four-year deal with the Greek club AEK Athens. He had a release clause in his contract with Hammarby IF, which meant that he moved on a free transfer. On 29 October 2020, he scored with a close shot in a 2–1 home defeat against Leicester City for the second game of the Europa League group stage. On 5 November 2020, he scored in a 4–1 away win 2020–21 UEFA Europa League group stage game against FC Zorya Luhansk helping AEK to increase the possibility of qualifying for the next phase of the UEFA Europa League.

On 20 December 2020, he scored with a direct corner kick, in a 2–2 home draw against Volos, becoming the second player to do so, after Levi García a week earlier.

On 10 February 2021, he scored a brace in a 4–2 home win against Volos for the first leg of the Greek Cup quarter finals. On 11 April 2021, he scored with a penalty opening the score in a 3–1 away win against Aris Thessaloniki.

== International career ==
Tanković was called by Sweden after being watched by the head coach, Erik Hamrén, and made his international debut for Sweden on 5 March 2014 against Turkey coming on as a substitute for Jimmy Durmaz in the 67th minute.

After a five-year absence, Tanković was called up to the Swedish squad for the training tour in January 2019. He made his return on the pitch in a 2–2 draw against Iceland.

Tankovic made his competitive international debut in a UEFA Euro 2020 qualifying game against the Faroe Islands national football team on 18 November 2019, which Sweden won 3–0.

== Personal life ==
Tanković is of Bosnian descent, and while playing for Sweden in the Euro Under-19 Championship qualifiers against Bosnia and Herzegovina, he scored a hat-trick but did not celebrate out of respect for his parents' homeland. He cousin, Armin Tanković, is a fellow professional footballer.

He is nicknamed "Mujo".

== Style of play ==
Inspired by his idol Zlatan Ibrahimović, Tanković described himself as a "technical player" that can score and has vision. He is also known for "super skills, eye for goal and clever passing". Newspaper The Independent described Tanković's ability as "effective", due to his main forward position, his key attributes – guile, creativity and vision, as well as, his "excellent movement that it make him hard to track as he operates between the lines."

== Career statistics ==
=== Club ===
As of match played 14 April 2025

Appearances and goals by club, season and competition
Club	Season	League			National cup (Note: Includes FA Cup, KNVB Cup, Svenska Cupen, Greek Cup, Cypriot Cup)		League cup		Continental		Other		Total	
Club	Season	Division	Apps	Goals	Apps	Goals	Apps	Goals	Apps	Goals	Apps	Goals	Apps	Goals
Fulham	2013–14	Premier League	3	0	3	0	—		—		—		6	0
AZ	2014–15	Eredivisie	26	5	3	2	—		—		—		29	7
AZ	2015–16	Eredivisie	19	3	3	2	—		7 (Note: Appearance(s) in UEFA Europa League)	0	—		29	5
AZ	2016–17	Eredivisie	13	2	3	1	—		3	1	—		19	4
AZ	Total		58	10	9	5	—		10	1	—		77	16
Hammarby	2017	Allsvenskan	12	1	—		—		—		—		12	1
Hammarby	2018	Allsvenskan	30	7	3	1	—		—		—		33	8
Hammarby	2019	Allsvenskan	28	14	0	0	—		—		—		28	14
Hammarby	2020	Allsvenskan	14	7	5	4	—		1	0	—		20	11
Hammarby	Total		84	29	8	5	—		1	0	—		93	34
AEK Athens	2020–21	Superleague Greece	27	4	5	2	—		5	2	—		37	8
AEK Athens	2021–22	Superleague Greece	18	0	2	1	—		2 (Note: Appearances in UEFA Europa Conference League)	0	—		22	1
AEK Athens	Total		45	4	7	3	—		7	2	—		59	9
Pafos	2022–23	Cypriot First Division	32	8	4	0	—		—		—		36	8
Pafos	2023–24	Cypriot First Division	32	14	5	2	—		—		—		37	16
Pafos	2024–25	Cypriot First Division	28	6	2	0	—		18 (Note: Two appearances in UEFA Europa League, sixteen appearances and four goals in UEFA Conference League)	4	1 (Note: Appearance in Cypriot Super Cup)	0	49	10
Pafos	Total		92	28	11	2	—		18	4	1	0	122	34
Career total			284	71	38	15	0	0	36	7	1	0	357	93

=== International ===
Appearances and goals by national team and year
National team	Year	Apps	Goals
Sweden	2014	1	0
Sweden	2015	0	0
Sweden	2016	0	0
Sweden	2017	0	0
Sweden	2018	0	0
Sweden	2019	2	0
Sweden	2020	2	0
Total		5	0

== Honours ==
Pafos

- Cypriot First Division: 2024–25
- Cypriot Cup: 2023–24

Omonia

- Cypriot First Division: 2025–26

Individual

- Allsvenskan Newcomer of the Year: 2018
