= Battle of Écija =

Battle of Écija may refer to:

- Battle of Écija (711), see Umayyad conquest of Hispania
- Siege of Écija (913), a eunuch named Badr takes the city for Abd-ar-Rahman III
- Battle of Écija (1039)
- Battle of Écija (1275), Morocco defeated Castile
- Cry of Nueva Ecija (1896), a battle of the Philippine Revolution
