= Sebastián Corona =

Spanish footballer and assistant manager

Personal information
- Full name: Sebastián Manuel Corona Nacarino
- Date of birth: 8 July 1976 (age 50)
- Place of birth: Lora del Río, Spain
- Height: 1.82 m (6 ft 0 in)
- Position: Centre-back

Team information
- Current team: Spartak Moscow (assistant coach)

Youth career
- Sevilla

Senior career*
| Years | Team | Apps | (Gls) |
| 1995–1997 | Sevilla B | 59 | (1) |
| 1997–1999 | Sevilla | 20 | (1) |
| 1998 | → Granada (loan) | 17 | (1) |
| 2000–2002 | Albacete | 91 | (4) |
| 2002–2005 | Tenerife | 106 | (4) |
| 2005–2007 | Murcia | 26 | (0) |
| 2006–2007 | → Águilas (loan) | 33 | (2) |
| 2007–2012 | Huesca | 151 | (4) |
| 2012–2013 | Leganés | 34 | (0) |
| Total | | 537 | (17) |

Managerial career
- 2017–2022: Sevilla B (assistant)
- 2022: Zaragoza (assistant)
- 2023–2026: Pafos (assistant)
- 2026–: Spartak Moscow (assistant)
- * Club domestic league appearances and goals

Sebastián Manuel Corona Nacarino (born 8 July 1976) is a Spanish professional football coach and a former player who played as a central defender. He is an assistant coach with Russian club Spartak Moscow.

== Club career ==
Born in Lora del Río, Province of Seville, Corona played first as a professional for his hometown club Sevilla FC, but only appeared in 27 games in almost four years with the first team, and just three in La Liga. Subsequently, from January 2000 to June 2006, he would be a defensive mainstay in the Segunda División, with Albacete Balompié, CD Tenerife and Real Murcia CF.

On 7 August 2007, Corona signed with SD Huesca of Segunda División B, being an undisputed starter as the Aragonese side promoted in his first year, a first-ever for them, and remaining as such the following seasons (never less than 28 league appearances). Over the course of 13 campaigns in the second tier, he played 358 matches and scored 12 goals.

The 36-year-old Corona returned to division three in the summer of 2012, joining CD Leganés.
