= Ecija Ivušić =

Croatian television and radio presenter, and former model

- Born: 3 October 1986 (age 38); Zagreb, Croatia
- Career
- Show: Extra Dan
- Station: Extra FM

Ecija Ivušić (born 1986) is a Croatian television and radio presenter and former model.

== Early life and education ==
Ivušić was born in Zagreb. She studied journalism and graduated at the faculty of political science, University of Zagreb.

== Career ==
Ivušić's television career began when she co-hosted Hrvatska Traži Zvijezdu (Croatian Idol) in 2011. She went on to become a TV presenter for the Croatian Music Channel, during which she also worked as a TV presenter for Eurojackpot and the Croatian National Television's (HRT) show "4 Zida". She is currently a radio host for Extra FM, where she has her own radio show "Extra Dan."
