= Pafos FC =

Cypriot football club

Pafos
- Full name: Pafos Football Club
- Founded: 10 June 2014; 12 years ago
- Ground: Stelios Kyriakides Stadium
- Capacity: 9,300
- Chairman: Roman Dubov
- Head coach: Ricardo Sá Pinto
- League: First Division
- 2025–26: First Division, 4th of 14
- Website: pafosfc.com.cy
Home colours	Away colours	Third colours

Pafos Football Club (Greek: Πάφος F.C.) is a professional football club based in Paphos, Cyprus. Founded on 10 June 2014 following the merger of AEP Paphos and AEK Kouklia, the club represents the wider Paphos region in the Cypriot First Division. Pafos play home matches at the Stelios Kyriakides Stadium, which has a capacity of 9,394, though their European home matches are played at the Alphamega Stadium (capacity 10,830) due to the former falling short of UEFA standards.

The club won their first major honour, the Cypriot Cup, in 2024 and secured a first league championship in 2024–25. Pafos made their European debut in the UEFA Europa Conference League in 2024–25, reaching the round of 16, and entered the UEFA Champions League qualifiers for the first time in 2025–26 as domestic champions. After surviving two 2025–26 UEFA Champions League qualifying rounds, Pafos also won their subsequent play-off against Red Star Belgrade and advanced to the league phase.

== History ==
=== Early years (2014–2017) ===
Pafos FC was formed to consolidate senior football in the Paphos district. AEP Paphos and AEK Kouklia voted to combine operations in June 2014; the new club played its first season in the Cypriot Second Division. Pafos won promotion in 2014–15 as Second Division runners-up, were relegated in 2015–16, and returned to the top flight at the first attempt in 2016–17.

=== Investment and consolidation (2017–2023) ===
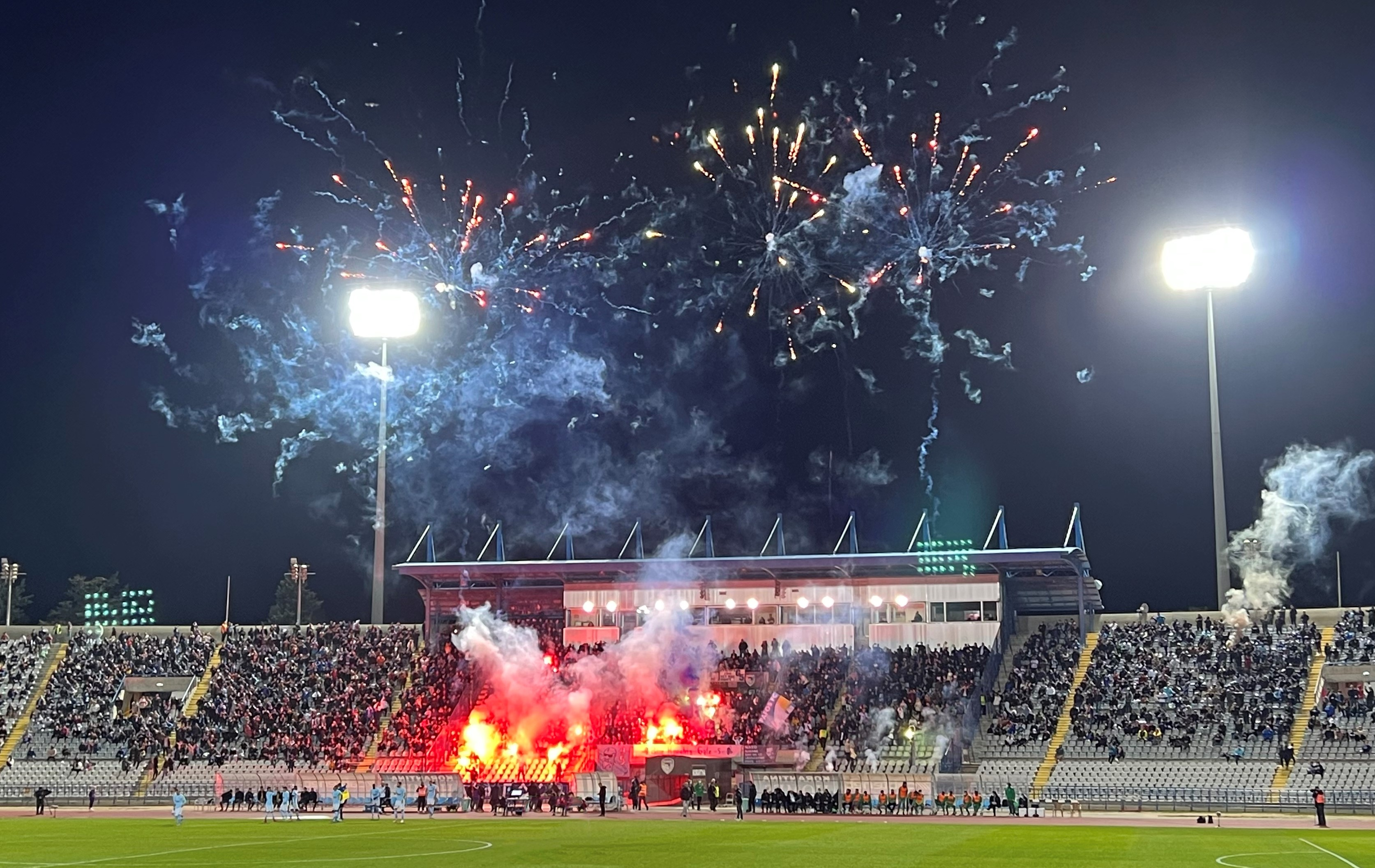
Pafos FC - Aris Limassol FC 25.02.2022

In 2017 the club came under the control of Total Sports Investments, linked with British-based businessman Roman Dubov, and began a programme of professionalisation across the first team and academy. The training centre in Paphos underwent significant renovation in 2020. Spanish coach Juan Carlos Carcedo was appointed head coach in June 2023.

=== First honours and European debut (2023–present) ===
Pafos won the 2023–24 Cypriot Cup—the club's first major trophy—by defeating Omonia 3–0 in the final on 18 May 2024 at the GSP Stadium in Nicosia. The victory qualified the club for European competition for the first time.

In 2024–25 Pafos entered the UEFA Europa Conference League in the second qualifying round, overturning a first-leg defeat to Žalgiris with a 3–0 home win to advance 4–2 on aggregate. They eliminated CSKA 1948 (after extra time) and CFR Cluj (on penalties) to reach the league phase, where they recorded home wins over Astana and other positive results against seeded opposition.

In February 2025, Pafos faced Omonia in what was billed as the first all-Cypriot tie in UEFA competition; after a 1–1 first leg in Nicosia, Pafos won the return in Limassol to advance 3–2 on aggregate to the round of 16, where they were eliminated by Djurgårdens IF.

Pafos secured the 2024–25 league title—their first—by beating Aris Limassol 4–0 on 5 May 2025 and were officially crowned champions later that month.

As Cypriot champions, Pafos entered the 2025–26 UEFA Champions League in the second qualifying round and defeated Maccabi Tel Aviv 2–1 on aggregate (1–1 home, 1–0 away at a neutral venue in Serbia). In the third qualifying round they beat Dynamo Kyiv 3–0 on aggregate (1–0 away in Lublin, 2–0 home at Alphamega Stadium) to reach the play-off round for the first time. In the play-offs, Pafos eliminated Serbian side Red Star Belgrade with a 3–2 aggregate victory, securing their first-ever place in the UEFA Champions League league stage.

On 5 January 2026, Pafos announced that head coach Juan Carlos Carcedo had bought out his contract, and the contracts of Sergio Domínguez Cobo and Sebastián Corona, and had left the club for a new project. Four days later, on 9 January 2026, Pafos announced the appointment of Albert Celades as their new head coach on a contract until 2027. On 28 April, Pafos announced that they had terminated their contract with Albert Celades, and that Ricardo Sá Pinto had been appointed as the clubs new head coach.

=== Domestic ===
Season	League									Cypriot Cup	Top goalscorer		Manager
Season	Div.	Pos.	Pl.	W	D	L	GS	GA	P	Cypriot Cup	Name	League	Manager
2014–15	2nd	2nd	26	19	5	2	55	19	62	First Round			(Serbia) Radmilo Ivančević (Cyprus) Sofoklis Sofokleous
2015–16	1st	12th	36	8	12	16	41	58	36	Quarterfinal	(Netherlands) Nassir Maachi	11	(Cyprus) Sofoklis Sofokleous (Spain) José Manuel Roca (Cyprus) Apostolos Makrides
2016–17	2nd	2nd	26	17	6	3	51	24	57	First Round			(Cyprus) Dimitris Ioannou
2017–18	1st	10th	36	11	9	16	36	51	42	Semifinal	(Austria) Daniel Sikorski (France) Kévin Bérigaud	7	(Slovenia) Luka Elsner (Scotland) Steven Pressley
2018–19	1st	8th	32	12	8	12	39	50	38	Quarterfinal	(Slovakia) Adam Nemec	16	(Scotland) Steven Pressley (Croatia) Željko Kopić
2019–20	1st	7th	23	8	6	9	26	28	30	Second Round	(Finland) Onni Valakari	5	(Croatia) Željko Kopić (Wales) Cameron Toshack
2020–21	1st	7th	40	18	9	13	58	38	63	Second Round	(Finland) Onni Valakari (France) Kévin Bérigaud	13	(Wales) Cameron Toshack (Ukraine) Dmytro Mykhaylenko (England) Stephen Constantine
2021–22	1st	6th	32	11	13	8	39	30	46	Second Round	(Finland) Onni Valakari	10	(Slovenia) Darko Milanič (Spain) Míchel Salgado (Acting Head Coach)
2022–23	1st	4th	32	17	12	7	60	30	63	Semifinal	(Brazil) Jairo	18	(Norway) Henning Berg (Spain) Míchel Salgado (Acting Head Coach)
2023–24	1st	5th	36	18	8	10	60	33	62	Champions	(Brazil) Jairo	16	(Spain) Juan Carlos Carcedo
2024–25	1st	1st	36	26	4	6	67	21	82	Runners Up	(Brazil) Jairo	13	(Spain) Juan Carlos Carcedo (Algeria) Sofyane Cherfa (Caretaker) (Spain) Albert Celades (Portugal) Ricardo Sá Pinto

== Honours ==
Type	Competition	Titles	Seasons
Domestic	Cypriot First Division	1	2024–25
Domestic	Cypriot Cup	2	2023–24, 2025–26
Domestic	Cypriot Super Cup	1	2026

== UEFA club coefficient ranking ==
UEFA Team Ranking (2026/27)

=== UEFA Club ranking ===
Rank	Country	Team	Points
79	(Belgium)	Genk	25.000
80	(Austria)	Sturm Graz	25.000
81	(Cyprus)	Pafos	24.125
82	(England)	Nottingham Forest	23.000
83	(Slovenia)	Celje	23.000

Last update: 29 August 2026
Source: UEFA

== Club's identity ==
The logo of Pafos FC is a variation of AEP Paphos's logo and a refresh of Pafos FC's first logo, including the name of the team and town and the classic figure of the Cypriot hero Evagoras Pallikarides. The logo also includes the team's colours, blue, white, and gold. The emblem was renewed during the period 2018–19, making the depiction of the hero Evagoras Pallikarides more prominent.

=== Kit manufacturers and shirt sponsors ===
From 2019 to 2023, Pafos FC's kits were manufactured by Jako. Starting with the 2023–24 season, Pafos FC transitioned to Puma, both for the Main Team and for Academy, as their official kit supplier, though the club retained its core sponsors — Korantina Homes, LF Group, and Cablenet.

== Players ==
As of 9 September 2026

Note: Flags indicate national team as defined under FIFA eligibility rules; some limited exceptions apply. Players may hold more than one non-FIFA nationality.

No.	Pos.	Nation	Player
1	GK	NED	Jay Gorter
2	DF	FRA	Yoram Zague (on loan from Paris Saint-Germain)
3	DF	MAR	Samy Mmaee (on loan from Dinamo Zagreb)
4	DF	BRA	David Luiz
5	DF	ESP	David Goldar
6	MF	POR	Guga
7	MF	BRA	Bruno Felipe
8	MF	POR	Domingos Quina
11	FW	BRA	Jajá
12	MF	SWE	Ken Sema
13	FW	CMR	Moumi Ngamaleu
14	DF	CYP	Nikolas Ioannou
17	FW	POR	Afonso Patrão
18	FW	BRA	Lelê (on loan from Fluminense)

No.	Pos.	Nation	Player
20	MF	BRA	Biel Teixeira (on loan from Sporting CP)
23	DF	POR	Jónatas Noro
26	MF	BIH	Ivan Šunjić
30	MF	ROU	Vlad Dragomir (captain)
33	FW	BRA	Anderson Silva
47	FW	AZE	Murad Mammadov
50	MF	POR	Alexandre Brito
60	MF	CYP	Christos Evzona
71	GK	CYP	Michalis Papastylianou
77	DF	CPV	João Correia
88	MF	POR	Pêpê
98	GK	CYP	Charalampos Kyriakidis
99	GK	POL	Radosław Majecki (on loan from Monaco)

=== Out on loan ===
Note: Flags indicate national team as defined under FIFA eligibility rules; some limited exceptions apply. Players may hold more than one non-FIFA nationality.

No.	Pos.	Nation	Player
10	FW	BEL	Landry Dimata (at Chongqing Tonglianglong until 31 December 2026)
—	DF	CYP	Giorgos Skafi (at Akritas Chlorakas until 31 May 2027)
—	DF	CYP	Panayiotis Charalambous (at Digenis Akritas Morphou until 31 May 2027)

== Current staff ==
Senior management
Vice president	(Cyprus) George Ioannou
CEO	(Cyprus) Charis Theocharous
COO	(England) Rustam Khafizov
Sporting director	(Italy) Cristiano Giaretta
Head scout	(Portugal) Rodolfo Filipe Aniceto Vaz
Senior scout	(Brazil) Pedro Henrique
CFA representative	(Cyprus) Filippos Georgiou
Technical staff
Head coach	(Portugal) Ricardo Sá Pinto
Assistant coach	(Portugal) Nuno Morais
Fitness coach	(Portugal) Leandro De Sousa Mendes
Goalkeeping coach	(Portugal) Ricardo Janota
Strength coach	(Brazil) Daniel Caraça
Doctor	(Russia) Ivan Akimov
Physio	(Cyprus) Charalampos Karagiannis
Physio	(Brazil) Nicolas Gonçalves
Sports scientist	(Spain) Luis Vita
Video analyst	(Brazil) Kaio Fonseca
Team manager	(Cyprus) Xenofon Onisiforou
Nutritionist	(Belgium) Max Bogaert
Kit manager	(Romania) Laurentiu Lungu
Kit manager	(Cyprus) Marius Mihalcea
Other staff
Director of finance	(Russia) Egor Tkachenko
Commercial director	(Russia) Andrey Finerman
Head of media and communications	(Cyprus) Christoforos Matheou
Head of football operations	(Cyprus) Michalis Kiriakou
Media officer	(Cyprus) Raphael Michael
Social media	(Cyprus) Alia Spyropoulou
Photographer	(Ukraine) Andrii Lichko

== Records ==
=== Most appearances ===
As of match played 8 November 2026

	Name	Years	League apps	League goals	Cup apps	Cup goals	Super Cup apps	Super Cup goals	Europe apps	Europe goals	Total apps	Total goals
1	(Romania) Vlad Dragomir	2021–Present	161	19	19	3	3	0	40	4	223	26
2	(Brazil) Bruno Felipe	2023–Present	112	10	13	0	3	0	39	2	167	12
3	(Brazil) Jairo	2021-2025	127	55	16	4	1	0	18	1	162	60
4	(Finland) Onni Valakari	2020–2025	136	40	15	6	0	0	7	0	158	46
5	(Portugal) Pêpê	2023–2024, 2024–Present	101	5	14	4	3	0	35	1	153	10
6	(Czech Republic) Josef Kvída	2020–2025	124	4	11	0	0	0	1	0	136	4
7	(Sweden) Muamer Tanković	2022–2025	96	28	14	2	1	0	23	4	134	34
8	(Brazil) Anderson Silva	2024–2025, 2025–Present	76	23	8	7	3	0	35	6	123	35
9	(Spain) David Goldar	2023–Present	73	9	9	1	3	0	35	3	120	13
10	(Brazil) Jajá	2024–2025, 2025–Present	71	9	12	5	2	0	31	6	116	20
10	(Bosnia and Herzegovina) Ivan Šunjić	2024–Present	69	7	9	0	2	0	36	0	116	7

=== Top goalscorers ===
As of match played 8 November 2026

	Name	Years	League apps	League goals	Cup apps	Cup goals	Super Cup apps	Super Cup goals	Europe apps	Europe goals	Total apps	Total goals	Ratio
1	(Brazil) Jairo	2021-2025	127	55	16	4	1	0	18	1	162	60	0.37
2	(Finland) Onni Valakari	2020–2025	136	40	15	6	0	0	7	0	158	46	0.29
3	(Brazil) Anderson Silva	2024–2025, 2025–Present	76	23	8	7	3	0	35	6	123	35	0.28
4	(Sweden) Muamer Tanković	2022–2025	96	28	14	2	1	0	23	4	134	34	0.25
5	(France) Kévin Bérigaud	2018-2022	68	22	3+	2	0	0	0	0	71+	24	0.34
6	(Romania) Vlad Dragomir	2021–Present	161	19	19	3	3	0	40	4	223	26	0.12
7	(Cape Verde) João Correia	2024–Present	58	17	6	0	2	0	30	6	96	23	0.24
8	(Slovakia) Adam Nemec	2018–2020	42	17	6	5	0	0	0	0	48	22	0.46
9	(Brazil) Jajá	2024–2025, 2025–Present	71	9	12	5	2	0	31	6	116	20	0.17
10	(Netherlands) Nassir Maachi	2015–2016	31	11	1	2	0	0	0	0	32	13	0.41
10	(Spain) David Goldar	2023–Present	73	9	9	1	3	0	35	3	120	13	0.11
10	(Brazil) Lelê	2026–Present	20	8	3	1	1	1	9	3	33	13	0.39

=== Managers ===
As of match played 8 November 2026

Manager name	From	To	Duration	P	W	D	L	Win %
(Serbia) Radmilo Ivančević	1 July 2014	14 October 2014	105 days					
(Cyprus) Sofoklis Sofokleous	1 November 2014	9 November 2015	1 year, 8 days					
(Spain) José Manuel Roca	17 November 2015	14 December 2015	27 days					
(Cyprus) Apostolos Makridis	16 December 2015	31 May 2016	167 days					
(Cyprus) Dimitris Ioannou	14 June 2016	31 May 2017	351 days					
(Slovenia) Luka Elsner	30 June 2017	21 January 2018	205 days	23	6	6	11	26.09
(Scotland) Steven Pressley	31 January 2018	9 October 2018	251 days	22	8	5	9	36.36
(Croatia) Željko Kopić	19 October 2018	6 November 2019	1 year, 18 days	41	16	11	14	39.02
(England) Jeremy Steele (Caretaker)	6 November 2019	13 December 2019	37 days	5	3	1	1	60
(Wales) Cameron Toshack	13 December 2019	20 October 2020	312 days	21	8	5	8	38.1
(Ukraine) Dmytro Mykhaylenko	20 October 2020	31 January 2021	103 days	16	4	5	7	25
(England) Stephen Constantine	4 February 2021	30 June 2021	146 days	18	12	2	4	66.67
(Slovenia) Darko Milanič	30 June 2021	10 May 2022	314 days	33	11	14	8	33.33
(Spain) Míchel Salgado (Caretaker)	14 May 2022	22 May 2022	8 days	2	1	0	1	50
(Norway) Henning Berg	11 June 2022	3 April 2023	296 days	33	17	11	5	51.52
(Spain) Míchel Salgado (Caretaker)	3 April 2023	24 June 2023	82 days	9	3	3	3	33.33
(Spain) Juan Carlos Carcedo	24 June 2023	5 January 2026	2 years, 195 days	129	74	25	30	57.36
(Algeria) Sofyane Cherfa (Caretaker)	5 January 2026	9 January 2026	4 days	1	1	0	0	100
(Spain) Albert Celades	9 January 2026	28 April 2026	109 days	21	9	6	6	42.86
(Portugal) Ricardo Sá Pinto	28 April 2026		195 days	25	10	8	7	40
