= 2023–24 Cypriot Cup =

82nd edition of the Cypriot Cup

2023–24 Cyprus Coca-Cola Cup

Tournament details
- Country: Cyprus
- Dates: 25 October 2023 – 18 May 2024
- Teams: 26

Final positions
- Champions: Pafos
- Runners-up: Omonia

The 2023–24 Cypriot Cup was the 82nd edition of the Cypriot Cup. It was contested by 26 teams from the Cypriot First and Second Divisions. It began on 25 October 2023 and concluded on 18 May 2024 with the final taking place at the GSP Stadium in Nicosia. The winners qualified for the 2024–25 UEFA Europa League first qualifying round.

Pafos won the cup on 18 May 2024 (their first Cypriot Cup win), defeating Omonia 3–0 in the final.

== Format ==
The tournament begins with 20 teams entering the first round; six teams receive a bye to the second round. In the first round, the ties are one-legged, and First Division clubs are drawn against Second Division clubs.

The second round is contested by 16 teams: the ones which qualified from the first round, and those which were exempt from the first round. The ties in the second round are one-legged, and from this point onwards, there are no restrictions on the draws. The ties in the quarter-finals are also one-legged. The semi-finals are the only round of the tournament, where the ties will be two-legged.

The final is contested in a single game, and will take place at the GSP Stadium. The winners qualify for the first qualifying round of the 2024–25 Europa League.

If, in any round, a winner is not determined after 90 minutes, the two teams play extra time. If a winner is still not determined after extra time, a penalty shootout takes place. There is no away goals rule.

== First round ==
The draw for the first round took place on 28 September 2023. The previous season's cup finalists (AEL Limassol and Omonia), 2023–24 UEFA Europa League qualifiers Aris Limassol, one other club from the 2023–24 Cypriot First Division (Pafos), and two clubs from the 2023–24 Cypriot Second Division (PAEEK and Ypsonas) received byes.

Team 1	Score	Team 2
25 October 2023
APOEL (1)	2–0	Peyia 2014 (2)
Olympiakos Nicosia (2)	4–1	Karmiotissa Pano Polemidia (1)
1 November 2023
AEK Larnaca (1)	3–2	Achyronas-Onisilos (2)
8 November 2023
Akritas Chlorakas (2)	3–4	AEZ Zakakiou (1)
Doxa Katokopias (1)	0–1	Omonia 29M (2)
Nea Salamis (1)	6–0	Enosis Neon Paralimni (2)
6 December 2023
Omonia Aradippou (2)	0–2	Ethnikos Achna (1)
13 December 2023
Anorthosis Famagusta (1)	3–1	ENAD Polis Chrysochous (2)
Ayia Napa (2)	0–6	Apollon Limassol (1)
Othellos Athienou (1)	4–1	Digenis Akritas Morphou (2)

== Second round ==
The ten first round winners and six teams given first round byes entered the second round.

Team 1	Score	Team 2
16 January 2024
Nea Salamis (1)	w/o (Note: APOEL were disqualified for fan violence during the match.)	APOEL (1)
Omonia 29M (2)	0–2	Anorthosis Famagusta (1)
17 January 2024
AEK Larnaca (1)	4–2	Othellos Athienou (1)
18 January 2024
AEZ Zakakiou (1)	4–2	PAEEK (2)
Olympiakos Nicosia (2)	0–1	Pafos (1)
Omonia (1)	3–0	Ypsonas (2)
25 January 2024
Ethnikos Achna (1)	1–2	Aris Limassol (1)
21 February 2024
Apollon Limassol (1)	3–1	AEL Limassol (1)

== Quarter-finals ==
The eight second round winners entered the quarter-finals.

Team 1	Score	Team 2
28 February 2024
Nea Salamis (1)	0–5	Pafos (1)
Omonia (1)	3–1	AEZ Zakakiou (1)
29 February 2024
Anorthosis Famagusta (1)	2–3	Aris Limassol (1)
Apollon Limassol (1)	2–1	AEK Larnaca (1)

== Semi-finals ==
The four quarter-final winners entered the semi-finals, held over two legs. The first legs were held on 10 April 2024, followed by the second legs on 17 April 2024.

Team 1	Agg.	Team 2	1st leg	2nd leg
Pafos (1)	3–2	Apollon Limassol (1)	2–1	1–1
Aris Limassol (1)	0–3	Omonia (1)	0–3	0–0

== Final ==
The final was held between the two semi-final winners.

18 May 2024
17:00 EEST

Omonia	0–3	Pafos
		Tanković 8' (pen.); Dragomir 36'; Pêpê 40'

GSP Stadium, Nicosia
Referee: Srđan Jovanović (Serbia)
