= Pafos FC in European football =

Overview of Pafos FC's role in European football

Pafos in European football
- Club: Pafos
- Most appearances: Vlad Dragomir (40)
- Top scorer: Jajá (6); João Correia (6); Anderson Silva (6)
- First entry: 2024–25 UEFA Europa League
- Latest entry: 2026–27 UEFA Europa League

Pafos is a Cypriot football club based in Paphos, Cyprus.

== History ==
=== 2020s ===
Pafos first qualified for European competition in 2024 after winning the 2023–24 Cypriot Cup against AC Omonia, qualifying for the First qualifying round of the 2024–25 UEFA Europa League where they were defeated by IF Elfsborg and dropped into the 2024–25 UEFA Conference League. Pafos went on to reach the league stage, where they finished 12th and advanced to the Knockout phase play-offs where they would beat AC Omonia before being eliminated by Djurgården at the Round of 16 stage.

In 2025, Pafos won the Cypriot First Division for the first time, and as a result qualified for the UEFA Champions League for the first time, entering at the Second qualifying round stage. Here they defeated Maccabi Tel Aviv before going on to face Dynamo Kyiv.

== Matches ==
As of match played 5 November 2026

Season	Competition	Round	Opponent	Home	Away	Aggregate
2024–25	UEFA Europa League	1Q	(Sweden) IF Elfsborg	2–5	0–3	2–8
2024–25	UEFA Conference League	2Q	(Lithuania) Žalgiris	3–0 (a.e.t.)	1–2	4–2
2024–25	UEFA Conference League	3Q	(Bulgaria) CSKA 1948	4–0 (a.e.t.)	1–2	5–2
2024–25	UEFA Conference League	PO	(Romania) CFR Cluj	3–0	0–1	3–1
2024–25	UEFA Conference League	LP	(Moldova) Petrocub Hîncești	—N/a	4–1	12th place
2024–25	UEFA Conference League	LP	(Germany) 1. FC Heidenheim	0–1	—N/a	12th place
2024–25	UEFA Conference League	LP	(Kazakhstan) Astana	1–0	—N/a	12th place
2024–25	UEFA Conference League	LP	(Italy) Fiorentina	—N/a	2–3	12th place
2024–25	UEFA Conference League	LP	(Slovenia) Celje	2–0	—N/a	12th place
2024–25	UEFA Conference League	LP	(Switzerland) Lugano	—N/a	2–2	12th place
2024–25	UEFA Conference League	KPO	(Cyprus) Omonia	2–1	1–1	3–2
2024–25	UEFA Conference League	R16	(Sweden) Djurgårdens IF	1–0	0–3	1–3
2025–26	UEFA Champions League	2Q	(Israel) Maccabi Tel Aviv	1–1	1–0	2–1
2025–26	UEFA Champions League	3Q	(Ukraine) Dynamo Kyiv	2–0	1–0	3–0
2025–26	UEFA Champions League	PO	(Serbia) Red Star Belgrade	1–1	2–1	3–2
2025–26	UEFA Champions League	LP	(Greece) Olympiacos	—N/a	0–0	26th place
2025–26	UEFA Champions League	LP	(Germany) Bayern Munich	1–5	—N/a	26th place
2025–26	UEFA Champions League	LP	(Kazakhstan) Kairat	—N/a	0–0	26th place
2025–26	UEFA Champions League	LP	(Spain) Villarreal	1–0	—N/a	26th place
2025–26	UEFA Champions League	LP	(France) Monaco	2–2	—N/a	26th place
2025–26	UEFA Champions League	LP	(Italy) Juventus	—N/a	0–2	26th place
2025–26	UEFA Champions League	LP	(England) Chelsea	—N/a	0–1	26th place
2025–26	UEFA Champions League	LP	(Czech Republic) Slavia Prague	4–1	—N/a	26th place
2026–27	UEFA Europa League	2Q	(Croatia) Hajduk Split	4–0 (a.e.t.)	0–2	4–2
2026–27	UEFA Europa League	3Q	(Austria) Red Bull Salzburg	3–3	0–1	3–4
2026–27	UEFA Conference League	PO	(Albania) Dinamo City	4–2 (a.e.t.)	1–1	5–3
2026–27	UEFA Conference League	LP	(Italy) Atalanta	—N/a	1–3	
2026–27	UEFA Conference League	LP	(Latvia) Riga	1–1	—N/a	
2026–27	UEFA Conference League	LP	(Netherlands) Twente	—N/a	1–3	
2026–27	UEFA Conference League	LP	(Denmark) Midtjylland		—N/a	
2026–27	UEFA Conference League	LP	(Sweden) Mjällby	—N/a		
2026–27	UEFA Conference League	LP	(Scotland) Heart of Midlothian		—N/a	

Notes

- 1Q: First qualifying round
- 2Q: Second qualifying round
- 3Q: Third qualifying round
- PO: Play-off round
- LP: League Phase
- KPO: Knockout phase play-offs
- R16: Round of 16

== Player statistics ==
=== Appearances ===
As of match played 5 November 2026

Rank	Player	Years	UEFA Champions League	UEFA Europa League	UEFA Europa Conference League	Total	Ratio
1	(Romania) Vlad Dragomir	2021–	14 (1)	6 (1)	20 (2)	40 (4)	0.1
2	(Brazil) Bruno Felipe	2023–	13 (1)	5 (0)	21 (1)	39 (2)	0.05
3	(Bosnia and Herzegovina) Ivan Šunjić	2024–	13 (0)	4 (0)	19 (0)	36 (0)	0
4	(Spain) David Goldar	2023–	12 (0)	6 (1)	17 (2)	35 (3)	0.09
4	(Portugal) Pêpê	2023–2024; 2024–	14 (1)	4 (0)	17 (0)	35 (1)	0.03
4	(Brazil) Anderson Silva	2024–2025; 2025–	13 (2)	1 (0)	21 (4)	35 (6)	0.17
7	(Brazil) Jajá	2024–2025; 2025–	13 (2)	4 (0)	14 (4)	31 (6)	0.19
8	(Cape Verde) João Correia	2024–	9 (2)	3 (1)	18 (3)	30 (6)	0.2
9	(Ghana) Derrick Luckassen	2024–2026	14 (1)	0 (0)	15 (1)	29 (2)	0.07
10	(Cyprus) Kostas Pileas	2024–2026	13 (0)	2 (0)	11 (0)	26 (0)	0
10	(Portugal) Domingos Quina	2024–	11 (0)	3 (0)	12 (0)	26 (0)	0
12	(Sweden) Muamer Tanković	2022–2025	5 (0)	2 (0)	16 (4)	23 (4)	0.17
13	(Sweden) Ken Sema	2025–	11 (0)	2 (0)	8 (1)	21 (1)	0.05
14	(Brazil) Jairo	2021–2025	(-)	2 (0)	16 (1)	18 (1)	0.06
14	(Croatia) Mislav Oršić	2025–2026	14 (3)	0 (0)	4 (1)	18 (4)	0.22
16	(Croatia) Ivica Ivušić	2023–2025	(-)	2 (0)	15 (0)	17 (0)	0
17	(Brazil) David Luiz	2025–	7 (1)	4 (0)	5 (0)	16 (1)	0.06
18	(Cyprus) Neofytos Michail	2024–2026	12 (0)	0 (0)	1 (0)	13 (0)	0
19	(Senegal) Moustapha Name	2022–2025	0 (0)	2 (0)	10 (1)	12 (1)	0.08
20	(Mozambique) Bruno Langa	2025–2026	11 (0)	(-)	(-)	11 (0)	0
21	(Republic of the Congo) Mons Bassouamina	2025–2026	9 (1)	(-)	(-)	9 (1)	0.11
21	(Poland) Radosław Majecki	2026–	(-)	4 (0)	5 (0)	9 (0)	0
21	(Cyprus) Nikolas Ioannou	2026–	(-)	4 (0)	5 (1)	9 (1)	0.11
21	(Brazil) Lelê	2026–	(-)	4 (1)	5 (2)	9 (3)	0.33
21	(Portugal) Guga	2026–	(-)	4 (1)	5 (0)	9 (1)	0.11
26	(Argentina) Jonathan Silva	2024–2025	(-)	0 (0)	7 (1)	7 (1)	0.14
26	(Finland) Onni Valakari	2020–2025	(-)	2 (0)	5 (0)	7 (0)	0
26	(Cyprus) Marios Ilia	2024–2025	1 (0)	2 (0)	4 (0)	7 (0)	0
26	(Brazil) Biel Teixeira	2026–	(-)	4 (2)	3 (2)	7 (4)	0.57
26	(Portugal) Alexandre Brito	2026–	(-)	3 (0)	4 (0)	7 (0)	0
31	(Portugal) Pedro Pelágio	2023–2025	(-)	2 (0)	4 (0)	6 (0)	0
31	(Belgium) Landry Dimata	2025–	6 (0)	(-)	(-)	6 (0)	0
31	(Morocco) Samy Mmaee	2026–	(-)	1 (0)	5 (0)	6 (0)	0
34	(Brazil) Léo Natel	2024–2025	(-)	0 (0)	5 (0)	5 (0)	0
35	(Argentina) Matías Melluso	2023–2024	(-)	1 (0)	3 (0)	4 (0)	0
35	(Croatia) Zvonimir Šarlija	2025	(-)	0 (0)	4 (0)	4 (0)	0
37	(Brazil) Rafael Pontelo	2024–2025	(-)	0 (0)	3 (0)	3 (0)	0
37	(Azerbaijan) Murad Mammadov	2026–	(-)	3 (1)	(-)	3 (1)	0.33
37	(Cameroon) Moumi Ngamaleu	2026–	(-)	1 (0)	2 (1)	3 (1)	0.33
40	(Brazil) Diogo Dall'Igna	2022–2025	(-)	1 (0)	1 (0)	2 (0)	0
40	(Netherlands) Jay Gorter	2025–	2 (0)	(-)	(-)	2 (0)	0
42	(Ghana) Patrick Twumasi	2023–2025	(-)	1 (0)	0 (0)	1 (0)	0
42	(Czech Republic) Josef Kvída	2020–2024	(-)	1 (0)	(-)	1 (0)	0
42	(Brazil) Pedrão	2025–	1 (0)	(-)	(-)	1 (0)	0
42	(Cyprus) Georgios Michael	2026–	1 (0)	(-)	(-)	1 (0)	0

=== Goalscorers ===
As of match played 5 November 2026

Rank	Player	Years	UEFA Champions League	UEFA Europa League	UEFA Conference League	Total	Ratio
1	(Brazil) Jajá	2024–2025; 2025–	2 (13)	0 (4)	4 (14)	6 (31)	0.19
1	(Cape Verde) João Correia	2024–	2 (9)	1 (3)	3 (18)	6 (30)	0.2
1	(Brazil) Anderson Silva	2024–2025; 2025–	2 (13)	0 (1)	4 (21)	6 (35)	0.17
4	Own goals	2024–	1 (14)	1 (6)	3 (21)	5 (41)	0.12
5	(Sweden) Muamer Tanković	2022–2025	0 (5)	0 (2)	4 (16)	4 (23)	0.17
5	(Romania) Vlad Dragomir	2021–	1 (14)	1 (6)	2 (20)	4 (40)	0.1
5	(Croatia) Mislav Oršić	2025–2026	2 (13)	0 (0)	1 (4)	4 (18)	0.22
5	(Brazil) Biel Teixeira	2026–	(-)	2 (4)	2 (3)	4 (7)	0.57
9	(Spain) David Goldar	2023–	0 (12)	1 (6)	2 (17)	3 (35)	0.09
9	(Brazil) Lelê	2026–	(-)	1 (4)	2 (5)	3 (9)	0.33
11	(Ghana) Derrick Luckassen	2024–2026	1 (14)	0 (0)	1 (15)	2 (29)	0.07
11	(Brazil) Bruno Felipe	2023–	1 (13)	0 (5)	1 (21)	2 (39)	0.05
13	(Argentina) Jonathan Silva	2024–2025	(-)	0 (0)	1 (7)	1 (7)	0.14
13	(Senegal) Moustapha Name	2022–2025	0 (0)	0 (2)	1 (10)	1 (12)	0.08
13	(Brazil) Jairo	2021–2025	(-)	0 (2)	1 (16)	1 (18)	0.06
13	(Republic of the Congo) Mons Bassouamina	2025–2026	1 (9)	(-)	0 (-)	1 (9)	0.11
13	(Portugal) Pêpê	2023–2024; 2024–	1 (14)	0 (4)	0 (17)	1 (35)	0.03
13	(Brazil) David Luiz	2025–	1 (7)	0 (4)	0 (5)	1 (16)	0.06
13	(Portugal) Guga	2026–	(-)	1 (4)	0 (5)	1 (9)	0.11
13	(Azerbaijan) Murad Mammadov	2026–	(-)	1 (3)	0 (0)	1 (3)	0.33
13	(Sweden) Ken Sema	2025–	0 (11)	0 (2)	1 (8)	1 (21)	0.05
13	(Cyprus) Nikolas Ioannou	2026–	(-)	0 (4)	1 (5)	1 (9)	0.11
13	(Cameroon) Moumi Ngamaleu	2026–	(-)	0 (1)	1 (2)	1 (3)	0.33

=== Clean sheets ===
As of match played 5 November 2026

Rank	Player	Years	UEFA Champions League	UEFA Europa League	UEFA Conference League	Total	Ratio
1	(Croatia) Ivica Ivušić	2023–2025	(-)	0 (2)	6 (15)	6 (17)	0.35
1	(Cyprus) Neofytos Michail	2024–2026	6 (12)	0 (0)	0 (1)	6 (13)	0.46
3	(Poland) Radosław Majecki	2026–	(-)	1 (4)	0 (5)	1 (9)	0.11
4	(Netherlands) Jay Gorter	2025–	0 (2)	0 (0)	0 (0)	0 (2)	0

== Overall record ==
=== By competition ===
As of match played 5 November 2026

Competition	Pld	W	D	L	GF	GA
UEFA Champions League	14	6	5	3	16	14
UEFA Europa League	6	1	1	4	9	14
UEFA Conference League	21	9	4	8	35	27
Total	41	16	10	15	60	55

=== By country ===
As of match played 5 November 2026

Country	Pld	W	D	L	GF	GA	GD	Win%
Albania	2	1	1	0	5	3	+2	50.00
Austria	2	0	1	1	3	4	−1	0.00
Bulgaria	2	1	0	1	5	2	+3	50.00
Croatia	2	1	0	1	4	2	+2	50.00
Cyprus	2	1	1	0	3	2	+1	50.00
Czech Republic	1	1	0	0	4	1	+3	100.00
England	1	0	0	1	0	1	−1	0.00
France	1	0	1	0	2	2	+0	0.00
Germany	2	0	0	2	1	6	−5	0.00
Greece	1	0	1	0	0	0	+0	0.00
Israel	2	1	1	0	2	1	+1	50.00
Italy	3	0	0	3	3	8	−5	0.00
Kazakhstan	2	1	1	0	1	0	+1	50.00
Latvia	1	0	1	0	1	1	+0	0.00
Lithuania	2	1	0	1	4	2	+2	50.00
Moldova	1	1	0	0	4	1	+3	100.00
Netherlands	1	0	0	1	1	3	−2	0.00
Romania	2	1	0	1	3	1	+2	50.00
Serbia	2	1	1	0	3	2	+1	50.00
Slovenia	1	1	0	0	2	0	+2	100.00
Spain	1	1	0	0	1	0	+1	100.00
Sweden	4	1	0	3	3	11	−8	25.00
Switzerland	1	0	1	0	2	2	+0	0.00
Ukraine	2	2	0	0	3	0	+3	100.00

=== By club ===
As of match played 5 November 2026

Opponent	Played	Won	Drawn	Lost	For	Against	Difference	Ratio
(Kazakhstan) Astana	1	1	0	0	1	0	+1	100.00
(Italy) Atalanta	1	0	0	1	1	3	−2	0.00
(Germany) Bayern Munich	1	0	0	1	1	5	−4	0.00
(Slovenia) Celje	1	1	0	0	2	0	+2	100.00
(England) Chelsea	1	0	0	1	0	1	−1	0.00
(Romania) CFR Cluj	2	1	0	1	3	1	+2	50.00
(Bulgaria) CSKA 1948	2	1	0	1	5	2	+3	50.00
(Albania) Dinamo City	2	1	1	0	5	3	+2	50.00
(Sweden) Djurgårdens IF	2	1	0	1	1	3	−2	50.00
(Ukraine) Dynamo Kyiv	2	2	0	0	3	0	+3	100.00
(Sweden) Elfsborg	2	0	0	2	2	8	−6	0.00
(Italy) Fiorentina	1	0	0	1	2	3	−1	0.00
(Croatia) Hajduk Split	2	1	0	1	4	2	+2	50.00
(Germany) 1. FC Heidenheim	1	0	0	1	0	1	−1	0.00
(Italy) Juventus	1	0	0	1	0	2	−2	0.00
(Kazakhstan) Kairat	1	0	1	0	0	0	+0	0.00
(Switzerland) Lugano	1	0	1	0	2	2	+0	0.00
(Israel) Maccabi Tel Aviv	2	1	1	0	2	1	+1	50.00
(France) Monaco	1	0	1	0	2	2	+0	0.00
(Greece) Olympiacos	1	0	1	0	0	0	+0	0.00
(Cyprus) Omonia	2	1	1	0	3	2	+1	50.00
(Moldova) Petrocub Hîncești	1	1	0	0	4	1	+3	100.00
(Austria) Red Bull Salzburg	2	0	1	1	3	4	−1	0.00
(Serbia) Red Star Belgrade	2	1	1	0	3	2	+1	50.00
(Latvia) Riga	1	0	1	0	1	1	+0	0.00
(Czech Republic) Slavia Prague	1	1	0	0	4	1	+3	100.00
(Netherlands) Twente	1	0	0	1	1	3	−2	0.00
(Spain) Villarreal	1	1	0	0	1	0	+1	100.00
(Lithuania) Žalgiris	2	1	0	1	4	2	+2	50.00
