= 2024–25 Pafos FC season =

Pafos
2024–25 season
- Owner: Pavel Gognidze
- Manager: Juan Carlos Carcedo
- Stadium: Stelios Kyriakides Stadium
- Cypriot First Division: 1st (champions)
- Cypriot Cup: Runners-up
- Cypriot Super Cup: Runners-up
- UEFA Europa League: First qualifying round
- UEFA Conference League: Round of 16
- Top goalscorer: League: Jairo (13); All: Anderson Silva (17)
- Highest home attendance: 7,200 (vs APOEL, 6 April 2025, Cypriot First Division)
- Lowest home attendance: 2,000 (vs Karmiotissa, 19 October 2024, Cypriot First Division)
- Average home league attendance: 4,861
| Home colours | Away colours |

The 2024–25 season was Pafos's 11th year in existence, and eighth season in the Cypriot First Division. Pafos won the league for the first time, were runners-up in both the Cypriot Cup and the Cypriot Super Cup, and reached the Round of 16 of the UEFA Conference League after dropping into the competition following defeat to Elfsborg in the first qualifying round of the UEFA Europa League.

== Season review ==
On 11 June, Pafos announced the signing of João Correia from Chaves.

On 12 June, Pafos announced that they had signed a new contract with Muamer Tanković.

On 14 June, Pafos announced that they had signed a professional contracts with academy graduates George Kolotas and Christos Evzonas.

On 16 June, Pafos announced the signing of Neofytos Michail from Anorthosis Famagusta.

On 17 June, Pafos announced the signing of Kostas Pileas from Panserraikos.

On 26 June, Pafos announced the signing of Marios Ilia from Ethnikos Achna.

On 10 July, Pafos announced the loan signing of Rafael Pontelo from Sporting CP.

On 13 July, Pafos announced the loan signing of Anderson Silva from Alanyaspor.

On 17 July, Pafos announced the permanent signing of Pêpê from Olympiacos.

On 20 July, Pafos announced the signing of Derrick Luckassen from Maccabi Tel Aviv.

On 20 July, Pafos announced the signing of Léo Natel from Corinthians.

On 1 August, Pafos announced the signing of Ivan Šunjić after he'd been released by Birmingham City.

On 6 August, Pafos announced the signing of Athanasios Papadoudis from Olympiacos.

On 31 August, Pafos announced the signing of Jonathan Silva from Getafe.

On 3 September, Pafos announced the signing of Domingos Quina from Udinese.

On 6 September, Pafos announced the loan signing of Mateo Tanlongo from Sporting CP.

On 10 September, Pafos announced the loan signing of Mehdi Boukamir from Sporting Charleroi.

On 22 January, Pafos announced the signing of Mislav Oršić from Trabzonspor.

On 23 January, Pafos announced that Léo Natel had left the club after his contract was ended by mutual agreement.

On 31 January, Pafos announced the signing of Ken Sema, who'd most recently played for Watford, and the signing of Zvonimir Šarlija from Hajduk Split on loan for the remainder of the season.

On 1 February, Pafos announced that Josef Kvída had left the club to sign for Apollon Limassol.

On 10 February, Pafos announced that the loan deal with Rafael Pontelo had been ended early.

On 12 February, Pafos announced that they had extended their contract with Bruno Felipe until the summer of 2027.

== Squad ==
As of match played 24 May 2025

| No. | Name | Nationality | Position | Date of birth (age) | Signed from | Signed in | Contract ends | Apps. | Goals |
Goalkeepers
| 1 | Ivica Ivušić | (Croatia) | GK | 1 February 1995 (aged 30) | NK Osijek | 2023 | | 111 | 0 |
| 93 | Neofytos Michail | (Cyprus) | GK | 16 December 1993 (aged 31) | Anorthosis Famagusta | 2024 | | 10 | 0 |
| 99 | Athanasios Papadoudis | (Greece) | GK | 6 September 2003 (aged 21) | Olympiacos | 2024 | | 1 | 0 |
Defenders
| 2 | Kostas Pileas | (Cyprus) | DF | 11 December 1998 (aged 26) | Panserraikos | 2024 | | 32 | 0 |
| 5 | David Goldar | (Spain) | DF | 15 September 1994 (aged 30) | Burgos | 2023 | | 84 | 12 |
| 19 | Jonathan Silva | (Argentina) | DF | 29 June 1994 (aged 30) | on loan from Getafe | 2024 | | 37 | 1 |
| 21 | Zvonimir Šarlija | (Croatia) | DF | 29 August 1996 (aged 28) | on loan from Hajduk Split | 2025 | 2025 | 21 | 0 |
| 23 | Derrick Luckassen | (Netherlands) | DF | 3 July 1995 (aged 29) | Maccabi Tel Aviv | 2024 | | 46 | 2 |
| 32 | Mehdi Boukamir | (Morocco) | DF | 26 January 2004 (aged 21) | on loan from Sporting Charleroi | 2024 | | 17 | 0 |
| 77 | João Correia | (Cape Verde) | DF | 5 September 1996 (aged 28) | Chaves | 2024 | | 49 | 10 |
Midfielders
| 8 | Domingos Quina | (Portugal) | MF | 18 November 1999 (aged 25) | Udinese | 2024 | | 35 | 2 |
| 12 | Ken Sema | (Sweden) | MF | 30 September 1993 (aged 31) | Unattached | 2024 | | 23 | 0 |
| 16 | Mateo Tanlongo | (Argentina) | MF | 12 August 2003 (aged 21) | on loan from Sporting CP | 2024 | | 27 | 2 |
| 26 | Ivan Šunjić | (Bosnia and Herzegovina) | MF | 9 October 1996 (aged 28) | Unattached | 2024 | | 51 | 4 |
| 30 | Vlad Dragomir | (Romania) | MF | 24 April 1999 (aged 26) | Virtus Entella | 2021 | | 150 | 17 |
| 80 | Christos Evzonas | (Cyprus) | MF | 21 April 2005 (aged 20) | Academy | 2024 | | 0 | 0 |
| 81 | George Kolotas | (Cyprus) | MF | 15 March 2006 (aged 19) | Academy | 2024 | | 0 | 0 |
| 88 | Pêpê | (Portugal) | MF | 20 May 1997 (aged 28) | Olympiacos | 2024 | | 86 | 5 |
Forwards
| 7 | Bruno Felipe | (Brazil) | FW | 26 May 1994 (aged 30) | Omonia | 2023 | 2027 | 104 | 6 |
| 10 | Jairo | (Brazil) | FW | 6 May 1992 (aged 33) | Hajduk Split | 2021 | | 162 | 60 |
| 11 | Jajá | (Brazil) | FW | 15 April 2001 (aged 24) | on loan from Athletico Paranaense | 2024 | 2025 | 67 | 11 |
| 17 | Mislav Oršić | (Croatia) | FW | 29 December 1992 (aged 32) | Trabzonspor | 2025 | | 19 | 4 |
| 22 | Muamer Tanković | (Sweden) | FW | 22 February 1995 (aged 30) | AEK Athens | 2022 | | 129 | 34 |
| 33 | Anderson Silva | (Brazil) | FW | 21 November 1997 (aged 27) | on loan from Alanyaspor | 2024 | | 57 | 17 |
| 70 | Marios Ilia | (Cyprus) | FW | 19 May 1996 (aged 29) | Ethnikos Achna | 2024 | | 13 | 0 |
| 84 | Kevin Nhaga | (Portugal) | FW | 24 July 2005 (aged 19) | Boavista | 2023 | | 1 | 0 |
Out on loan
| 6 | Pedro Pelágio | (Portugal) | MF | 21 April 2000 (aged 25) | Marítimo | 2023 | | 40 | 0 |
| 8 | Mamadou Kané | (Guinea) | MF | 22 January 1997 (aged 28) | Olympiacos | 2023 | 2026 | 54 | 3 |
| 24 | Onni Valakari | (Finland) | MF | 18 August 1999 (aged 25) | Tromsø | 2020 | 2026 | 158 | 46 |
| 25 | Moustapha Name | (Senegal) | MF | 5 May 1995 (aged 30) | Paris FC | 2022 | | 93 | 7 |
| | Khetag Kochiyev | (Russia) | DF | 18 December 1999 (aged 25) | Alania Vladikavkaz | 2023 | | 0 | 0 |
| | Patrick Twumasi | (Ghana) | FW | 9 May 1994 (aged 31) | Maccabi Netanya | 2023 | | 25 | 3 |
Left during the season
| 3 | Matías Melluso | (Argentina) | DF | 9 June 1998 (aged 26) | Gimnasia y Esgrima | 2023 | | 17 | 0 |
| 4 | Josef Kvída | (Czech Republic) | DF | 16 January 1997 (aged 28) | NEC Nijmegen | 2020 | 2026 | 136 | 4 |
| 9 | Léo Natel | (Brazil) | FW | 14 March 1997 (aged 28) | Corinthians | 2024 | | 20 | 1 |
| 34 | Diogo Dall'Igna | (Brazil) | MF | 22 February 2004 (aged 21) | Internacional | 2022 | 2026 (+1) | 12 | 1 |
| 45 | Rafael Pontelo | (Brazil) | DF | 22 January 2003 (aged 22) | on loan from Sporting CP | 2024 | | 8 | 0 |
| 55 | Antonio Cikač | (Croatia) | GK | 27 September 2005 (aged 19) | Sesvete | 2023 | | 0 | 0 |
| | Thierno Barry | (Guinea) | FW | 12 January 2000 (aged 25) | Tenerife B | 2023 | | 0 | 0 |

== Transfers ==
=== In ===
| Date | Position | Nationality | Name | From | Fee | Ref. |
|---|---|---|---|---|---|---|
| 16 June 2024 | GK | (Cyprus) | Neofytos Michail | Anorthosis Famagusta | Undisclosed | |
| 17 June 2024 | DF | (Cyprus) | Kostas Pileas | Panserraikos | Undisclosed | |
| 26 June 2024 | FW | (Cyprus) | Marios Ilia | Ethnikos Achna | Undisclosed | |
| 1 July 2024 | DF | (England) | Nikita Dubov | Akritas Chlorakas | Undisclosed | |
| 17 July 2024 | MF | (Portugal) | Pêpê | Olympiacos | Undisclosed | |
| 20 July 2024 | DF | (Netherlands) | Derrick Luckassen | Maccabi Tel Aviv | Undisclosed | |
| 31 July 2024 | FW | (Brazil) | Léo Natel | Corinthians | Undisclosed | |
| 1 August 2024 | MF | (Bosnia and Herzegovina) | Ivan Šunjić | Unattached | Free | |
| 6 August 2024 | GK | (Greece) | Athanasios Papadoudis | Olympiacos | Undisclosed | |
| 3 September 2024 | MF | (Portugal) | Domingos Quina | Udinese | Undisclosed | |
| 22 January 2025 | FW | (Croatia) | Mislav Oršić | Trabzonspor | Undisclosed | |
| 31 January 2025 | MF | (Sweden) | Ken Sema | Unattached | Free | |

=== Loans in ===
| Start date | Position | Nationality | Name | From | End date | Ref. |
|---|---|---|---|---|---|---|
| 31 January 2024 | FW | (Brazil) | Jajá | Athletico Paranaense | | |
| 10 July 2024 | DF | (Brazil) | Rafael Pontelo | Sporting CP | 10 February 2025 | |
| 13 July 2024 | FW | (Brazil) | Anderson Silva | Alanyaspor | | |
| 31 August 2024 | DF | (Argentina) | Jonathan Silva | Getafe | Undisclosed | |
| 6 September 2024 | MF | (Argentina) | Mateo Tanlongo | Sporting CP | | |
| 10 September 2024 | DF | (Morocco) | Mehdi Boukamir | Sporting Charleroi | | |
| 31 January 2025 | DF | (Croatia) | Zvonimir Šarlija | Hajduk Split | 30 June 2025 | |

=== Out ===
| Date | Position | Nationality | Name | To | Fee | Ref. |
|---|---|---|---|---|---|---|
| 22 August 2024 | FW | (Guinea) | Thierno Barry | Enosis Neon Paralimni | Undisclosed | |
| 1 February 2025 | DF | (Czech Republic) | Josef Kvída | Apollon Limassol | Undisclosed | |
| 18 February 2025 | GK | (Croatia) | Antonio Cikač | Karlovac 1919 | Undisclosed | |

=== Loans out ===
| Start date | Position | Nationality | Name | To | End date | Ref. |
|---|---|---|---|---|---|---|
| 15 July 2024 | DF | (England) | Nikita Dubov | Ethnikos Achna | End of season | |
| 23 July 2024 | FW | (Ghana) | Patrick Twumasi | Beitar Jerusalem | End of season | |
| 17 August 2024 | MF | (Portugal) | Pedro Pelágio | Chaves | End of season | |
| 23 August 2024 | MF | (Guinea) | Mamadou Kané | Rodina Moscow | 31 December 2024 | |
| 26 August 2024 | MF | (Finland) | Onni Valakari | AIK | 31 December 2024 | |
| 30 September 2024 | MF | (Brazil) | Diogo Dall'Igna | Enosis Neon Paralimni | 29 January 2025 | |
| 13 January 2025 | MF | (Finland) | Onni Valakari | San Diego FC | 31 December 2025 | |
| 4 February 2025 | MF | (Senegal) | Moustapha Name | CFR Cluj | 30 June 2025 | |
| 1 March 2025 | MF | (Guinea) | Mamadou Kané | Auda | End of season | |

=== Released ===
| Date | Position | Nationality | Name | Joined | Date | Ref |
|---|---|---|---|---|---|---|
| 31 December 2024 | DF | (Argentina) | Matías Melluso | Gimnasia y Esgrima | 24 January 2025 | |
| 23 January 2025 | FW | (Brazil) | Léo Natel | Grêmio Novorizontino | 10 February 2025 | |
| 29 January 2025 | MF | (Brazil) | Diogo Dall'Igna | | | |
| 27 May 2025 | FW | (Brazil) | Jairo | Johor Darul Ta'zim | 15 June 2025 | |

== Friendlies ==
| 23 June 2024 | Universitatea Craiova | 1–2 | Pafos | Wörgl, Austria |
| 19:00 EEST (UTC+3) | Koljić 6' | Report | Pelágio 12'; Twumasi 81' | Stadium: Sportstadion Wörgl |

| 28 June 2024 | Pafos | 5–0 | Ilirija 1911 | Austria |
| 19:00 EEST (UTC+3) | Jairo 14', 41'; Twumasi 45+2'; Bruno 49'; Tanković 55' (pen.) | Report |

| 30 June 2024 | Legia Warsaw | 0–1 | Pafos | Austria |
| 19:00 EEST (UTC+3) | | Report | Jairo 30' |

| 3 July 2024 | Pafos | 0–0 | Panathinaikos | Austria |
| 17:30 EEST (UTC+3) | | Report |

== Competitions ==
=== Overview ===
| Competition | First match | Last match | Starting round | Final position | Record | | | | | | | |
| Competition | First match | Last match | Starting round | Final position | Pld | W | D | L | GF | GA | GD | Win % |
|---|---|---|---|---|---|---|---|---|---|---|---|---|
| Cypriot First Division | 1 September 2024 | 18 May 2025 | Matchday 2 | Winners | 36 | 26 | 4 | 6 | 66 | 20 | +46 | 72.22 |
| Cypriot Cup | 15 January 2025 | 24 May 2025 | Second round | Runnersup | 5 | 2 | 3 | 0 | 8 | 4 | +4 | 40.00 |
| Super Cup | 25 September 2024 | 25 September 2024 | Final | Runnersup | 1 | 0 | 0 | 1 | 0 | 1 | −1 | 0.00 |
| UEFA Europa League | 11 July 2024 | 18 July 2024 | First Qualifying Round | First Qualifying Round | 2 | 0 | 0 | 2 | 2 | 8 | −6 | 0.00 |
| UEFA Conference League | 25 July 2024 | 13 March 2025 | Second Qualifying Round | Round of 16 | 16 | 8 | 2 | 6 | 27 | 17 | +10 | 50.00 |
| Total | | | | | 60 | 36 | 9 | 15 | 103 | 50 | +53 | 60.00 |

Last updated: 24 May 2025
Source: Competitions

=== Super Cup ===
| 25 September 2024 | APOEL | 1–0 | Pafos | Kolossi |
| 20:30 EEST (UTC+3) | Sarfo 1'; Tejera (yellow card) 16'; Chebake (yellow card) 43'; Petrović (yellow card) 62'; Marquinhos (yellow card) 86'; Bah (yellow card) 88' | Report | Luckassen (yellow card) 7'; Dragomir (red card) 13'; Tanković (yellow card) 35'; Anderson (yellow card) 90+3' | Stadium: Alphamega Stadium; Referee: Chrysovalantis Theouli |

=== Cypriot First Division ===
==== Regular season ====
===== League table =====
| Pos | Team | Pld | W | D | L | GF | GA | GD | Pts | Qualification or relegation |
|---|---|---|---|---|---|---|---|---|---|---|
| 1 | Pafos | 26 | 20 | 2 | 4 | 50 | 12 | +38 | 62 | Qualification for the Championship round |
| 2 | Aris Limassol | 26 | 18 | 7 | 1 | 53 | 15 | +38 | 61 | Qualification for the Championship round |
| 3 | AEK Larnaca | 26 | 16 | 6 | 4 | 45 | 21 | +24 | 54 | Qualification for the Championship round |
| 4 | Omonia | 26 | 16 | 4 | 6 | 53 | 26 | +27 | 52 | Qualification for the Championship round |
| 5 | APOEL | 26 | 12 | 7 | 7 | 52 | 25 | +27 | 43 | Qualification for the Championship round |

Source: Soccerway
Rules for classification: 1) Points; 2) Head-to-head points; 3) Head-to-head goal difference; 4) Head-to-head goals scored; 5) Head-to-head away goals scored (only if two teams); 6) Goal difference; 7) Goals scored; 8) Play-off (only if deciding championship round, relegation round or relegation).

===== Results summary =====
| Overall | | | | | | | | Home | | | | | | Away | | | | | |
| Pld | W | D | L | GF | GA | GD | Pts | W | D | L | GF | GA | GD | W | D | L | GF | GA | GD |
|---|---|---|---|---|---|---|---|---|---|---|---|---|---|---|---|---|---|---|---|
| 26 | 20 | 2 | 4 | 50 | 12 | +38 | 62 | 9 | 2 | 2 | 27 | 6 | +21 | 11 | 0 | 2 | 23 | 6 | +17 |

Last updated: 9 March 2025.
Source: Results

===== Results by results =====
| Matchday | 2 | 3 | 1 | 4 | 5 | 6 | 7 | 8 | 9 | 10 | 11 | 12 | 13 | 14 | 15 | 16 | 17 | 18 | 19 | 20 | 21 | 22 | 23 | 24 | 25 | 26 |
|---|---|---|---|---|---|---|---|---|---|---|---|---|---|---|---|---|---|---|---|---|---|---|---|---|---|---|
| Ground | A | H | H | A | H | A | H | A | H | A | H | H | A | A | H | A | H | A | H | A | H | A | H | A | A | H |
| Result | W | W | W | W | D | W | W | W | W | W | W | L | W | W | L | W | W | L | W | W | W | W | W | W | L | D |
| Position | 4 | 3 | 1 | 1 | 1 | 1 | 1 | 1 | 1 | 1 | 1 | 1 | 1 | 1 | 1 | 1 | 1 | 2 | 1 | 1 | 1 | 1 | 1 | 1 | 1 | 1 |

Updated to match(es) played on 9 March 2025. Source: Results
A = Away; H = Home; W = Win; D = Draw; L = Loss; P = Postponed
Notes:
- ^{1}

===== Results =====
| 1 September 2024 2 | AEK Larnaca | 0–2 | Pafos | Larnaca |
| 18:30 EEST (UTC+3) | Cabrera (yellow card) 82'; Angielski (yellow card) 89' | Report | Jairo 17'; Jajá (yellow card) 27'; Anderson 67'; Bruno (yellow card) 70'; Dragomir (yellow card) 85'; Léo Natel (yellow card) 90+5' | Stadium: AEK Arena; Attendance: 3,500; Referee: Antonio Menelaus |

| 14 September 2024 3 | Pafos | 3–1 | Anorthosis Famagusta | Paphos |
| 18:00 EEST (UTC+3) | Jairo 40'; Anderson 59'; Šunjić 67' (yellow card) 84'; Goldar (yellow card) 71'; Luckassen (yellow card) 90+1' | Report | Mugabi (yellow card) 32'; Kiko (yellow card) 78'; Rafael Lopes 80' | Stadium: Stelios Kyriakides Stadium; Attendance: 5,115; Referee: Mario Antoniou |

| 18 September 2024 1 | Pafos | 4–0 | Nea Salamis Famagusta | Paphos |
| 19:00 EEST (UTC+3) | Dragomir 8'; Jairo 36'; Pêpê 41'; Name (yellow card) 53'; Anderson 63' | Report | Frangos (yellow card) 5' | Stadium: Stelios Kyriakides Stadium; Attendance: 3,654; Referee: Andreas Argyrou |
Note: Match originally scheduled for 24 August 2024.

| 22 September 2024 4 | AEL Limassol | 1–3 | Pafos | Limassol |
| 19:00 EEST (UTC+3) | Frantzis (yellow card) 14'; Lesovoy 16'; Toku (yellow card) 53'; Avraham (yellow card) 58' | Report | Silva (yellow card) 43'; Jajá 82', 90+5'; Anderson 87'; Correia (yellow card) 90+3' | Stadium: Alphamega Stadium; Attendance: 5,000; Referee: Marios Christoforou |

| 29 September 2024 5 | Pafos | 1–1 | Aris Limassol | Paphos |
| 19:00 EEST (UTC+3) | Goldar 11'; Šunjić (yellow card) 22'; Name (yellow card) 60' | Report | Gomis 7' (yellow card) 20'; Sarfo (yellow card) 45+4'; Bengtsson (yellow card) 53'; Nikolić (yellow card) 81'; Vaná (yellow card) 90+4' | Stadium: Stelios Kyriakides Stadium; Attendance: 5,519; Referee: Constantinos Fellas |

| 6 October 2024 6 | Enosis Neon Paralimni | 1–2 | Pafos | Paralimni |
| 19:00 EEST (UTC+3) | Andreou 29'; Hoogenhout (yellow card) 35'; Mendy (yellow card) 56' (yellow-red card) 71'; Adeleye (yellow card) 81'; Janczukowicz (yellow card) 88' (yellow-red card) 90+7'; Corinus (yellow card) 90'; Sam (red card) 90+4'; Krainz (yellow card) 90+10' | Report | Silva (yellow card) 8'; Anderson (yellow card) 24'; Léo Natel (yellow card) 38'; Jairo 75'; Goldar 88' | Stadium: Paralimni Stadium; Attendance: 1,000; Referee: Andreas Argyrou |

| 19 October 2024 7 | Pafos | 4–0 | Karmiotissa | Paphos |
| 19:00 EEST (UTC+3) | Luckassen (yellow card) 21'; Jajá (yellow card) 38'; Dragomir 44'; Quina (yellow card) 45+2'; Jairo 48'; Tanković 50' (yellow card) 70'; Goldar 67' | Report | Antoniou (yellow card) 14'; Pozo (yellow card) 15'; Kovačević (yellow card) 45+2' | Stadium: Stelios Kyriakides Stadium; Attendance: 2,000; Referee: Antoniou Menelaos |

| 28 October 2024 8 | Omonia 29M | 1–2 | Pafos | Peristerona |
| 19:00 EET (UTC+2) | Trujić 9'; Deslandes (yellow card) 38'; Pikis (yellow card) 83' | Report | Jairo 20'; Šunjić 66'; Luckassen (yellow card) 83' | Stadium: Katokopia Stadium; Attendance: 500; Referee: Panagiotis Hadjigeorghiou |

| 3 November 2024 9 | Pafos | 4–0 | Omonia Aradippou | Paphos |
| 14:30 EET (UTC+2) | Jairo 3'; Goldar 10'; Šunjić (yellow card) 12'; Dragomir (yellow card) 23' (goal) 29'; Anderson 56' (yellow card) 67' | Report | Ferrier (yellow card) 31'; Antoniou (yellow card) 43'; Mekkaoui (yellow card) 67'; Theocharous (yellow card) 88' | Stadium: Stelios Kyriakides Stadium; Attendance: 2,178; Referee: Nikolas Liotatis |
Note: Match originally scheduled for 20:00 on 2 November, but postponed due to extreme weather.

| 10 November 2024 10 | Apollon Limassol | 0–1 | Pafos | Limassol |
| 19:00 EET (UTC+2) | Coll (yellow card) 11' | Report | Jairo (yellow card) 11'; Tanković (yellow card) 20'; Correia 60'; Luckassen (yellow card) 63'; Quina (yellow card) 90+10' | Stadium: Alphamega Stadium; Attendance: 4,000; Referee: Jakob Kehlet |

| 23 November 2024 11 | Pafos | 2–1 | APOEL | Paphos |
| 17:00 EET (UTC+2) | Tanković 50'; Correia 89' | Report | Dražić 61'; Laifis (yellow card) 75'; Belec (yellow card) 90+6'; Petrović (red card) 90+6' | Stadium: Stelios Kyriakides Stadium; Attendance: 7,032; Referee: Hélder Malheiro |

| 2 December 2024 12 | Pafos | 0–1 | AC Omonia | Paphos |
| 19:00 EET (UTC+2) | Jairo (yellow card) 65'; Dragomir (yellow card) 71'; Correia (yellow card) 82'; Luckassen (yellow card) 90'; Tanković (yellow card) 90+5'; Goldar (yellow card) 90+5' | Report | Semedo (yellow card) 72'; Jovetić 90+6' | Stadium: Stelios Kyriakides Stadium; Attendance: 6,722; Referee: Lionel Tschudi |

| 7 December 2024 13 | Ethnikos Achna | 0–2 | Pafos | Achna |
| 19:00 EET (UTC+2) | P.Ioannou (yellow card) 61'; González (yellow card) 72' | Report | Jairo 8'; Šunjić (yellow card) 33'; Goldar 38'; Dragomir (yellow card) 65' | Stadium: Dasaki Stadium; Referee: Antoniou Menelaos |
Note: Match was suspended in the 47th minute due to extreme weather conditions, and continued the follow day, 8 December 2024, at 14:30.

| 16 December 2024 14 | Nea Salamis Famagusta | 0–2 | Pafos | Larnaca |
| 19:00 EET (UTC+2) | Durmishaj (yellow card) 8' | Report | Quina 3'; Jairo 54'; Correia (yellow card) 65' | Stadium: Ammochostos Stadium; Attendance: 100; Referee: Marios Christoforou |

| 22 December 2024 15 | Pafos | 0–1 | AEK Larnaca | Paphos |
| 18:00 EET (UTC+2) | Šunjić (yellow card) 47'; Dragomir (yellow card) 69'; Pontelo (yellow card) 76' (yellow-red card) 85' | Report | Cabrera 17'; Miramón (yellow card) 20'; Ekpolo (yellow card) 38'; Pons (yellow card) 70' | Stadium: Stelios Kyriakides Stadium; Attendance: 5,696; Referee: Juan Luca Sacchi |

| 2 January 2025 16 | Anorthosis Famagusta | 0–2 | Pafos | Larnaca |
| 19:00 EET (UTC+2) | Roguljić (yellow card) 90+6' | Report | Tanković 47', 80'; Silva (yellow card) 90+3'; Boukamir (yellow card) 90+4' | Stadium: Antonis Papadopoulos Stadium; Attendance: 5,500; Referee: Antoniou Menelaos |

| 6 January 2025 17 | Pafos | 4–0 | AEL Limassol | Paphos |
| 19:00 EET (UTC+2) | Anderson 26', 72'; Jajá 54'; Léo Natel 85'; Bruno (yellow card) 90+1' | Report | Neophytou (yellow card) 31'; Costantini (yellow card) 45+3' | Stadium: Stelios Kyriakides Stadium; Attendance: 4,587; Referee: Marios Christoforou |

| 11 January 2025 18 | Aris Limassol | 1–0 | Pafos | Limassol |
| 19:00 EET (UTC+2) | Boakye (yellow card) 22'; Sarfo (yellow card) 55'; Goldson (yellow card) 56'; Nikolić 63'; Bengtsson (yellow card) 72' | Report | Bruno (yellow card) 56'; Pêpê (yellow card) 88'; Silva (yellow card) 90+1'; Goldar (yellow card) 90+5' | Stadium: Alphamega Stadium; Attendance: 3,000; Referee: Damian Sylwestrzak |

| 19 January 2025 19 | Pafos | 2–0 | Enosis Neon Paralimni | Paphos |
| 18:00 EET (UTC+2) | Anderson 13'; Bruno (yellow card) 30'; Correia (yellow card) 53'; Pileas (yellow card) 55'; Goldar 81' | Report | Souza (yellow card) 40'; Museliani (yellow card) 49'; Adeleye (yellow card) 58' | Stadium: Stelios Kyriakides Stadium; Attendance: 3,424; Referee: Kyriakos Athanasiou |

| 26 January 2025 20 | Karmiotissa | 0–2 | Pafos | Larnaca |
| 17:00 EET (UTC+2) | Kovačević (yellow card) 44'; Delmiro (red card) 49'; Hočko (yellow card) 59' | Report | Tanlongo (yellow card) 13'; Jajá 60'; Anderson 74'; Šunjić (yellow card) 81'; Nhaga (yellow card) 90' | Stadium: Ammochostos Stadium; Attendance: 800; Referee: Constantinos Fellas |

| 3 February 2025 21 | Pafos | 2–1 | Omonia 29M | Paphos |
| 17:00 EET (UTC+2) | Boukamir (yellow card) 25'; Silva (yellow card) 52'; Deslandes 54' (o.g.); Correia 60'; Dragomir (yellow card) 72' | Report | Fernández (yellow card) 35'; García 45' (yellow card) 51'; Bela (yellow card) 86' | Stadium: Stelios Kyriakides Stadium; Attendance: 3,300; Referee: Antonis Konstantinidis |

| 8 February 2025 22 | Omonia Aradippou | 0–2 | Pafos | Aradippou |
| 18:00 EET (UTC+2) | Fomba (yellow card) 27' (yellow-red card) 65' | Report | Anderson 18' (penalty missed) 28'; Dragomir 61'; Luckassen (yellow card) 79'; Šarlija (yellow card) 90+5' | Stadium: Antonis Papadopoulos Stadium; Attendance: 800; Referee: Kyriakos Athanasiou |

| 16 February 2025 23 | Pafos | 1–0 | Apollon Limassol | Paphos |
| 17:00 EET (UTC+2) | Pêpê 36'; Tanlongo (yellow card) 82' | Report | Duodu (yellow card) 73'; Lam (yellow card) 82' | Stadium: Stelios Kyriakides Stadium; Attendance: 4,800; Referee: Gustavo Fernandes Correia |

| 24 February 2025 24 | APOEL | 0–2 | Pafos | Nicosia |
| 19:00 EET (UTC+2) | Antoniou (yellow card) 45+2'; Cano (yellow card) 65'; Chebake (yellow card) 90' | Report | Tanlongo (yellow card) 45'; Pêpê (yellow card) 59'; Jairo 61'; Bruno (yellow card) 72'; Anderson 90+1' | Stadium: GSP Stadium; Attendance: 3,300; Referee: Radu Petrescu |

| 1 March 2025 25 | AC Omonia | 2–1 | Pafos | Nicosia |
| 19:00 EET (UTC+2) | Marić (yellow card) 15'; Helander 31'; Kakoullis (yellow card) 33'; Semedo (yellow card) 39'; Loizou (yellow card) 70'; Stępiński 85'; Ingebrigtsen (yellow card) 90+4' | Report | Luckassen (yellow card) 5'; Correia 10'; Šunjić (yellow card) 33'; Anderson (yellow card) 89' | Stadium: GSP Stadium; Attendance: 6,374; Referee: Srđan Jovanović |

| 9 March 2025 26 | Pafos | 0–0 | Ethnikos Achna | Paphos |
| 18:00 EET (UTC+2) | | Report | Panagiotou (yellow card) 62'; Pechlivanis (yellow card) 79' | Stadium: Stelios Kyriakides Stadium; Attendance: 4,000; Referee: Panagiotis Chatzigeorgiou |

==== Championship round ====
===== League table =====
| Pos | Team | Pld | W | D | L | GF | GA | GD | Pts | Qualification |
|---|---|---|---|---|---|---|---|---|---|---|
| 1 | Pafos (C) | 36 | 26 | 4 | 6 | 67 | 21 | +46 | 82 | Qualification for the Champions League second qualifying round |
| 2 | Aris Limassol | 36 | 22 | 9 | 5 | 66 | 31 | +35 | 75 | Qualification for the Conference League second qualifying round |
| 3 | Omonia | 36 | 20 | 8 | 8 | 69 | 40 | +29 | 68 | Qualification for the Conference League second qualifying round |
| 4 | AEK Larnaca | 36 | 19 | 11 | 6 | 58 | 30 | +28 | 68 | Qualification for the Europa League first qualifying round (Note: The winner of the 2024–25 Cypriot Cup (AEK Larnaca) qualified for the Europa League first qualifying round.) |
| 5 | APOEL | 36 | 14 | 11 | 11 | 59 | 36 | +23 | 53 | |
| 6 | Apollon Limassol | 36 | 12 | 10 | 14 | 37 | 39 | −2 | 46 | |

Source: Soccerway
Rules for classification: 1) Points; 2) Head-to-head points; 3) Head-to-head goal difference; 4) Head-to-head goals scored; 5) Head-to-head away goals scored (only if two teams); 6) Goal difference; 7) Goals scored; 8) Play-off (only if deciding championship round, relegation round or relegation).
(C) Champions

===== Results summary =====
| Overall | | | | | | | | Home | | | | | | Away | | | | | |
| Pld | W | D | L | GF | GA | GD | Pts | W | D | L | GF | GA | GD | W | D | L | GF | GA | GD |
|---|---|---|---|---|---|---|---|---|---|---|---|---|---|---|---|---|---|---|---|
| 10 | 6 | 2 | 2 | 17 | 9 | +8 | 20 | 4 | 0 | 1 | 11 | 2 | +9 | 2 | 2 | 1 | 6 | 7 | −1 |

Last updated: 18 May 2025.
Source: Results

===== Results by results =====
| Matchday | 27 | 28 | 29 | 30 | 31 | 32 | 33 | 34 | 35 | 36 |
|---|---|---|---|---|---|---|---|---|---|---|
| Ground | A | H | A | H | A | H | A | H | A | H |
| Result | W | W | W | L | D | W | L | W | D | W |
| Position | 1 | 1 | 1 | 1 | 1 | 1 | 1 | 1 | 1 | 1 |

Updated to match(es) played on 18 May 2025. Source: Results
A = Away; H = Home; W = Win; D = Draw; L = Loss; P = Postponed

===== Results =====
| 16 March 2025 27 | Apollon Limassol | 1–2 | Pafos | Limassol |
| 19:00 EET (UTC+2) | Duodu 46'; Vouros (yellow card) 61'; Santos (yellow card) 75'; Boli (yellow card) 90+1' | Report | Šarlija (yellow card) 21'; Jairo 45+9'; Luckassen 61'; Tanković (yellow card) 76' | Stadium: Alphamega Stadium; Attendance: 4,500; Referee: Novak Simović |

| 29 March 2025 28 | Pafos | 3–1 | AC Omonia | Paphos |
| 19:30 EEST (UTC+3) | Tanković 45+4' (pen.); Jairo 70'; Tanlongo 82' | Report | Bezus (yellow card) 12'; Marić (yellow card) 41'; Helander 90+4' | Stadium: Stelios Kyriakides Stadium; Attendance: 6,400; Referee: Walter Altmann |

| 2 April 2025 29 | Aris Limassol | 0–1 | Pafos | Limassol |
| 19:00 EEST (UTC+3) | Kokorin (yellow card) 27'; Mayambela (yellow card) 36'; Goldson (yellow card) 61' | Report | Pêpê 10'; Šunjić (yellow card) 70'; Luckassen (yellow card) 86' | Stadium: Alphamega Stadium; Attendance: 3,000; Referee: Morten Krogh Hansen |

| 6 April 2025 30 | Pafos | 0–1 | APOEL | Paphos |
| 18:00 EEST (UTC+3) | Correia (yellow card) 88'; Jairo (yellow card) 90+7'; Šarlija (yellow card) 90+9' | Report | Sarfo (yellow card) 46'; El-Arabi 78' (pen.); Bah (red card) 88' | Stadium: Stelios Kyriakides Stadium; Attendance: Luca Massimi; Referee: 7,200 |

| 13 April 2025 31 | AEK Larnaca | 2–2 | Pafos | Larnaca |
| 19:00 EEST (UTC+3) | Faraj (yellow card) 26'; Ledes (yellow card) 39'; Cantalapiedra 45+3'; Rohdén 58'; Gnali (yellow card) 71'; Cabrera (yellow card) 83' | Report | Tanković 24' (yellow card) 69'; Šunjić 41'; Bruno (yellow card) 48'; Correia (yellow card) 70' | Stadium: AEK Arena; Attendance: 3,200; Referee: Georgi Kabakov |

| 22 April 2025 32 | Pafos | 2–0 | Apollon Limassol | Paphos |
| 19:00 EEST (UTC+3) | Correia 36', 40'; Tanković (yellow card) 60'; Šunjić (yellow card) 71'; Šarlija (yellow card) 90+3'; Quina (yellow card) 90+4' | Report | Duodu (yellow card) 13'; Lam (yellow card) 43'; Sagal (yellow card) 49'; Vouros (yellow card) 58'; Weissbeck (yellow card) 74' | Stadium: Stelios Kyriakides Stadium; Attendance: 6,148; Referee: Daniel Schlager |

| 26 April 2025 33 | AC Omonia | 3–0 | Pafos | Nicosia |
| 19:00 EEST (UTC+3) | Semedo 14', 51'; Ewandro 21' (yellow card) 29'; Charalampous (yellow card) 36' | Report | Silva (yellow card) 29'; Šunjić (yellow card) 35'; Quina (red card) 59' | Stadium: GSP Stadium; Attendance: 5,800; Referee: Mikkel Redder |

| 4 May 2025 34 | Pafos | 4–0 | Aris Limassol | Paphos |
| 19:00 EEST (UTC+3) | J.Correia 9'; Dragomir 37'; Jairo 51'; Silva (yellow card) 57'; Goldar (yellow card) 60'; Ivušić (yellow card) 63'; Pêpê (yellow card) 69'; Luckassen (yellow card) 70'; Oršić 82'; Tanlongo (yellow card) 85' | Report | Urošević (yellow card) 31'; A.Correia (yellow card) 34'; Yago (yellow card) 43'; Kokorin (yellow card) 45+4'; Kvilitaia (yellow card) 70'; Montnor (yellow card) 79'; Caju (yellow card) 85' | Stadium: Stelios Kyriakides Stadium; Attendance: 7,300; Referee: Luca Cibelli |

| 12 May 2025 35 | APOEL | 1–1 | Pafos | Nicosia |
| 19:00 EEST (UTC+3) | Meyer 61'; Marquinhos (penalty missed) 83' | Report | Anderson (yellow card) 48'; Bruno 65'; Šarlija (yellow card) 73' | Stadium: GSP Stadium; Attendance: 4,000; Referee: Panagiotis Chatzigeorgiou |

| 18 May 2025 36 | Pafos | 2–0 | AEK Larnaca | Paphos |
| 19:00 EEST (UTC+3) | Šunjić 10'; Oršić (yellow card) 34'; Goldar (yellow card) 42'; Quina 67'; Sema (yellow card) 81' | Report | Angielski (yellow card) 69' | Stadium: Stelios Kyriakides Stadium; Referee: Ioannis Christodoulou |

=== Cypriot Cup ===
| 15 January 2025 Second round | Pafos | 1–1 (a.e.t.) (5–4 p) | Aris Limassol | Paphos |
| 19:00 EEST (UTC+3) | Jairo 27'; Silva (yellow card) 60'; Dragomir (yellow card) 67'; Goldar (yellow card) 80'; Bruno (yellow card) 98' (yellow-red card) 120'; Tanković (yellow card) 110' | Report | Kokorin (yellow card) 19'; Gomis 82' (yellow card) 105' | Stadium: Stelios Kyriakides Stadium; Referee: Srđan Jovanović |
| | Penalties |
| | Anderson (penalty scored); Léo Natel (penalty scored); Tanković (penalty scored); Goldar (penalty scored); Pêpê (penalty scored) | | (penalty scored) Kokorin; (penalty scored) Struski; (penalty scored) Boakye; (penalty scored) Semedo; (penalty missed) Gomis |

| 30 January 2025 Quarter-final | APOEL | 1–1 (a.e.t.) (4–5 p) | Pafos | Nicosia |
| 19:00 EEST (UTC+3) | Maioli (yellow card) 13' (goal) 39'; Galanopoulos (yellow card) 50'; Dražić (yellow card) 55'; Tejera (yellow card) 77'; Marquinhos (yellow card) 83'; Chebake (yellow card) 87'; Petrović (yellow card) 113' | Report | Jajá (yellow card) 50'; Luckassen (yellow card) 52' (yellow-red card) 120+3'; Silva (yellow card) 55'; Anderson 65' (pen.); Correia (yellow card) 88'; Pêpê (yellow card) 120+1' | Stadium: GSP Stadium; Referee: Manfredas Lukjančukas |
| | Penalties |
| | Pizzi (penalty scored); Marquinhos (penalty scored); Chebake (penalty scored); Sotiriou (penalty scored); Abagna (penalty missed); Laifis (penalty missed) | | (penalty missed) Jajá; (penalty scored) Name; (penalty scored) Ilia; (penalty scored) Oršić; (penalty scored) Pêpê; (penalty scored) Pileas |

| 30 April 2025 Semi-final 1st leg | Pafos | 4–2 | Apollon Limassol | Paphos |
| 19:00 EEST (UTC+3) | Anderson (yellow card) 6' (goal) 13'; Šunjić (yellow card) 21'; Dragomir 41'; Oršić 59', 70' | Report | De Marco (yellow card) 11'; Sagal 15'; D'Almeida (yellow card) 33'; Weissbeck (yellow card) 37'; Lam (yellow card) 57'; Šarlija 74' (o.g.) | Stadium: Stelios Kyriakides Stadium; Referee: Danny Makkelie |

| 7 May 2025 Semi-final 2nd leg | Apollon Limassol | 0–2 (2–6 agg.) | Pafos | Limassol |
| 19:00 EEST (UTC+3) | Vouros (yellow card) 45+4'; Malekkidis (yellow card) 56' (yellow-red card) 61'; Sagal (yellow card) 76' | Report | Tanlongo 59'; Anderson 89' | Stadium: Alphamega Stadium; Referee: Damian Sylwestrzak |

| 24 May 2025 Final | AEK Larnaca | 0–0 (a.e.t.) (5 – 4 p) | Pafos | Nicosia |
| 20:00 EEST (UTC+3) | Roberge (yellow card) 81'; Miličević (yellow card) 103' | Report | Šarlija (yellow card) 52'; Bruno (yellow card) 88' | Stadium: GSP Stadium; Referee: Daniel Siebert |
| | Penalties |
| | Miličević (penalty scored); Angielski (penalty scored); Cantalapiedra (penalty missed); Gama (penalty scored); Ledes (penalty scored); Ángel (penalty scored) | | Oršić (penalty scored); Anderson (penalty scored); Tanković (penalty scored); Jajá (penalty scored); Goldar (penalty missed); Quina (penalty missed) |

=== UEFA Europa League ===
==== Qualifying rounds ====
| 11 July 2024 First qualifying round 1st leg | Elfsborg (Sweden) | 3-0 | (Cyprus) Pafos | Borås Sweden |
| 20:00 EEST (UTC+3) | B.Zeneli 9'; Ouma (yellow card) 13'; A.Zeneli (penalty missed) 59'; Hult 59'; Frick 82'; Baldursson (yellow card) 90+5' | Report | Melluso (yellow card) 26' (yellow-red card) 57'; Jairo (yellow card) 38' | Stadium: Borås Arena; Attendance: 5,011; Referee: Helgi Mikael Jónasson (Iceland) |

| 18 July 2024 First qualifying round 2nd leg | Pafos (Cyprus) | 2-5 (2-8 agg.) | (Sweden) Elfsborg | Limassol, Cyprus |
| 19:00 EEST (UTC+3) | Correia (red card) 15'; Holmén 25' (o.g.); Dragomir 43'; Name (yellow card) 56' | Report | Kaib (yellow card) 2'; Ouma (yellow card) 17' (goal) 23'; Baldursson (yellow card) 36' (goal) 48'; Henriksson (yellow card) 41'; Baidoo 47'; Abdullai 58'; A. Zeneli 85' | Stadium: Alphamega Stadium; Attendance: 3,952; Referee: Gai Leibovitz (Israel) |
Note: Pafos played their home match at the Alphamega Stadium in Limassol, instead of their regular stadium, the Stelios Kyriakides Stadium, in Paphos, which did not meet UEFA requirements.

=== UEFA Conference League ===
==== Qualifying rounds ====
| 25 July 2024 Second qualifying round 1st leg | Žalgiris (Lithuania) | 2-1 | (Cyprus) Pafos | Vilnius, Lithuania |
| 19:00 EEST (UTC+3) | Antal 17', 26'; Golubickas (yellow card) 61'; Tordai (yellow card) 74'; Larsson (yellow card) 90'; Hodžić (yellow card) 90+5' | Report | Pelágio (yellow card) 57'; Moutachy 62' (o.g.); Dall'Igna (yellow card) 90+6'; Bruno (yellow card) 90+9' | Stadium: LFF Stadium; Attendance: 3,865; Referee: Kristoffer Hagenes (Norway) |

| 1 August 2024 Second qualifying round 2nd leg | Pafos (Cyprus) | 3-0 (a.e.t.) (4-2 agg.) | (Lithuania) Žalgiris | Limassol, Cyprus |
| 19:00 EEST (UTC+3) | Tanković 21'; Anderson 101'; Dragomir 118' | Report | Zahary (red card) 37'; Moutachy (yellow card) 67'; Kendysh (yellow card) 105' | Stadium: Alphamega Stadium; Attendance: 3,223; Referee: Stefan Ebner (Austria) |
Note: Pafos played their home match at the Alphamega Stadium in Limassol, instead of their regular stadium, the Stelios Kyriakides Stadium, in Paphos, which did not meet UEFA requirements.

| 8 August 2024 Third qualifying round 1st leg | CSKA 1948 (Bulgaria) | 2-1 | (Cyprus) Pafos | Sofia, Bulgaria |
| 20:30 EEST (UTC+3) | Ilievski 29'; Thalis 51' (pen.) (yellow card) 59' | Report | Tanković 10' | Stadium: Vasil Levski National Stadium; Attendance: 879; Referee: Denys Shurman (Ukraine) |
Note: CSKA 1948 played their home match at the Vasil Levski National Stadium, instead of their regular stadium, the Stadion Bistritsa, which did not meet UEFA requirements.

| 15 August 2024 Third qualifying round 2nd leg | Pafos (Cyprus) | 4-0 (5-2 agg.) | (Bulgaria) CSKA 1948 | Limassol, Cyprus |
| 19:00 EEST (UTC+3) | Tanković (yellow card) 60'; Goldar (yellow card) 76'; Anderson (yellow card) 90+3' (goal) 100'; Luckassen 90+7'; Jajá 94'; Daskalov 118' (o.g.) | Report | Daskalov (yellow card) 4'; Karagaren (yellow card) 5'; Furtado (yellow card) 33' (yellow-red card) 45+2'; Kirilov (yellow card) 45+2'; Cassiano (yellow card) 81'; Marinov (yellow card) 90+6'; Markov (yellow card) 110'; Ivanov (yellow card) 117' | Stadium: Alphamega Stadium; Attendance: 2,871; Referee: Lothar D'hondt (Belgium) |
Note: Pafos played their home match at the Alphamega Stadium in Limassol, instead of their regular stadium, the Stelios Kyriakides Stadium, in Paphos, which did not meet UEFA requirements.

| 22 August 2024 Playoff round 1st leg | CFR Cluj (Romania) | 1-0 | (Cyprus) Pafos | Cluj-Napoca, Romania |
| 20:30 EEST (UTC+3) | Korenica 17'; Deac (red card) 40'; Boben (yellow card) 45+1'; Bîrligea (yellow card) 59'; Tachtsidis (yellow card) 59'; Popa (yellow card) 90+4'; Camora (yellow card) 90+5' | Report | Pêpê (yellow card) 35'; Jairo (yellow card) 88'; Goldar (yellow card) 90+1'; Luckassen (yellow card) 90+2' | Stadium: Dr. Constantin Rădulescu Stadium; Attendance: 5,826; Referee: Novak Simović (Serbia) |

| 29 August 2024 Third qualifying round 2nd leg | Pafos (Cyprus) | 3-0 (3-1 agg.) | (Romania) CFR Cluj | Limassol, Cyprus |
| 20:00 EEST (UTC+3) | Jajá 28'; Goldar 31' (yellow card) 60'; Tanković 49' (pen.); Bruno (yellow card) 69'; Dragomir (yellow card) 74' | Report | Popa (yellow card) 35'; Tachtsidis (yellow card) 67'; Kamara (yellow card) 83' | Stadium: Alphamega Stadium; Attendance: 4,336; Referee: Craig Pawson (England) |
Note: Pafos played their home match at the Alphamega Stadium in Limassol, instead of their regular stadium, the Stelios Kyriakides Stadium, in Paphos, which did not meet UEFA requirements.

==== League phase ====
| Pos | Team | Pld | W | D | L | GF | GA | GD | Pts | Qualification |
|---|---|---|---|---|---|---|---|---|---|---|
| 10 | (Football Association of Ireland) Shamrock Rovers | 6 | 3 | 2 | 1 | 12 | 9 | +3 | 11 | Advance to knockout phase play-offs (seeded) |
| 11 | (Cyprus Football Association) APOEL | 6 | 3 | 2 | 1 | 8 | 5 | +3 | 11 | Advance to knockout phase play-offs (seeded) |
| 12 | (Cyprus Football Association) Pafos | 6 | 3 | 1 | 2 | 11 | 7 | +4 | 10 | Advance to knockout phase play-offs (seeded) |
| 13 | (Hellenic Football Federation) Panathinaikos | 6 | 3 | 1 | 2 | 10 | 7 | +3 | 10 | Advance to knockout phase play-offs (seeded) |
| 14 | (Football Association of Slovenia) Olimpija Ljubljana | 6 | 3 | 1 | 2 | 7 | 6 | +1 | 10 | Advance to knockout phase play-offs (seeded) |

Source: UEFA
Rules for classification: League phase tiebreakers

| Round | 1 | 2 | 3 | 4 | 5 | 6 |
|---|---|---|---|---|---|---|
| Ground | A | H | H | A | H | A |
| Result | W | L | W | L | W | D |
| Position | 3 | 14 | 9 | 16 | 12 | 12 |

Updated to match(es) played on 19 December 2024. Source: Results
A = Away; H = Home; W = Win; D = Draw; L = Loss

| 3 October 2024 1 | Petrocub Hîncești (Moldova) | 1-4 | (Cyprus) Pafos | Chișinău, Moldova |
| 22:00EEST (UTC+3) | Lungu 26' (pen.); Jardan (yellow card) 86' | Report | Correia 33', 52'; Jajá 37'; Name 82' (yellow card) 82'; Silva (yellow card) 90+1' | Stadium: Zimbru Stadium; Attendance: 3,148; Referee: Mikkel Redder (Denmark) |
Note: Petrocub Hîncești

| 24 October 2024 2 | Pafos (Cyprus) | 0-1 | (Germany) 1. FC Heidenheim | Limassol, Cyprus |
| 22:00 EEST (UTC+3) | Luckassen (yellow card) 55' | Report | Mainka 25'; Dorsch (yellow card) 46' | Stadium: Alphamega Stadium; Attendance: 2,511; Referee: Jasper Vergoote (Belgium) |
Note: Pafos will play their home matches at the Alphamega Stadium, Limassol, instead of their regular stadium, Stelios Kyriakides Stadium, Paphos, which did not meet UEFA requirements.

| 7 November 2024 3 | Pafos (Cyprus) | 1-0 | (Kazakhstan) Astana | Limassol, Cyprus |
| 19:45 EEST (UTC+3) | Anderson 87' | Report | Kuat (yellow card) 42'; Seysen (yellow card) 52' | Stadium: Alphamega Stadium; Attendance: 3,062; Referee: Don Robertson (Scotland) |
Note: Pafos will play their home matches at the Alphamega Stadium, Limassol, instead of their regular stadium, Stelios Kyriakides Stadium, Paphos, which did not meet UEFA requirements.

| 28 November 2024 4 | Fiorentina (Italy) | 3-2 | (Cyprus) Pafos | Florence, Italy |
| 22:00 EET (UTC+2) | Kouamé 38'; Goldar 53' (o.g.); Parisi (yellow card) 60'; Martínez Quarta 72'; Rubino (yellow card) 90+5' | Report | Šunjić (yellow card) 43'; Pêpê (yellow card) 60'; Jairo 68'; Correia (yellow card) 73'; Bruno (yellow card) 83'; Jajá 87' | Stadium: Stadio Artemio Franchi; Attendance: 11,145; Referee: Espen Eskås (Norway) |

| 12 December 2024 5 | Pafos (Cyprus) | 2-0 | (Slovenia) Celje | Limassol, Cyprus |
| 22:00 EET (UTC+2) | Luckassen (yellow card) 23'; Correia (yellow card) 28'; Pileas (yellow card) 36'; Dragomir 48'; Correia 63'; Name (yellow card) 90+1' | Report | Svetlin (yellow card) 17'; Zabukovnik (penalty missed) 24' | Stadium: Alphamega Stadium; Attendance: 2,051; Referee: Paweł Raczkowski (Poland) |
Note: Pafos will play their home matches at the Alphamega Stadium, Limassol, instead of their regular stadium, Stelios Kyriakides Stadium, Paphos, which did not meet UEFA requirements.

| 19 December 2024 6 | Lugano (Switzerland) | 2-2 | (Cyprus) Pafos | Thun, Switzerland |
| 22:00 EET (UTC+2) | Mahmoud 7' (yellow card) 90+1'; Bottani 33' (yellow card) 45+1'; Bislimi (yellow card) 70'; Grgić (yellow card) 90+4'; Przybyłko (yellow card) 90+6' | Report | Saipi 4' (o.g.); Tanković (yellow card) 26'; Correia (yellow card) 29'; Luckassen (yellow card) 74'; Goldar 90+5'; Quina (yellow card) 90+6' | Stadium: Stockhorn Arena; Attendance: 1,795; Referee: Nenad Minaković (Serbia) |
Note: Lugano will play their home matches at Stockhorn Arena, Thun, instead of their regular stadium, Cornaredo Stadium, Lugano, due to renovation work.

==== Knockout phase ====
| 13 February 2025 Play-offs 1st leg | AC Omonia (Cyprus) | 1–1 | (Cyprus) Pafos | Nicosia, Cyprus |
| 22:00 EET (UTC+2) | Kakoullis (yellow card) 5'; Semedo 51' (pen.); Jovetić (yellow card) 68' | Report | Tanković (yellow card) 5' (penalty missed) 74'; Silva (yellow card) 49'; Goldar (yellow card) 79'; Oršić 84' | Stadium: GSP Stadium; Attendance: 13,787; Referee: Simone Sozza (Italy) |

| 20 February 2025 Play-offs 2nd leg | Pafos (Cyprus) | 2–1 (3-2 agg.) | (Cyprus) AC Omonia | Limassol, Cyprus |
| 19:45 EET (UTC+2) | Bruno 28'; Silva 46'; Šunjić (yellow card) 90+4' | Report | Jovetić 60' (yellow card) 89'; Coulibaly (yellow card) 90+3' | Stadium: Alphamega Stadium; Attendance: 5,350; Referee: Clément Turpin (France) |
Note: Pafos will play their home matches at the Alphamega Stadium, Limassol, instead of their regular stadium, Stelios Kyriakides Stadium, Paphos, which did not meet UEFA requirements.

| 6 March 2025 Round of 16 1st leg | Pafos (Cyprus) | 1–0 | (Sweden) Djurgården | Limassol, Cyprus |
| 22:00 EET (UTC+2) | Tanković 65'; Luckassen (yellow card) 85'; Pileas (yellow card) 90+2' | Report | Žugelj (yellow card) 71'; Danielson (yellow card) 90+8' | Stadium: Alphamega Stadium; Attendance: 3,809; Referee: Giorgi Kruashvili (Georgia) |
Note: Pafos will play their home matches at the Alphamega Stadium, Limassol, instead of their regular stadium, Stelios Kyriakides Stadium, Paphos, which did not meet UEFA requirements.

| 13 March 2025 Round of 16 2nd leg | Djurgården (Sweden) | 3–0 (3–1 agg.) | (Cyprus) Pafos | Stockholm, Sweden |
| 19:45 EET (UTC+2) | Fallenius 35'; Nguen (yellow card) 68' (goal) 86'; Stensson 69' (yellow card) 85'; Schüller (yellow card) 80' | Report | Sema (yellow card) 48'; Correia (yellow card) 52'; Šunjić (yellow card) 57'; Luckassen (yellow card) 60'; Tanković (yellow card) 61'; Silva (yellow card) 82'; Pêpê (yellow card) 90+3' | Stadium: 3Arena; Attendance: 17,653; Referee: Sebastian Gishamer (Austria) |

== Squad statistics ==
As of match played 24 May 2025

=== Appearances and goals ===
| No. | Pos | Nat | Player | Total | | Cypriot First Division | | Cypriot Cup | | Super Cup | | UEFA Europa League | | UEFA Conference League | |
| No. | Pos | Nat | Player | Apps | Goals | Apps | Goals | Apps | Goals | Apps | Goals | Apps | Goals | Apps | Goals |
|---|---|---|---|---|---|---|---|---|---|---|---|---|---|---|---|
| 1 | GK | (Croatia) CRO | Ivica Ivušić | 50 | 0 | 27 | 0 | 5 | 0 | 1 | 0 | 2 | 0 | 15 | 0 |
| 2 | DF | (Cyprus) CYP | Kostas Pileas | 32 | 0 | 5+10 | 0 | 0+3 | 0 | 0+1 | 0 | 1+1 | 0 | 4+7 | 0 |
| 5 | DF | (Spain) ESP | David Goldar | 51 | 8 | 26+3 | 6 | 3+1 | 0 | 1 | 0 | 2 | 0 | 15 | 2 |
| 7 | FW | (Brazil) BRA | Bruno Felipe | 56 | 2 | 30+3 | 1 | 4 | 0 | 1 | 0 | 2 | 0 | 16 | 1 |
| 8 | MF | (Portugal) POR | Domingos Quina | 35 | 2 | 9+16 | 2 | 0+3 | 0 | 0 | 0 | 0 | 0 | 1+6 | 0 |
| 10 | FW | (Brazil) BRA | Jairo | 59 | 15 | 28+7 | 13 | 4+1 | 1 | 1 | 0 | 2 | 0 | 15+1 | 1 |
| 11 | FW | (Brazil) BRA | Jajá | 49 | 8 | 14+15 | 4 | 0+3 | 0 | 1 | 0 | 1+1 | 0 | 7+7 | 4 |
| 12 | MF | (Sweden) SWE | Ken Sema | 23 | 0 | 7+9 | 0 | 2+1 | 0 | 0 | 0 | 0 | 0 | 2+2 | 0 |
| 16 | MF | (Argentina) ARG | Mateo Tanlongo | 27 | 2 | 9+15 | 1 | 1+2 | 1 | 0 | 0 | 0 | 0 | 0 | 0 |
| 17 | FW | (Croatia) CRO | Mislav Oršić | 19 | 4 | 7+4 | 1 | 2+2 | 2 | 0 | 0 | 0 | 0 | 0+4 | 1 |
| 19 | DF | (Argentina) ARG | Jonathan Silva | 37 | 1 | 23+3 | 0 | 3+1 | 0 | 0 | 0 | 0 | 0 | 7 | 1 |
| 21 | DF | (Croatia) CRO | Zvonimir Šarlija | 21 | 0 | 10+4 | 0 | 3 | 0 | 0 | 0 | 0 | 0 | 2+2 | 0 |
| 22 | FW | (Sweden) SWE | Muamer Tanković | 56 | 10 | 28+4 | 6 | 5 | 0 | 1 | 0 | 2 | 0 | 16 | 4 |
| 23 | DF | (Netherlands) NED | Derrick Luckassen | 46 | 2 | 25+2 | 1 | 3 | 0 | 1 | 0 | 0 | 0 | 14+1 | 1 |
| 26 | MF | (Bosnia and Herzegovina) BIH | Ivan Šunjić | 51 | 4 | 27+4 | 4 | 4+1 | 0 | 1 | 0 | 0 | 0 | 11+3 | 0 |
| 30 | MF | (Romania) ROU | Vlad Dragomir | 56 | 9 | 30+2 | 5 | 5 | 1 | 1 | 0 | 2 | 1 | 16 | 2 |
| 32 | DF | (Morocco) MAR | Mehdi Boukamir | 17 | 0 | 13+2 | 0 | 2 | 0 | 0 | 0 | 0 | 0 | 0 | 0 |
| 33 | FW | (Brazil) BRA | Anderson Silva | 57 | 17 | 9+26 | 11 | 2+3 | 3 | 0+1 | 0 | 0 | 0 | 1+15 | 3 |
| 70 | FW | (Cyprus) CYP | Marios Ilia | 13 | 0 | 0+6 | 0 | 0+1 | 0 | 0 | 0 | 0+2 | 0 | 0+4 | 0 |
| 77 | DF | (Cape Verde) CPV | João Correia | 49 | 10 | 22+8 | 7 | 3 | 0 | 0+1 | 0 | 2 | 0 | 8+5 | 3 |
| 84 | FW | (Portugal) POR | Kevin Nhaga | 1 | 0 | 0+1 | 0 | 0 | 0 | 0 | 0 | 0 | 0 | 0 | 0 |
| 88 | MF | (Portugal) POR | Pêpê | 54 | 3 | 31+3 | 3 | 4+1 | 0 | 1 | 0 | 0 | 0 | 13+1 | 0 |
| 93 | GK | (Cyprus) CYP | Neofytos Michail | 10 | 0 | 8 | 0 | 0+1 | 0 | 0 | 0 | 0 | 0 | 1 | 0 |
| 99 | GK | (Greece) GRE | Athanasios Papadoudis | 1 | 0 | 1 | 0 | 0 | 0 | 0 | 0 | 0 | 0 | 0 | 0 |
Players away on loan:
| 6 | MF | (Portugal) POR | Pedro Pelágio | 6 | 0 | 0 | 0 | 0 | 0 | 0 | 0 | 2 | 0 | 2+2 | 0 |
| 24 | MF | (Finland) FIN | Onni Valakari | 7 | 0 | 0 | 0 | 0 | 0 | 0 | 0 | 0+2 | 0 | 1+4 | 0 |
| 25 | MF | (Senegal) SEN | Moustapha Name | 27 | 1 | 2+11 | 0 | 0+1 | 0 | 0+1 | 0 | 2 | 0 | 4+6 | 1 |
| 27 | FW | (Ghana) GHA | Patrick Twumasi | 1 | 0 | 0 | 0 | 0 | 0 | 0 | 0 | 0+1 | 0 | 0 | 0 |
Players who appeared for Pafos but left during the season:
| 3 | DF | (Argentina) ARG | Matías Melluso | 4 | 0 | 0 | 0 | 0 | 0 | 0 | 0 | 1 | 0 | 3 | 0 |
| 4 | DF | (Czech Republic) CZE | Josef Kvída | 1 | 0 | 0 | 0 | 0 | 0 | 0 | 0 | 1 | 0 | 0 | 0 |
| 9 | FW | (Brazil) BRA | Léo Natel | 20 | 1 | 3+10 | 1 | 0+1 | 0 | 0+1 | 0 | 0 | 0 | 0+5 | 0 |
| 34 | MF | (Brazil) BRA | Diogo Dall'Igna | 3 | 0 | 0+1 | 0 | 0 | 0 | 0 | 0 | 0+1 | 0 | 0+1 | 0 |
| 45 | DF | (Brazil) BRA | Rafael Pontelo | 8 | 0 | 2+2 | 0 | 0 | 0 | 1 | 0 | 0 | 0 | 2+1 | 0 |

=== Goal scorers ===
| Place | Position | Nation | Number | Name | Cypriot First Division | Cypriot Cup | Super Cup | UEFA Europa League | UEFA Conference League | Total |
|---|---|---|---|---|---|---|---|---|---|---|
| 1 | FW | (Brazil) | 33 | Anderson Silva | 11 | 3 | 0 | 0 | 3 | 17 |
| 2 | FW | (Brazil) | 10 | Jairo | 13 | 1 | 0 | 0 | 1 | 15 |
| 3 | DF | (Cape Verde) | 77 | João Correia | 7 | 0 | 0 | 0 | 3 | 10 |
| 3 | FW | (Sweden) | 22 | Muamer Tanković | 6 | 0 | 0 | 0 | 4 | 10 |
| 5 | MF | (Romania) | 30 | Vlad Dragomir | 5 | 1 | 0 | 1 | 2 | 9 |
| 7 | DF | (Spain) | 5 | David Goldar | 6 | 0 | 0 | 0 | 2 | 8 |
| 7 | FW | (Brazil) | 11 | Jajá | 4 | 0 | 0 | 0 | 4 | 8 |
| 8 | | | | Own goal | 1 | 0 | 0 | 1 | 3 | 5 |
| 9 | MF | (Bosnia and Herzegovina) | 26 | Ivan Šunjić | 4 | 0 | 0 | 0 | 0 | 4 |
| 9 | FW | (Croatia) | 17 | Mislav Oršić | 1 | 2 | 0 | 0 | 1 | 4 |
| 11 | MF | (Portugal) | 88 | Pêpê | 3 | 0 | 0 | 0 | 0 | 3 |
| 12 | MF | (Portugal) | 8 | Domingos Quina | 2 | 0 | 0 | 0 | 0 | 2 |
| 12 | MF | (Argentina) | 16 | Mateo Tanlongo | 1 | 1 | 0 | 0 | 0 | 2 |
| 12 | DF | (Netherlands) | 23 | Derrick Luckassen | 1 | 0 | 0 | 0 | 1 | 2 |
| 12 | FW | (Brazil) | 7 | Bruno Felipe | 1 | 0 | 0 | 0 | 1 | 2 |
| 16 | FW | (Brazil) | 9 | Léo Natel | 1 | 0 | 0 | 0 | 0 | 1 |
| 16 | MF | (Senegal) | 25 | Moustapha Name | 0 | 0 | 0 | 0 | 1 | 1 |
| 16 | DF | (Argentina) | 19 | Jonathan Silva | 0 | 0 | 0 | 0 | 1 | 1 |
| Total | | | | | 67 | 8 | 0 | 2 | 27 | 103 |

=== Clean sheets ===
| Place | Position | Nation | Number | Name | Cypriot First Division | Cypriot Cup | Super Cup | UEFA Europa League | UEFA Conference League | Total |
|---|---|---|---|---|---|---|---|---|---|---|
| 1 | GK | (Croatia) | 1 | Ivica Ivušić | 12 | 2 | 0 | 0 | 6 | 20 |
| 2 | GK | (Cyprus) | 93 | Neofytos Michail | 5 | 1 | 0 | 0 | 0 | 6 |
| 3 | GK | (Greece) | 99 | Athanasios Papadoudis | 1 | 0 | 0 | 0 | 0 | 1 |
| Total | | | | | 18 | 2 | 0 | 0 | 6 | 26 |

Ivica Ivušić & Neofytos Michail both played in Pafos' 2-0 victory over Apollon Limassol on 7 May 2025

=== Disciplinary record ===
| Number | Nation | Position | Name | Cypriot First Division | | Cypriot Cup | | Super Cup | | UEFA Europa League | | UEFA Conference League | | Total | |
| Number | Nation | Position | Name | Booked | Sent off (straight red) | Booked | Sent off (straight red) | Booked | Sent off (straight red) | Booked | Sent off (straight red) | Booked | Sent off (straight red) | Booked | Sent off (straight red) |
|---|---|---|---|---|---|---|---|---|---|---|---|---|---|---|---|
| 1 | (Croatia) | GK | Ivica Ivušić | 1 | 0 | 0 | 0 | 0 | 0 | 0 | 0 | 0 | 0 | 1 | 0 |
| 2 | (Cyprus) | DF | Kostas Pileas | 1 | 0 | 0 | 0 | 0 | 0 | 0 | 0 | 2 | 0 | 3 | 0 |
| 5 | (Spain) | DF | David Goldar | 5 | 0 | 1 | 0 | 0 | 0 | 0 | 0 | 3 | 0 | 9 | 0 |
| 7 | (Brazil) | FW | Bruno Felipe | 6 | 0 | 3 | 1 | 0 | 0 | 0 | 0 | 3 | 0 | 12 | 1 |
| 8 | (Portugal) | MF | Domingos Quina | 3 | 1 | 0 | 0 | 0 | 0 | 0 | 0 | 1 | 0 | 4 | 1 |
| 10 | (Brazil) | FW | Jairo | 3 | 0 | 0 | 0 | 0 | 0 | 1 | 0 | 1 | 0 | 5 | 0 |
| 11 | (Brazil) | FW | Jajá | 2 | 0 | 1 | 0 | 0 | 0 | 0 | 0 | 0 | 0 | 3 | 0 |
| 12 | (Sweden) | MF | Ken Sema | 1 | 0 | 0 | 0 | 0 | 0 | 0 | 0 | 1 | 0 | 2 | 0 |
| 16 | (Argentina) | MF | Mateo Tanlongo | 4 | 0 | 0 | 0 | 0 | 0 | 0 | 0 | 0 | 0 | 4 | 0 |
| 17 | (Croatia) | FW | Mislav Oršić | 1 | 0 | 0 | 0 | 0 | 0 | 0 | 0 | 0 | 0 | 1 | 0 |
| 19 | (Argentina) | DF | Jonathan Silva | 7 | 0 | 2 | 0 | 0 | 0 | 0 | 0 | 3 | 0 | 12 | 0 |
| 21 | (Croatia) | DF | Zvonimir Šarlija | 5 | 0 | 1 | 0 | 0 | 0 | 0 | 0 | 0 | 0 | 6 | 0 |
| 22 | (Sweden) | FW | Muamer Tanković | 6 | 0 | 1 | 0 | 1 | 0 | 0 | 0 | 4 | 0 | 12 | 0 |
| 23 | (Netherlands) | DF | Derrick Luckassen | 9 | 0 | 2 | 1 | 1 | 0 | 0 | 0 | 5 | 0 | 17 | 1 |
| 26 | (Bosnia and Herzegovina) | MF | Ivan Šunjić | 10 | 0 | 1 | 0 | 0 | 0 | 0 | 0 | 3 | 0 | 14 | 0 |
| 30 | (Romania) | MF | Vlad Dragomir | 6 | 0 | 1 | 0 | 0 | 1 | 0 | 0 | 1 | 0 | 8 | 1 |
| 32 | (Morocco) | DF | Mehdi Boukamir | 2 | 0 | 0 | 0 | 0 | 0 | 0 | 0 | 0 | 0 | 2 | 0 |
| 33 | (Brazil) | FW | Anderson Silva | 4 | 0 | 1 | 0 | 1 | 0 | 0 | 0 | 0 | 0 | 6 | 0 |
| 77 | (Cape Verde) | DF | João Correia | 6 | 0 | 1 | 0 | 0 | 0 | 0 | 1 | 4 | 0 | 11 | 1 |
| 84 | (Portugal) | FW | Kevin Nhaga | 1 | 0 | 0 | 0 | 0 | 0 | 0 | 0 | 0 | 0 | 1 | 0 |
| 88 | (Portugal) | MF | Pêpê | 3 | 0 | 1 | 0 | 0 | 0 | 0 | 0 | 3 | 0 | 7 | 0 |
Players away on loan:
| 6 | (Portugal) | MF | Pedro Pelágio | 0 | 0 | 0 | 0 | 0 | 0 | 0 | 0 | 1 | 0 | 1 | 0 |
| 25 | (Senegal) | MF | Moustapha Name | 2 | 0 | 0 | 0 | 0 | 0 | 1 | 0 | 2 | 0 | 5 | 0 |
Players who left Pafos during the season:
| 3 | (Argentina) | DF | Matías Melluso | 0 | 0 | 0 | 0 | 0 | 0 | 2 | 1 | 0 | 0 | 2 | 1 |
| 9 | (Brazil) | FW | Léo Natel | 2 | 0 | 0 | 0 | 0 | 0 | 0 | 0 | 0 | 0 | 2 | 0 |
| 34 | (Brazil) | MF | Diogo Dall'Igna | 0 | 0 | 0 | 0 | 0 | 0 | 0 | 0 | 1 | 0 | 1 | 0 |
| 45 | (Brazil) | DF | Rafael Pontelo | 2 | 1 | 0 | 0 | 0 | 0 | 0 | 0 | 0 | 0 | 2 | 1 |
| Total | | | | 92 | 2 | 16 | 2 | 3 | 1 | 4 | 2 | 37 | 0 | 152 | 7 |
