= Mehdi Boukamir =

Moroccan footballer (born 2004)

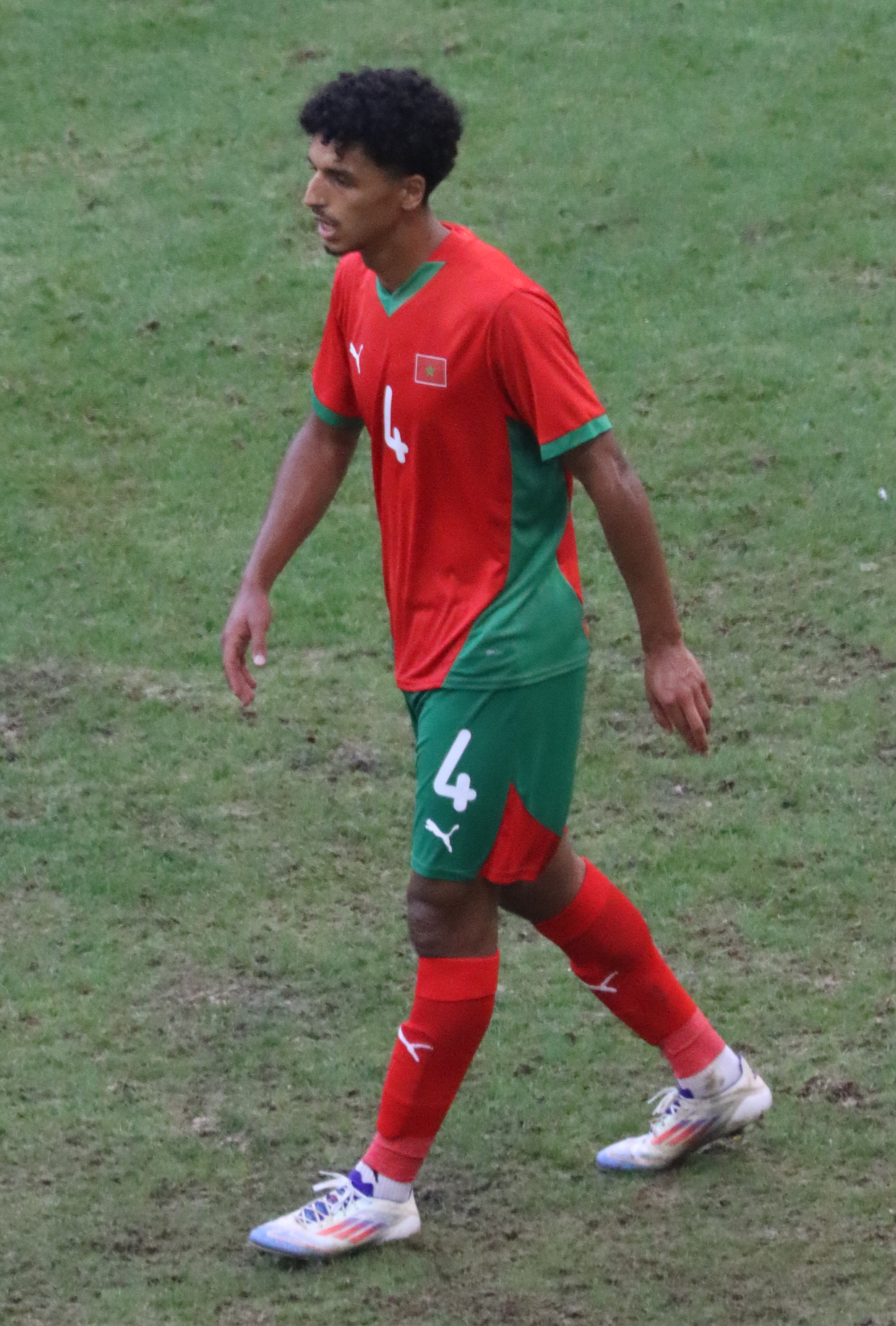

Personal information
- Date of birth: 26 January 2004 (age 22)
- Place of birth: Jemeppe-sur-Sambre, Belgium
- Height: 1.88 m (6 ft 2 in)
- Position: Centre-back

Team information
- Current team: RAAL La Louvière (on loan from Charleroi)
- Number: 44

Youth career
- 2010–2013: Espoir Jemeppe
- 2013–2022: Charleroi

Senior career*
Years	Team	Apps	(Gls)
2022	Zébra Élites	13	(0)
2022–	Charleroi	36	(0)
2024–2025	→ Pafos (loan)	15	(0)
2026–	→ RAAL La Louvière (loan)	0	(0)

International career^{‡}
2021–2022	Belgium U18	9	(0)
2022	Belgium U19	1	(0)
2023	Morocco U23	4	(0)
Medal record
Representing Morocco
U-23 Africa Cup of Nations
Winner	2023 Morocco
Olympic Games
Bronze medal – third place	2024 Paris	Team
- * Club domestic league appearances and goals as of 16 August 2026 ‡ National team caps and goals as of 20:57, 26 May 2023 (UTC)

Mehdi Boukamir (Arabic: مهدي بوكامير; born 26 January 2004) is a professional footballer who plays as a centre-back for Belgian Pro League club RAAL La Louvière on loan from Charleroi. Born in Belgium, he represents Morocco at youth international level.

== Career ==
A youth product of Espoir Jemeppe and Charleroi, Boukamir signed his first professional contract with Charleroi on 6 February 2021. He started training with Charleroi reserves in the beginning of the 2022–23 season before promoting to their senior team. He made his senior and professional debut with Charleroi in a 4–1 Belgian First Division A loss to Cercle Brugge on 21 October 2022. On 13 February 2023, he extended his professional contract with Charleroi until 2025.

On 9 September 2024, Boukamir was loaned to Pafos in Cyprus.

In the summer of 2026, Boukamir moved on loan to RAAL La Louvière with an option to buy.

== International career ==
Born in Belgium, Boukamir's parents are both Moroccan. He was called up to a training camp for the Morocco U17s in October 2020. He has since represented Belgium up to the U19s.

In June 2023, he was included in the final squad of the under-23 national team for the 2023 U-23 Africa Cup of Nations, hosted by Morocco itself, where the Atlas Lions won their first title and qualified for the 2024 Summer Olympics.

== Career statistics ==
As of match played 26 June 2025

Club	Season	League			Cup		Continental		Other		Total	
Club	Season	Division	Apps	Goals	Apps	Goals	Apps	Goals	Apps	Goals	Apps	Goals
Charleroi	2022–23	Belgian Pro League	10	0	0	0	—		—		10	0
Charleroi	2023–24	Belgian Pro League	11	0	2	0	—		—		13	0
Charleroi	Total		21	0	2	0	0	0	0	0	23	0
Pafos (loan)	2024–25	Cypriot First Division	15	0	2	0	0	0	—		17	0
Career total			36	0	4	0	0	0	0	0	40	0

== Honours ==
Pafos

- Cypriot First Division: 2024–25

Morocco U23

- U-23 Africa Cup of Nations: 2023
- Summer Olympics Bronze Medal: 2024
