= Jonathan Silva (footballer) =

Argentine footballer (born 1994)

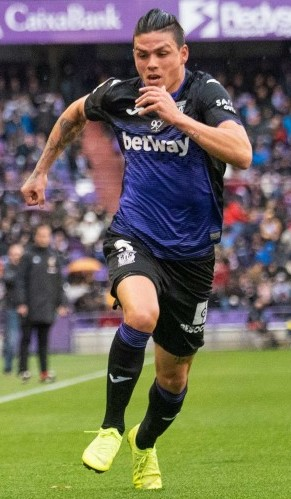
- Silva with Leganés in 2018

Personal information
- Full name: Jonathan Cristian Silva
- Date of birth: 29 June 1994 (age 32)
- Place of birth: La Plata, Argentina
- Height: 1.78 m (5 ft 10 in)
- Position: Left-back

Team information
- Current team: Johor Darul Ta'zim
- Number: 33

Youth career
- Estudiantes

Senior career*
Years	Team	Apps	(Gls)
2011–2014	Estudiantes	54	(1)
2014–2015	Sporting CP B	6	(1)
2014–2019	Sporting CP	21	(1)
2016–2017	→ Boca Juniors (loan)	28	(2)
2018	→ Roma (loan)	2	(0)
2018–2019	→ Leganés (loan)	30	(3)
2019–2021	Leganés	50	(1)
2021–2025	Getafe	9	(0)
2022–2023	→ Granada (loan)	12	(0)
2023–2024	→ Albacete (loan)	29	(3)
2024–2025	→ Pafos	25	(0)
2025–	Johor Darul Ta'zim	1	(0)

International career^{‡}
2014	Argentina	2	(0)
- * Club domestic league appearances and goals as of 03:14, 14 September 2025 (UTC) ‡ National team caps and goals as of 13 November 2014

Jonathan Cristian Silva (born 29 June 1994) is an Argentine professional footballer who plays as a left-back for Malaysia Super League club Johor Darul Ta'zim.

== Club career ==
Silva is a youth exponent from Estudiantes. He made his debut for Estudiantes during the 2011–12 season.

On 9 August 2014, Silva joined Portuguese side, Sporting CP, for a €2.6 million transfer fee.

In 2016, he returned to his home country to play for Boca Juniors on loan.

On 31 January 2018, Silva moved to Serie A outfit A.S. Roma. He initially joined the club on a six-month loan contract, which included a buy obligation clause at the end of its term for a €5.7 million fee.

On 24 July 2018, Silva moved to La Liga side CD Leganés on a season loan, which includes a buy obligation clause at the end of the year for €3 million, replacing Bournemouth-bound Diego Rico and wearing the number 5 jersey. He signed permanently in July 2019, but suffered relegation at the end of the campaign.

On 31 August 2021, Silva signed a four-year contract with Getafe CF in the top tier. On 26 July of the following year, he was loaned to Granada CF in Segunda División for one year.

On 10 August 2023, Silva moved to fellow second division side Albacete on loan for the 2023–24 season.

On 31 August 2024, Pafos announced the signing of Silva from Getafe on loan.

On 6 July 2025, Silva moved to Southeast Asia to joined Malaysia Super League club Johor Darul Ta'zim.

== International career ==
Silva was called up to the Argentina national team in November 2014 where he make his debut against Croatia on 12 November and his second appearance against Portugal on 18 November.

== Career statistics ==
As of match played 26 June 2025

Appearances and goals by club, season and competition
Club	Season	League			Cup		League Cup		Continental		Other		Total	
Club	Season	Division	Apps	Goals	Apps	Goals	Apps	Goals	Apps	Goals	Apps	Goals	Apps	Goals
Estudiantes	2012–13	Argentine Primera División	3	0	0	0	—		—		—		3	0
Estudiantes	2013–14	Argentine Primera División	16	0	3	0	—		—		—		19	0
Estudiantes	2014	Argentine Primera División	35	0	1	0	—		—		—		36	0
Estudiantes	Total		54	0	4	0	—		—		—		58	0
Sporting CP	2014–15	Primeira Liga	11	1	4	0	1	0	4	1	—		20	2
Sporting CP	2015–16	Primeira Liga	4	0	1	0	0	0	5	0	0	0	10	0
Sporting CP	2017–18	Primeira Liga	6	0	2	0	1	0	4	0	—		13	0
Sporting CP	Total		21	1	7	0	2	0	13	0	0	0	43	1
Boca Juniors (loan)	2016	Argentine Primera División	15	1	2	0	0	0	5	0	1	0	23	1
Boca Juniors (loan)	2016–17	Argentine Primera División	13	1	0	0	0	0	0	0	0	0	13	1
Boca Juniors (loan)	Total		28	2	2	0	0	0	5	0	1	0	36	2
Roma (loan)	2017–18	Serie A	2	0	0	0	—		—		—		2	0
Leganés (loan)	2018–19	La Liga	30	3	3	0	—		—		—		33	3
Leganés	2019–20	La Liga	33	1	3	1	—		—		—		36	2
Leganés	2020–21	Segunda División	17	0	0	0	—		—		—		17	0
Leganés	2021–22	Segunda División	2	0	0	0	—		—		—		2	0
Leganés	Total		52	1	3	1	—		—		—		55	2
Getafe	2021–22	La Liga	9	0	2	0	—		—		—		11	0
Granada (loan)	2022–23	Segunda División	12	0	2	0	—		—		—		14	0
Albacete (loan)	2023–24	Segunda División	29	3	0	0	—		—		—		29	3
Pafos (loan)	2024–25	Cypriot First Division	25	0	4	0	—		7	1	—		36	1
Career total			262	6	27	1	2	0	25	1	1	0	317	13

== Honours ==
=== Sporting CP ===
- Taça de Portugal: 2014–15
- Supertaça Cândido de Oliveira: 2015

=== Granada ===
- Segunda División: 2022–23

=== Pafos ===
- Cypriot First Division: 2024–25

=== Johor Darul Ta'zim ===
- Malaysia Charity Shield: 2025
