= David Goldar =

Spanish footballer (born 1994)

Personal information
- Full name: David Goldar Gómez
- Date of birth: 15 September 1994 (age 32)
- Place of birth: Portas, Spain
- Height: 1.84 m (6 ft 0 in)
- Position: Centre-back

Team information
- Current team: Pafos
- Number: 5

Youth career
- Vilagarcía SD
- AJ Lérez
- 2004–2013: Celta

Senior career*
| Years | Team | Apps | (Gls) |
| 2013–2016 | Celta B | 74 | (5) |
| 2014–2016 | Celta | 2 | (0) |
| 2016–2017 | Ponferradina | 11 | (0) |
| 2017–2018 | Pontevedra | 32 | (1) |
| 2018–2019 | Cornellà | 34 | (4) |
| 2019–2020 | Gimnàstic | 23 | (2) |
| 2020–2023 | Ibiza | 72 | (11) |
| 2023 | Burgos | 17 | (0) |
| 2023– | Pafos | 73 | (9) |
- * Club domestic league appearances and goals as of 22:00, 18 September 2026 (UTC)

David Goldar Gómez (born 15 September 1994) is a Spanish professional footballer who plays as a central defender for Cypriot club Pafos.

== Club career ==
Born in Portas, Galicia, Goldar played youth football with local RC Celta de Vigo. He started his senior career in 2013 with the B team in the Segunda División B, being initially deployed as a defensive midfielder.

Goldar made his La Liga debut on 3 May 2014, coming on as a 76th-minute substitute for Andreu Fontàs in a 2–0 away win against CA Osasuna. In June 2016 he was released from his contract, and on 14 September he signed for third-division club SD Ponferradina.

Goldar continued in division three in the 2017–18 season, with Pontevedra CF. On 9 July 2018, he joined UE Cornellà of the same league, being a regular starter during the campaign and scoring four goals.

On 2 July 2019, Goldar agreed to a two-year contract with Gimnàstic de Tarragona, recently relegated to the third tier. In the summer of 2020, he moved to UD Ibiza. He helped the latter side to reach the Segunda División for the first time ever in his first year, contributing four goals to this feat.

In 2021–22, which was also his first season at that level, Goldar helped Ibiza to stay up with seven goals from 36 games which were the best figures for a defender in nine years; most were headed in from corner kicks. On 26 January 2023, however, he terminated his contract with the club, and joined Burgos CF later that day.

On 22 August 2023, Burgos announced the transfer of Goldar to Pafos FC from Cyprus. He helped them to win the first title of their ten-year history, the 2023–24 Cypriot Cup, adding the following season's national championship to reach the league phase of the UEFA Champions League.

== Personal life ==
In June 2021, Goldar was called as a witness for the trial of his former Celta teammate Santi Mina, who was accused of sexual assault on their holiday in Mojácar four years earlier. The following March, he was tried as the latter's alleged accomplice, being acquitted as Mina was sent to prison for four years.

== Career statistics ==
As of match played 18 September 2026

Appearances and goals by club, season and competition
| Club | Season | League | | | Cup (Note: Includes Copa del Rey, Cypriot Cup) | | Continental | | Other | | Total | |
| Club | Season | Division | Apps | Goals | Apps | Goals | Apps | Goals | Apps | Goals | Apps | Goals |
|---|---|---|---|---|---|---|---|---|---|---|---|---|
| Celta B | 2013–14 | Segunda División B | 26 | 1 | — | | — | | — | | 26 | 1 |
| Celta B | 2014–15 | Segunda División B | 23 | 2 | — | | — | | — | | 23 | 2 |
| Celta B | 2015–16 | Segunda División B | 25 | 2 | — | | — | | — | | 25 | 2 |
| Celta B | Total | | 74 | 5 | — | | — | | — | | 74 | 5 |
| Celta | 2013–14 | La Liga | 1 | 0 | 0 | 0 | — | | — | | 1 | 0 |
| Celta | 2015–16 | La Liga | 1 | 0 | 0 | 0 | — | | — | | 1 | 0 |
| Celta | Total | | 2 | 0 | 0 | 0 | — | | — | | 2 | 0 |
| Ponferradina | 2016–17 | Segunda División B | 11 | 0 | 0 | 0 | — | | — | | 11 | 0 |
| Pontevedra | 2017–18 | Segunda División B | 32 | 1 | 1 | 0 | — | | — | | 33 | 1 |
| Cornellà | 2018–19 | Segunda División B | 34 | 4 | 1 | 0 | — | | 2 (Note: Appearances in Segunda División B play-offs) | 0 | 37 | 4 |
| Gimnàstic | 2019–20 | Segunda División B | 23 | 2 | 2 | 0 | — | | — | | 25 | 2 |
| Ibiza | 2020–21 | Segunda División B | 23 | 4 | 3 | 0 | — | | 2 | 0 | 28 | 4 |
| Ibiza | 2021–22 | Segunda División | 36 | 7 | 2 | 0 | — | | — | | 38 | 7 |
| Ibiza | 2022–23 | Segunda División | 13 | 0 | 2 | 0 | — | | — | | 15 | 0 |
| Ibiza | Total | | 74 | 11 | 7 | 0 | — | | — | | 81 | 11 |
| Burgos | 2022–23 | Segunda División | 16 | 0 | 0 | 0 | — | | — | | 16 | 0 |
| Burgos | 2023–24 | Segunda División | 1 | 0 | 0 | 0 | — | | — | | 1 | 0 |
| Burgos | Total | | 17 | 0 | 0 | 0 | — | | — | | 17 | 0 |
| Pafos | 2023–24 | Cypriot First Division | 29 | 3 | 4 | 1 | — | | — | | 33 | 4 |
| Pafos | 2024–25 | Cypriot First Division | 29 | 6 | 4 | 0 | 17 (Note: Fifteen appearances and two goals in UEFA Conference League, two appearances in UEFA Europa League) | 2 | 1 (Note: Appearance in Cypriot Super Cup) | 0 | 51 | 8 |
| Pafos | 2025–26 | Cypriot First Division | 13 | 0 | 1 | 0 | 12 (Note: Appearances in UEFA Champions League) | 0 | 1 | 0 | 27 | 0 |
| Pafos | 2026–27 | Cypriot First Division | 2 | 0 | 0 | 0 | 6 (Note: Four appearances and one goal in UEFA Europa League, two appearances in UEFA Conference League) | 1 | — | | 8 | 1 |
| Pafos | Total | | 73 | 9 | 9 | 1 | 35 | 3 | 2 | 0 | 119 | 13 |
| Career total | | | 338 | 32 | 20 | 1 | 35 | 3 | 6 | 0 | 395 | 36 |

== Honours ==
Pafos

- Cypriot First Division: 2024–25
- Cypriot Cup: 2023–24, 2025–26
- Cypriot Super Cup: 2026
