= Kostas Pileas =

Cypriot footballer (born 1998)

Personal information
- Date of birth: 11 December 1998 (age 27)
- Place of birth: Paphos, Cyprus
- Height: 1.80 m (5 ft 11 in)
- Position: Left-back

Team information
- Current team: AEK Larnaca
- Number: 17

Youth career
- 2014–2017: Arsenal

Senior career*
Years	Team	Apps	(Gls)
2017–2021	Anorthosis	12	(0)
2018–2019	→ Ermis Aradippou (loan)	16	(0)
2021–2022	Ethnikos Achna	25	(0)
2022–2023	Aris Limassol	20	(0)
2023–2024	Panserraikos	21	(2)
2024–2026	Pafos	34	(1)
2026–	AEK Larnaca	0	(0)

International career^{‡}
2014–2016	Cyprus U17	2	(1)
2016–2017	Cyprus U19	7	(0)
2017–2020	Cyprus U21	11	(0)
2023–	Cyprus	19	(1)
- * Club domestic league appearances and goals as of 16:05, 4 June 2026 (UTC) ‡ National team caps and goals as of 12:00, 4 October 2026 (UTC)

Kostas Pileas (Greek: Κώστας Πηλέας; born 11 December 1998) is a Cypriot professional footballer who plays as a left-back for AEK Larnaca and the Cyprus national team.

== Club career ==
Having come through Arsenal's academy, Pileas returned to Cyprus in 2017, joining Anorthosis Famagusta. He spent the 2018–19 season on loan at Ermis Aradippou. He then returned to Anorthosis, with whom he would win the 2020–21 Cypriot Cup.

The following summer, he moved to Ethnikos Achna, and helped the team reach the final of the Cypriot Cup for the second time ever. He played the full 120 minutes in the final, even hitting the post in extra time, however Ethnikos went on to lose on penalties.

In June 2022, Pileas joined Aris Limassol. He went on to win the 2022–23 Cypriot First Division with Aris.

== International career ==
Pileas made his debut for the Cyprus national team on 20 June 2023, in a 3–1 defeat to Norway in the Euro 2024 qualifiers.

== Career statistics ==
=== Club ===
As of 14 April 2026

Club	Season	League			Cup		Continental		Other		Total	
Club	Season	Division	Apps	Goals	Apps	Goals	Apps	Goals	Apps	Goals	Apps	Goals
Anorthosis	2017–18	Cypriot First Division	5	0	2	0	—		—		7	0
Anorthosis	2019–20	Cypriot First Division	0	0	0	0	—		—		0	0
Anorthosis	2020–21	Cypriot First Division	7	0	2	0	—		—		9	0
Anorthosis	Total		12	0	4	0	—		—		16	0
Ermis Aradippou (loan)	2018–19	Cypriot First Division	16	0	3	0	—		—		19	0
Ethnikos Achna	2021–22	Cypriot First Division	25	0	6	0	—		—		31	0
Aris Limassol	2022–23	Cypriot First Division	20	0	1	0	1	0	—		22	0
Panserraikos	2023–24	Superleague Greece	21	2	3	0	—		—		24	2
Pafos	2024–25	Cypriot First Division	15	0	3	0	13	0	1	0	31	0
Pafos	2025–26	Cypriot First Division	19	1	1	0	13	0	1	0	34	1
Pafos	Total		34	1	4	0	26	0	2	0	65	1
Career total			128	3	21	0	27	0	2	0	177	3

=== International ===
As of match played 2 October 2026

Appearances and goals by national team and year
National team	Year	Apps	Goals
Cyprus	2023	5	1
Cyprus	2024	4	0
Cyprus	2025	6	0
Cyprus	2026	4	0
Total		19	1

==== International goals ====
No.	Date	Venue	Opponent	Score	Result	Competition
1.	16 November 2023	Alphamega Stadium, Limassol, Cyprus	Spain	1–3	1–3	UEFA Euro 2024 qualifying

== Honours ==
Aris Limassol

- Cypriot First Division: 2022–23

Pafos

- Cypriot First Division: 2024–25
- Cypriot Cup: 2025–26
