= Bruno Felipe (footballer) =

Brazilian footballer (born 1994)

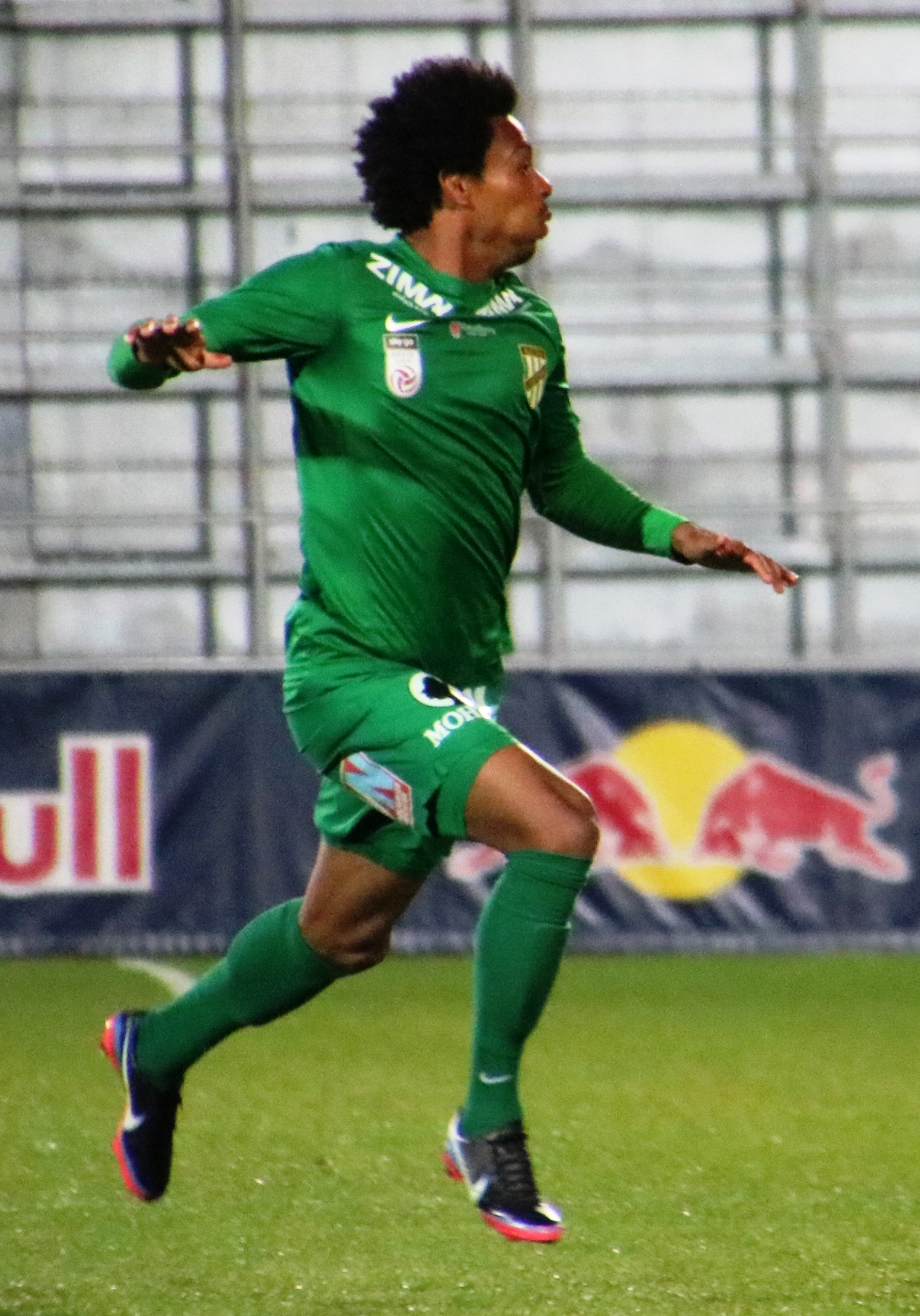

Personal information
- Full name: Bruno Felipe Souza da Silva
- Date of birth: 26 May 1994 (age 32)
- Place of birth: São Paulo, Brazil
- Height: 1.80 m (5 ft 11 in)
- Positions: Right back; winger

Team information
- Current team: Pafos
- Number: 7

Senior career*
Years	Team	Apps	(Gls)
2015–2017	Austria Lustenau II	15	(11)
2015–2017	Austria Lustenau	58	(13)
2017–2019	LASK	18	(1)
2018–2019	→ Atromitos (loan)	38	(3)
2019–2021	Olympiacos	10	(0)
2021	Aris	12	(0)
2021–2022	Sheriff Tiraspol	16	(5)
2022–2023	Omonia	20	(8)
2023–	Pafos	108	(10)
- * Club domestic league appearances and goals as of 11 October 2026

Bruno Felipe Souza da Silva (born 26 May 1994), known as Bruno Felipe or just Bruno, is a Brazilian professional footballer who plays as a right back or winger for Cypriot First Division club Pafos.

== Club career ==
=== Atromitos ===
On 24 January 2018, Atromitos announced the signing of the Brazilian winger from LASK Linz on an 18-month deal.

=== Olympiacos ===
On 18 June 2019, Olympiacos announced the signing of Bruno Felipe for an estimated transfer fee of €500,000 on a three-year contract.

=== Aris ===
On 1 February 2021, he signed a two-and-a-half-year contract with Aris. On 20 August 2021, he joined Moldovan National Division club Sheriff Tiraspol.

=== Omonoia ===
On 4 June 2022, he signed a two-year contract with Omonia.

=== Pafos ===
On 31 January 2023, Pafos announced the signing of Bruno from AC Omonia for an undisclosed fee. On 12 February 2025, Pafos announced that they had extended their contract with Bruno until the summer of 2027.

== Career statistics ==
As of match played 15 October 2026

Club	Season	League			National Cup		Continental		Other		Total	
Club	Season	Division	Apps	Goals	Apps	Goals	Apps	Goals	Apps	Goals	Apps	Goals
SC Austria Lustenau	2015–16	Erste Liga	27	3	1	0	—		—		28	3
SC Austria Lustenau	2016–17	Erste Liga	31	10	1	0	—		—		32	10
SC Austria Lustenau	Total		58	13	2	0	—		—		60	13
LASK	2017–18	Austrian Bundesliga	18	1	3	0	—		—		21	1
Atromitos (loan)	2017–18	Super League Greece	11	1	1	0	—		—		12	1
Atromitos (loan)	2018–19	Super League Greece	27	2	5	1	1	0	—		33	3
Atromitos (loan)	Total		38	3	6	1	1	0	—		45	4
Olympiacos	2019–20	Super League Greece	7	0	1	0	1	0	—		9	0
Olympiacos	2020–21	Super League Greece	3	0	0	0	0	0	—		3	0
Olympiacos	Total		10	0	1	0	1	0	—		12	0
Aris Thessaloniki	2020–21	Super League Greece	12	0	2	0	—		—		14	0
Aris Thessaloniki	2021–22	Super League Greece	—		—		2	0	—		2	0
Aris Thessaloniki	Total		12	0	2	0	2	0	—		16	0
Sheriff Tiraspol	2021–22	Divizia Naţională	18	5	3	1	8	0	—		29	6
Omonia	2022–23	Cypriot First Division	20	8	1	1	8	1	1	0	30	10
Pafos	2022–23	Cypriot First Division	15	1	2	0	—		—		17	1
Pafos	2023–24	Cypriot First Division	28	3	3	0	—		—		31	3
Pafos	2024–25	Cypriot First Division	33	1	4	0	18	1	1	0	56	2
Pafos	2025–26	Cypriot First Division	28	5	3	0	13	1	1	0	45	6
Pafos	2026–27	Cypriot First Division	4	0	0	0	6	0	1	0	11	0
Pafos	Total		108	10	12	0	37	2	3	0	160	12
Career total			280	34	30	3	57	3	4	0	419	46

== Honours ==
Olympiacos

- Super League Greece: 2019–20
- Greek Cup: 2019–20

Pafos

- Cypriot First Division: 2024–25
- Cypriot Cup: 2023–24, 2025–26
- Cypriot Super Cup: 2026
