= Léo Natel =

Brazilian footballer

Personal information
- Full name: Leonardo Natel Vieira
- Date of birth: 14 March 1997 (age 29)
- Place of birth: Porto Alegre, Brazil
- Height: 1.79 m (5 ft 10 in)
- Position: Winger

Team information
- Current team: Ordabasy
- Number: 19

Youth career
- 2015–2016: Benfica
- 2016–2017: → São Paulo (loan)

Senior career*
| Years | Team | Apps | (Gls) |
| 2017–2020 | São Paulo | 1 | (0) |
| 2018 | → Fortaleza (loan) | 13 | (2) |
| 2018–2019 | → APOEL (loan) | 26 | (8) |
| 2020–2024 | Corinthians | 46 | (4) |
| 2021–2022 | → APOEL (loan) | 24 | (4) |
| 2022–2023 | → Casa Pia (loan) | 4 | (0) |
| 2023–2024 | → Melbourne City (loan) | 25 | (6) |
| 2024–2025 | Pafos | 13 | (1) |
| 2025 | Novorizontino | 11 | (0) |
| 2025–2026 | AEL Limassol | 24 | (5) |
| 2026– | Ordabasy | 24 | (5) |
- * Club domestic league appearances and goals as of 14:15, 31 October 2026 (UTC)

Leonardo Natel Vieira (born 14 March 1997), mainly known as Léo Natel, is a Brazilian professional footballer who plays as a winger for Kazakhstan Premier League club Ordabasy.

== Career ==
=== São Paulo ===
Born in Porto Alegre, Rio Grande do Sul, Natel started his youth career with the academy of Portuguese club Benfica. In July 2016, he was loaned out to São Paulo back in his home country, being initially assigned to the under-20 squad. He won the Copa do Brasil Sub-20 and the Campeonato Brasileiro Sub-20 with the category in that season, being named the best player of the latter competition.

On 14 March 2017, Natel was called to the senior team by head coach Rogério Ceni for a Copa do Brasil match against ABC. On 27 May, he signed permanently with Tricolor for a fee of €135,000.

Natel made his first team – and Série A – debut on 4 June 2017, coming on as a late substitute for Marcinho in a 1–0 defeat against Ponte Preta.

==== Fortaleza (loan) ====
On 9 December 2017, Natel was loaned out to Fortaleza for one year. He made his club debut on 17 January 2018, starting in a 4–0 Campeonato Cearense away routing of Uniclinic.

Natel scored his first senior goal on 25 January 2018, netting Leão's third in a 3–1 home win over Iguatu. On 2 May, despite being regularly used in the 2018 Cearense, his contract with Fortaleza was terminated.

==== APOEL (loan) ====
On 14 June 2018, Natel moved abroad and was presented at Cypriot club APOEL on a season-long loan deal. He scored 10 league goals during the campaign, as the club won the Cypriot First Division.

=== Corinthians ===
In January 2020, after failing to appear for São Paulo after returning from loan, Natel agreed to a pre-contract with Corinthians, effective as of 1 July. He was presented by his new club on 16 July, and made his debut for the club on 2 August, replacing Mateus Vital late into a 1–0 Campeonato Paulista home win over Mirassol.

Natel scored his first goal for Timão on 19 August 2020, netting the opener in a 3–1 home win over Coritiba. He featured regularly during the remainder of the year, scoring a further three goals.

==== APOEL return (loan) ====
On 31 August 2021, Natel returned to APOEL also on a one-year loan deal. He was also a first-choice in his second spell, scoring six times and providing five assists, but was sent back to his parent club on 3 June 2022, after the club opted to not exercise his buyout clause.

==== Casa Pia (loan) ====
Back to Corinthians, Natel was again included in the first team squad of the club in August 2022, but was loaned to Portuguese Primeira Liga side Casa Pia late in the month. In November, however, he suffered an ankle injury, which led him to miss the remainder of the season.

Natel officially returned from loan on 1 July 2023, after making just four matches.

==== Melbourne City (loan) ====
On 12 September 2023, Natel was loaned to Melbourne City until June 2024. Despite being regularly used and scoring six goals, he returned from loan in June 2024, after his buyout clause was not exercised.

=== Pafos ===
On 20 July 2024, Pafos announced the signing of Natel from Corinthians. On 23 January 2025, Pafos announced that Natel had left the club after his contract was ended by mutual agreement.

== Career statistics ==
As of 21 October 2024

Appearances and goals by club, season and competition
| Club | Season | League | | | State league (Note: Includes Campeonato Cearense, Campeonato Paulista) | | National cup (Note: Includes Copa do Brasil, Cypriot Cup) | | Continental | | Other | | Total | |
| Club | Season | Division | Apps | Goals | Apps | Goals | Apps | Goals | Apps | Goals | Apps | Goals | Apps | Goals |
|---|---|---|---|---|---|---|---|---|---|---|---|---|---|---|
| São Paulo | 2016 | Série A | 0 | 0 | — | | — | | — | | 7 (Note: Appearance(s) in Copa Paulista) | 0 | 7 | 0 |
| São Paulo | 2017 | Série A | 1 | 0 | 0 | 0 | 0 | 0 | — | | 1 | 0 | 2 | 0 |
| São Paulo | Total | | 1 | 0 | 0 | 0 | — | | — | | 8 | 0 | 9 | 0 |
| Fortaleza (loan) | 2018 | Série B | 1 | 0 | 12 | 2 | 0 | 0 | — | | 0 | 0 | 13 | 2 |
| APOEL (loan) | 2018–19 | Cypriot First Division | 26 | 8 | — | | 4 | 2 | 2 (Note: Appearance(s) in UEFA Champions League) | 0 | 0 | 0 | 32 | 10 |
| Corinthians | 2020 | Série A | 31 | 4 | 2 | 0 | 2 | 0 | — | | — | | 35 | 4 |
| Corinthians | 2021 | Série A | 3 | 0 | 9 | 0 | 3 | 0 | 4 (Note: Appearance(s) in Copa Sudamericana) | 0 | — | | 19 | 0 |
| Corinthians | 2022 | Série A | 1 | 0 | — | | 0 | 0 | — | | — | | 1 | 0 |
| Corinthians | Total | | 35 | 4 | 11 | 0 | 5 | 0 | 4 | 0 | — | | 55 | 4 |
| APOEL (loan) | 2021–22 | Cypriot First Division | 24 | 4 | — | | 5 | 2 | — | | — | | 29 | 6 |
| Casa Pia (loan) | 2022–23 | Primeira Liga | 4 | 0 | — | | 0 | 0 | — | | 0 | 0 | 4 | 0 |
| Melbourne City (loan) | 2023–24 | A-League Men | 24 | 6 | — | | 0 | 0 | 4 (Note: Appearance(s) in AFC Champions League) | 0 | 1 (Note: Appearance(s) in A-League Men finals series) | 0 | 29 | 6 |
| Pafos | 2024–25 | Cypriot First Division | 7 | 0 | — | | 0 | 0 | 3 (Note: Appearances in UEFA Conference League) | 0 | 1 (Note: Appearance in Cypriot Super Cup) | 0 | 11 | 0 |
| Career total | | | 122 | 22 | 23 | 2 | 14 | 4 | 13 | 0 | 10 | 0 | 182 | 28 |

== Honours ==
Ordabasy

- Kazakhstan Premier League: 2026
- Kazakhstan Cup: 2026
