= Rafael Pontelo =

Brazilian footballer (born 2003)

Personal information
- Full name: Rafael da Silva Pontelo
- Date of birth: 22 January 2003 (age 23)
- Place of birth: Sete Lagoas, Brazil
- Height: 1.91 m (6 ft 3 in)
- Position: Centre-back

Team information
- Current team: Farense (on loan from Sporting CP B)
- Number: 45

Youth career
- América Mineiro
- Bela Vista
- 2019–2023: Ponte Preta
- 2022: → Real Valladolid (loan)
- 2022–2023: → Cruzeiro (loan)

Senior career*
Years	Team	Apps	(Gls)
2023–2024	Leixões	12	(0)
2024–	Sporting CP	1	(0)
2024–	Sporting CP B	4	(0)
2024–2025	→ Pafos (loan)	4	(0)
2025	→ Auda (loan)	15	(0)
2026–	→ Farense (loan)	7	(0)
- * Club domestic league appearances and goals as of 20 May 2026

Rafael da Silva Pontelo (born 22 January 2003) is a Brazilian professional footballer who plays as a centre-back for Liga Portugal 2 club Farense, on loan from Sporting CP B.

== Club career ==
Pontelo was born in Matozinhos and raised in Sete Lagoas. He is a youth product of América Mineiro, Bela Vista, and Ponte Preta. From Ponte Preta he moved on loan to the Spanish club Real Valladolid in 2022, and then Cruzeiro until 2023. On 11 July 2023, he transferred to Leixões in the Liga Portugal 2 on a three-year contract where he began his senior career.

On 2 January 2024, he transferred to Sporting CP in the Primeira Liga on a contract until 2028. He made his debut with Sporting CP as a starter in a 4–0 Taça de Portugal win over Tondela on 9 January 2024.

== Personal life ==
Born in Brazil, Pontelo is of Italian descent and holds dual citizenship. Turned down at Atlético Mineiro because of his slight build, as a child and teenager he escaped street life, crime and violence with the help of Ponte Preta.

== Career statistics ==
=== Club ===
As of match played 22 December 2024

Club	Season	League			National cup		League cup		Continental		Other		Total	
Club	Season	Division	Apps	Goals	Apps	Goals	Apps	Goals	Apps	Goals	Apps	Goals	Apps	Goals
Leixões	2023–24	Liga Portugal 2	12	0	1	0	1	0	—		—		14	0
Sporting CP	2023–24	Primeira Liga	1	0	1	0	0	0	0	0	—		2	0
Pafos (loan)	2024–25	Cypriot First Division	4	0	0	0	—		3	0	1	0	8	0
Career total			17	0	2	0	1	0	3	0	1	0	24	0

== Honours ==
Sporting CP

- Primeira Liga: 2023–24
