= Anderson Silva (footballer) =

Brazilian footballer (born 1997)

Personal information
- Full name: Anderson Oliveira Silva
- Date of birth: 21 November 1997 (age 29)
- Place of birth: São Paulo, Brazil
- Height: 1.86 m (6 ft 1 in)
- Position: Forward

Team information
- Current team: Pafos
- Number: 33

Senior career*
Years	Team	Apps	(Gls)
2016–2017	Guaratinguetá	16	(4)
2017	Guarani	0	(0)
2017–2021	Famalicão	105	(25)
2021	Beijing Guoan	8	(2)
2022–2023	Vitória de Guimarães	30	(4)
2023–2025	Alanyaspor	11	(0)
2024–2025	→ Pafos (loan)	36	(12)
2025–	Pafos	42	(12)
- * Club domestic league appearances and goals as of 18:32, 22 November 2026 (UTC)

Anderson Oliveira Silva (born 21 November 1997), also known as just Anderson, is a Brazilian professional footballer who plays as a forward for Pafos.

== Professional career ==
On 19 July 2017, Anderson signed with Famalicão. Anderson made his professional debut with Famalicão in a 1-0 LigaPro win over U.D. Oliveirense on 27 August 2017. Anderson scored 9 goals in 30 games as Famalicao finished in second in the LigaPro in 2019, earning promotion to the top flight for their first appearance in 25 years. Anderson began the following season on the bench behind Toni Martínez, a summer signing from West Ham United in England. However, he scored on his top flight debut in a victory over Santa Clara on 10 August on the first weekend of the season. Anderson scored 4 goals off the bench as the club started the season undefeated through seven games and top of the table. This included a pair of goals against Belenenses SAD on 28 September to clinch a 3–1 victory. Anderson was given his first start in the top flight for the club's next game, a meeting with Porto, who were just a point behind Famalicão, on 27 October. Anderson lasted over an hour before being replaced by fit-again Nicolás Schiappacasse in a 3–0 defeat. He was dropped to the bench for the club's next game four days later, but he scored a goal in their 2–1 victory over Gil Vicente.

On 31 July 2021, Anderson joined Chinese Super League club Beijing Guoan. Anderson left Beijing Guoan after the 2021 season.

On 20 May 2022, Anderson signed with Vitória de Guimarães.

On 4 July 2023, Anderson signed for Süper Lig club Alanyaspor on a four-year contract.

On 13 July 2024, Cypriot First Division club Pafos announced the loan signing of Anderson from Alanyaspor. On 23 June 2025, Pafos announced the permanent signing of Anderson from Alanyaspor, on a contract until the summer of 2028.

== Personal life ==
He is a twin brother of André Clóvis.

== Career statistics ==
As of match played 15 October 2026

Appearances and goals by club, season and competition
Club	Season	League			National cup (Note: Includes Taça de Portugal, Turkish Cup, Cypriot Cup)		League cup (Note: Includes Taça da Liga)		Continental		Other		Total		
Club	Season	Division	Apps	Goals	Apps	Goals	Apps	Goals	Apps	Goals	Apps	Goals	Apps	Goals	
Famalicão	2017–18	LigaPro	22	2	2	0	0	0	—		—		24	2	
Famalicão	2018–19	LigaPro	30	9	1	0	1	0	—		—		32	9	
Famalicão	2019–20	Primeira Liga	31	7	4	1	1	0	—		—		36	8	
Famalicão	2020–21	Primeira Liga	22	7	0	0	—		—		—		22	7	
Famalicão	2021–22	Primeira Liga	—		—		1	0	—		—		1	0	
Famalicão	Total		105	25	7	1	3	1	—		—		115	26	
Beijing Guoan	2021	Chinese Super League	8	2	0	0	—		—		—		8	2	
Vitória de Guimarães	2022–23	Primeira Liga	30	4	2	1	2	1	4 (Note: Appearances in UEFA Conference League)	2	—		38	8	
Alanyaspor	2023–24	Süper Lig	11	0	2	2	—		—		—		13	2	
Pafos (loan)	2024–25	Cypriot First Division	35	11	5	3	—		16	3	1 (Note: Appearance in Cypriot Super Cup)	0	57	17	
Pafos	2025–26	Cypriot First Division	33	9	3	3	—		13 (Note: Appearances in UEFA Champions League)	2	1 (Note: Appearance in Cypriot Super Cup)	0	50	14	
Pafos	2026–27	Cypriot First Division	3	0	0	0	—		4 (Note: One appearance in UEFA Europa League, three appearances and one goal in UEFA Conference League)	1	1	0	8	1	
Pafos	Career total			264	51	20	10	10	2	37	8	3	1	362	71

== Honours ==
Pafos

- Cypriot First Division: 2024–25
- Cypriot Cup: 2025–26
- Cypriot Super Cup: 2026
