= Neofytos Michail =

Cypriot footballer

Personal information
- Date of birth: 16 December 1993 (age 32)
- Place of birth: Nicosia, Cyprus
- Height: 1.90 m (6 ft 3 in)
- Position: Goalkeeper

Team information
- Current team: Universitatea Cluj
- Number: 93

Youth career
- –2013: Olympiakos Nicosia

Senior career*
Years	Team	Apps	(Gls)
2013–2014	Olympiakos Nicosia	2	(0)
2014	→ THOI Lakatamia (loan)	12	(0)
2014–2015	THOI Lakatamia	25	(0)
2015–2017	Nea Salamina	26	(0)
2017–2022	APOEL	9	(0)
2017–2018	→ Aris Limassol (loan)	1	(0)
2018–2019	→ PAS Giannina (loan)	9	(0)
2019–2020	→ Asteras Tripolis (loan)	1	(0)
2020–2021	→ Olympiakos Nicosia (loan)	27	(0)
2022–2024	Anorthosis Famagusta	17	(0)
2024–2026	Pafos	27	(0)
2026–	Universitatea Cluj	2	(0)

International career^{‡}
2019–	Cyprus	17	(0)
- * Club domestic league appearances and goals as of 26 July 2026 ‡ National team caps and goals as of 26 March 2026

Neofytos Michail (Greek: Νεόφυτος Μιχαήλ; born 16 December 1993) is a Cypriot professional footballer who plays as a goalkeeper for Liga I club Universitatea Cluj and the Cyprus national team.

== Club career ==
=== Anorthosis Famagusta ===
On 24 June 2022, Michail signed with Cypriot First Division club Anorthosis Famagusta on a two-year contract until 2024.

== International career ==
Michael was called up to the senior Cyprus squad for a friendly against Serbia in May 2016.

He made his debut on 19 November 2019 in a Euro 2020 qualifier against Belgium, which ended in 1–6 loss for Cyprus.

== Career statistics ==
=== Club ===
As of 30 July 2026

Club	Season	League			National Cup (Note: Includes Cypriot Cup, Greek Cup)		Europe		Other		Total	
Club	Season	Division	Apps	Goals	Apps	Goals	Apps	Goals	Apps	Goals	Apps	Goals
Olympiakos Nicosia	2013–14	Cypriot Second Division	2	0	0	0	—		—		2	0
THOI Lakatamia (loan)	2013–14	Cypriot Third Division	12	0	—		—		—		12	0
THOI Lakatamia	2014–15	Cypriot Third Division	25	0	0	0	—		—		25	0
THOI Lakatamia	Total		37	0	0	0	—		—		37	0
Nea Salamina	2015–16	Cypriot First Division	21	0	1	0	—		—		22	0
Nea Salamina	2016–17	Cypriot First Division	5	0	1	0	—		—		6	0
Nea Salamina	Total		26	0	2	0	—		—		28	0
Aris Limassol (loan)	2017–18	Cypriot First Division	1	0	2	0	—		—		3	0
PAS Giannina (loan)	2018–19	Super League Greece	9	0	4	0	—		—		13	0
Asteras Tripolis (loan)	2019–20	Super League Greece	1	0	2	0	—		—		3	0
Olympiakos Nicosia (loan)	2020–21	Cypriot First Division	27	0	5	0	—		—		32	0
APOEL	2021–22	Cypriot First Division	9	0	5	0	—		—		14	0
Anorthosis Famagusta	2022–23	Cypriot First Division	6	0	0	0	—		—		6	0
Anorthosis Famagusta	2023–24	Cypriot First Division	11	0	1	0	—		—		12	0
Anorthosis Famagusta	Total		17	0	1	0	—		—		18	0
Pafos	2024–25	Cypriot First Division	8	0	1	0	1 (Note: Appearances in UEFA Conference League)	0	0	0	10	0
Pafos	2025–26	Cypriot First Division	19	0	2	0	12 (Note: Appearances in UEFA Champions League)	0	1 (Note: Appearance in Cypriot Super Cup)	0	34	0
Pafos	Total		27	0	3	0	13	0	1	0	44	0
Universitatea Cluj	2026–27	Liga I	2	0	0	0	4 (Note: Two appearances in UEFA Europa League, two appearances in UEFA Conference League)	0	0	0	6	0
Career total			158	0	24	0	17	0	1	0	200	0

=== International ===
As of match played 26 March 2026

Appearances and goals by national team and year
National team	Year	Apps	Goals
Cyprus	2019	1	0
Cyprus	2020	0	0
Cyprus	2021	9	0
Cyprus	2022	5	0
Cyprus	2023	0	0
Cyprus	2024	0	0
Cyprus	2025	1	0
Cyprus	2026	1	0
Total		17	0

== Honours ==
THOI Lakatamia

- Cypriot Third Division: 2014–15

Olympiakos Nicosia

- Cypriot Cup runner-up: 2020–21

Pafos

- Cypriot First Division: 2024–25
- Cypriot Cup: 2025–26
- Cypriot Super Cup runner-up: 2024, 2025

Universitatea Cluj

- Supercupa României runner-up: 2026
