= João Correia (footballer, born 1996) =

Cape Verdean footballer (born 1996)

Personal information
- Full name: João Pedro Araújo Correia
- Date of birth: 5 September 1996 (age 30)
- Place of birth: Setúbal, Portugal
- Height: 1.75 m (5 ft 9 in)
- Position: Right back

Team information
- Current team: Pafos
- Number: 77

Youth career
- 2005–2007: Amarelos
- 2007–2009: Palhavã
- 2009–2012: Amarelos
- 2012–2015: Pinhalnovense

Senior career*
Years	Team	Apps	(Gls)
2015	Pinhalnovense	7	(5)
2015–2020	Vitória Guimarães B	95	(11)
2019–2020	→ Chaves (loan)	12	(0)
2020–2024	Chaves	109	(9)
2024–	Pafos	84	(17)

International career^{‡}
2022–	Cape Verde	4	(0)
- * Club domestic league appearances and goals as of 19:05, 11 October 2026 (UTC) ‡ National team caps and goals as of 22:18, 16 November 2023 (UTC)

João Pedro Araújo Correia (born 5 September 1996) is a professional footballer who plays for Pafos FC as a right back. Born in Portugal, he plays for the Cape Verde national team.

== Football career ==
On 8 August 2015, Correia made his professional debut with Vitória Guimarães B in a 2015–16 Segunda Liga match against Santa Clara.

== International career ==
Born in Portugal, Correa is of Cape Verdean descent. He was called up to represent the Cape Verde national team for a set of friendlies in March 2022. He debuted with Cape Verde in a 2–0 friendly win over Guadeloupe.

== Career statistics ==
=== Club ===
As of match played 15 October 2026

Club	Season	League			National Cup		League Cup		Continental		Other		Total	
Club	Season	Division	Apps	Goals	Apps	Goals	Apps	Goals	Apps	Goals	Apps	Goals	Apps	Goals
Vitória Guimarães	2019–20	Primeira Liga	0	0	0	0	0	0	2 (Note: Appearanes in UEFA Europa League)	0	—		2	0
Chaves (loan)	2019–20	Liga Portugal 2	12	0	1	0	2	0	—		—		15	0
Chaves	2020–21	Liga Portugal 2	27	4	0	0	0	0	—		—		27	4
Chaves	2021–22	Liga Portugal 2	28	2	0	0	1	1	—		—		29	3
Chaves	2022–23	Primeira Liga	24	0	1	0	2	0	—		—		27	0
Chaves	2023–24	Primeira Liga	30	3	1	0	1	1	—		—		32	4
Chaves	Total		109	9	2	0	4	2	—		—		115	11
Pafos	2024–25	Cypriot First Division	30	7	3	0	—		15 (Note: Two appearances in UEFA Europa League, thirteen appearances and three goals in UEFA Conference League)	3	1 (Note: Appearance in Cypriot Super Cup)	0	49	10
Pafos	2025–26	Cypriot First Division	23	10	2	0	—		9 (Note: Appearances in UEFA Champions League)	2	1	0	35	12
Pafos	2026–27	Cypriot First Division	1	0	0	0	—		4 (Note: One appearance and one goal in UEFA Europa League, three appearances in UEFA Conference League)	1	0	0	5	1
Pafos	Total		54	17	4	0	—		28	6	2	0	89	23
Career total			175	26	8	0	6	2	30	6	2	0	221	34

=== International ===
As of match played 16 November 2023

Appearances and goals by national team and year
National team	Year	Apps	Goals
Cape Verde	2022	3	0
Cape Verde	2023	1	0
Total		4	0

== Honours ==
Pafos

- Cypriot First Division: 2024–25
- Cypriot Cup: 2025–26
- Cypriot Super Cup: 2026
