= Pedro Pelágio =

Portuguese association football player

Personal information
- Full name: Pedro Henrique Rocha Pelágio
- Date of birth: 21 April 2000 (age 26)
- Place of birth: Funchal, Portugal
- Height: 1.81 m (5 ft 11 in)
- Position: Midfielder

Team information
- Current team: Chaves
- Number: 11

Youth career
- 2009–2011: Marítimo
- 2011–2012: CF Formação da Madeira
- 2012–2019: Marítimo

Senior career*
Years	Team	Apps	(Gls)
2018–2022	Marítimo B	5	(0)
2018–2023	Marítimo	74	(0)
2022–2023	→ Pafos (loan)	16	(0)
2023–2025	Pafos	14	(0)
2024	→ United (loan)	6	(0)
2024–2025	→ Chaves (loan)	27	(0)
2025–	Chaves	4	(0)

International career
2019	Portugal U19	2	(0)
2019	Portugal U20	2	(0)
- * Club domestic league appearances and goals as of 19:03, 9 March 2026 (UTC)

Pedro Henrique Rocha Pelágio (born 21 April 2000) is a Portuguese professional footballer who plays as a midfielder for Liga Portugal 2 club Chaves.

== Club career ==
=== Marítimo ===
Born in Funchal, Madeira, Pelágio joined C.S. Marítimo's academy at the age of 9. He made his competitive debut with the first team on 29 December 2018, playing the entire 0–1 home loss against G.D. Estoril Praia in the group stage of the Taça da Liga.

Pelágio appeared in his first match in the Primeira Liga on 5 January 2019, coming on as a late substitute in the 2–1 win over Portimonense S.C. also at the Estádio do Marítimo.

=== Pafos ===
On 5 August 2022, Pelágio was loaned to Pafos FC for one year. In June 2023, the move was made permanent after the Cypriot First Division club exercised a purchase option for €200,000.

Pelágio made his debut in European competitions on 11 July 2024, featuring 90 minutes of the 3–0 defeat away to IF Elfsborg in the first qualifying round of the UEFA Europa League. He also took part in the second leg, a 5–2 loss.

=== Chaves ===
For the 2024–25 season, Pelágio agreed to a loan at G.D. Chaves of the Liga Portugal 2. On 2 July 2025, having totalled 29 appearances, he signed a three-year contract.

== International career ==
On 3 January 2019, Pelágio received a callup to the Portugal under-19 side.

== Career statistics ==
As of match played 28 May 2023

Club	Season	League			National Cup		League Cup		Continental		Other		Total	
Club	Season	Division	Apps	Goals	Apps	Goals	Apps	Goals	Apps	Goals	Apps	Goals	Apps	Goals
Marítimo	2018–19	Primeira Liga	12	0	0	0	1	0	—		—		13	0
Marítimo	2019–20	Primeira Liga	16	0	0	0	0	0	—		—		16	0
Marítimo	2020–21	Primeira Liga	23	0	2	0	0	0	—		—		25	0
Marítimo	2021–22	Primeira Liga	23	0	1	0	1	0	—		—		25	0
Marítimo	Total		74	0	3	0	2	0	—		—		79	0
Pafos (loan)	2022–23	Cypriot First Division	16	0	3	0	—		—		—		19	0
Career total			90	0	6	0	2	0	0	0	0	0	98	0
