= Marios Ilia (footballer) =

Cypriot footballer (born 1996)

Personal information
- Date of birth: 19 May 1996 (age 30)
- Place of birth: Larnaca, Cyprus
- Height: 1.83 m (6 ft 0 in)
- Position: Forward

Team information
- Current team: Anorthosis Famagusta
- Number: 70

Youth career
- 2008–2015: Ethnikos Achna

Senior career*
Years	Team	Apps	(Gls)
2014–2016	Ethnikos Achna	25	(5)
2016–2019	AEL Limassol	20	(1)
2018–2019	→ Alki Oroklini (loan)	23	(2)
2019–2024	Ethnikos Achna	118	(35)
2022–2023	→ APOEL (loan)	13	(1)
2024–2025	Pafos	6	(0)
2025–	Anorthosis Famagusta	23	(1)

International career^{‡}
2015–2018	Cyprus U21	14	(1)
2015–	Cyprus	12	(1)
- * Club domestic league appearances and goals as of 14 June 2026 ‡ National team caps and goals as of 11 November 2020

Marios Ilia (Greek: Μάριος Ηλία; born 19 May 1996) is a Cypriot professional footballer who plays as a forward for Anorthosis Famagusta and the Cyprus national team.

== Career statistics ==
=== Club ===
As of match played 13 April 2024

Club	Season	League			Cypriot Cup		Continental		Total	
Club	Season	Division	Apps	Goals	Apps	Goals	Apps	Goals	Apps	Goals
Ethnikos Achna	2013–14	Cypriot First Division	1	0	0	0	–		1	0
Ethnikos Achna	2014–15	Cypriot First Division	4	2	0	0	–		4	2
Ethnikos Achna	2015–16	Cypriot First Division	20	3	3	0	–		23	3
Ethnikos Achna	Total		25	5	3	0	–		28	5
AEL	2016–17	Cypriot First Division	10	0	1	0	–		11	0
AEL	2017–18	Cypriot First Division	10	1	1	0	5 (Note: Appearances in UEFA Europa League)	2	16	3
AEL	Total		20	1	2	0	5	2	27	3
Alki Oroklini (loan)	2018–19	Cypriot First Division	22	2	1	0	–		23	2
Ethnikos Achna	2019–20	Cypriot First Division	16	3	3	0	–		19	3
Ethnikos Achna	2020–21	Cypriot First Division	34	10	3	2	–		37	12
Ethnikos Achna	2021–22	Cypriot First Division	29	3	7	2	–		36	5
Ethnikos Achna	2023–24	Cypriot First Division	34	16	1	1	–		35	17
Ethnikos Achna	Total		113	32	14	5	–		127	37
APOEL (loan)	2022–23	Cypriot First Division	13	1	2	0	6 (Note: Appearances in UEFA Europa Conference League)	0	21	1
Career total			193	41	22	5	11	2	226	48

=== International ===
Scores and results list Cyprus' goal tally first.

No.	Date	Venue	Opponent	Score	Result	Competition
1.	11 November 2020	Georgios Kamaras Stadium, Athens, Greece	Greece	1–2	1–2	Friendly

== Honours ==
Pafos

- Cypriot First Division: 2024–25

Individual

- Cypriot First Division top scorer: 2023–24
