= Matías Melluso =

Argentine footballer

Personal information
- Full name: Matías Germán Melluso
- Date of birth: 9 June 1998 (age 28)
- Place of birth: La Plata, Argentina
- Height: 1.70 m (5 ft 7 in)
- Position: Defender

Team information
- Current team: Gimnasia y Esgrima
- Number: 22

Youth career
- Gimnasia y Esgrima

Senior career*
Years	Team	Apps	(Gls)
2018–2023	Gimnasia y Esgrima	107	(0)
2023–2025	Pafos	12	(0)
2025–	Gimnasia y Esgrima	8	(0)
- * Club domestic league appearances and goals as of 17:23, 9 July 2026 (UTC)

Matías Germán Melluso (born 9 June 1998) is an Argentine professional footballer who plays as a defender for Gimnasia y Esgrima.

== Career ==
Melluso got his senior career started with Gimnasia y Esgrima in 2018. He was moved into the first-team by manager Facundo Sava during 2017–18, appearing on the substitutes bench on seven occasions prior to making his professional debut on 21 April during a defeat away to Talleres. Further appearances against Boca Juniors, Independiente and Newell's Old Boys followed as Gimnasia y Esgrima finished 23rd.

== Career statistics ==
As of 9 August 2024.

Club	Season	League			Cup		Continental		Other		Total	
Club	Season	Division	Apps	Goals	Apps	Goals	Apps	Goals	Apps	Goals	Apps	Goals
Gimnasia y Esgrima	2017–18	Primera División	4	0	6	0	—		—		8	0
Gimnasia y Esgrima	2018–19	Primera División	17	0	1	0	—		—		18	0
Gimnasia y Esgrima	2019–20	Primera División	24	0	1	0	—		—		25	0
Gimnasia y Esgrima	2020–21	Primera División	11	0	0	0	—		—		11	0
Gimnasia y Esgrima	2021	Primera División	15	0	0	0	—		—		15	0
Gimnasia y Esgrima	2022	Primera División	20	0	1	0	—		—		21	0
Gimnasia y Esgrima	2023	Primera División	16	0	1	0	4	0	—		21	0
Gimnasia y Esgrima	Total		107	0	10	0	4	0	—		121	0
Pafos	2023–24	Cypriot First Division	12	0	1	0	—		—		13	0
Pafos	2024–25	Cypriot First Division	0	0	0	0	4	0	0	0	4	0
Pafos	Total		12	0	1	0	4	0	0	0	17	0
Career total			119	0	11	0	8	0	0	0	138	0
