= 2024–25 AEK Larnaca FC season =

AEK Larnaca FC
2024–25 season
- Head coach: Juan Ferrando
- Stadium: AEK Arena – Georgios Karapatakis
- Cypriot First Division: 4th
- Cypriot Cup: Winners
- UEFA Conference League: Second qualifying round

The 2024–25 season was the 31st season in the history of AEK Larnaca FC, and the 15th consecutive season in Cypriot First Division. In addition to the domestic league, the team participated in the Cypriot Cup and the UEFA Conference League. They ended the season in 4th place in the league, but won the Cypriot Cup against Pafos FC in the final on penalties, which means they qualified for next year's Conference League.

== Transfers ==
=== In ===
Pos.	Player	Transferred from	Fee	Date	Source
DF	(Cyprus) Marios Dimitriou	(Cyprus) Pafos		1 July 2024	
GK	(Serbia) Zlatan Alomerović	(Poland) Jagiellonia Białystok	Free	1 July 2024	
MF	(Sweden) Marcus Rohdén	(Turkey) Fatih Karagümrük	Free	9 July 2024	
MF	(Venezuela) Yerson Chacón	(Venezuela) Deportivo Táchira	Loan	19 July 2024	

=== Out ===
Pos.	Player	Transferred to	Fee	Date	Source
MF	(Cyprus) Rafail Mamas	(Cyprus) AEL Limassol		1 July 2024	
DF	(Cyprus) Panagiotis Karagiorgis	(United States) Dartmouth College		1 July 2024	
MF	(Cyprus) Marios Tziortzis	(United States) Dartmouth Big Green		1 August 2024	

== Friendlies ==
=== Pre-season ===
29 June 2024 Friendly	Den Bosch (Netherlands)	2–1	(Cyprus) AEK Larnaca
17:00	Burgering 42'; Van Leeuwen 58'		Naoum 45'

3 July 2024 Friendly	PAOK (Greece)	2–1	(Cyprus) AEK Larnaca
18:00	Schwab 28'; Murg 39'		Cabrera 54'

6 July 2024 Friendly	Cercle Brugge (Belgium)	3–2	(Cyprus) AEK Larnaca	Venray, Netherlands
14:00	Olaigbe 19'; Somers 41', 51'	Report	Diemers 45'; Santos 53'	Stadium: Sportpark De Wieën

13 July 2024 Friendly	Panathinaikos (Greece)	3–1	(Cyprus) AEK Larnaca	Athens, Greece
21:00 UTC+3	Bakasetas 9', 51'; Vagiannidis 86'		Mladenović 85' (o.g.)	Stadium: Leoforos Alexandras Stadium

17 July 2024 Friendly	AEK Larnaca (Cyprus)	0–0	(Cyprus) APOEL
18:00

== Competitions ==
=== Overall record ===
Competition	First match	Last match	Starting round	Final position	Record							
Competition	First match	Last match	Starting round	Final position	Pld	W	D	L	GF	GA	GD	Win %
Cypriot First Division	25 August 2024	18 May 2025	Matchday 1	Fourth place	36	19	11	6	58	30	+28	52.78
Cypriot Cup	1 October 2024	24 May 2025	First round	Winners	6	5	1	0	18	1	+17	83.33
UEFA Conference League	25 July 2024	1 August 2024	Second qualifying round	Second qualifying round	2	0	0	2	0	5	−5	0.00
Total					44	24	12	8	76	36	+40	54.55

Last updated: 29 May 2024
Source: Soccerway

=== Cypriot First Division ===
==== League table ====
Pos	Team	Pld	W	D	L	GF	GA	GD	Pts	Qualification or relegation
1	Pafos	26	20	2	4	50	12	+38	62	Qualification for the Championship round
2	Aris Limassol	26	18	7	1	53	15	+38	61	Qualification for the Championship round
3	AEK Larnaca	26	16	6	4	45	21	+24	54	Qualification for the Championship round
4	Omonia	26	16	4	6	53	26	+27	52	Qualification for the Championship round
5	APOEL	26	12	7	7	52	25	+27	43	Qualification for the Championship round

Source: Soccerway
Rules for classification: 1) Points; 2) Head-to-head points; 3) Head-to-head goal difference; 4) Head-to-head goals scored; 5) Head-to-head away goals scored (only if two teams); 6) Goal difference; 7) Goals scored; 8) Play-off (only if deciding championship round, relegation round or relegation).

==== League table ====
Pos	Team	Pld	W	D	L	GF	GA	GD	Pts	Qualification
1	Pafos (C)	36	26	4	6	67	21	+46	82	Qualification for the Champions League second qualifying round
2	Aris Limassol	36	22	9	5	66	31	+35	75	Qualification for the Conference League second qualifying round
3	Omonia	36	20	8	8	69	40	+29	68	Qualification for the Conference League second qualifying round
4	AEK Larnaca	36	19	11	6	58	30	+28	68	Qualification for the Europa League first qualifying round (Note: The winner of the 2024–25 Cypriot Cup (AEK Larnaca) qualified for the Europa League first qualifying round.)
5	APOEL	36	14	11	11	59	36	+23	53	
6	Apollon Limassol	36	12	10	14	37	39	−2	46	

Source: Soccerway
Rules for classification: 1) Points; 2) Head-to-head points; 3) Head-to-head goal difference; 4) Head-to-head goals scored; 5) Head-to-head away goals scored (only if two teams); 6) Goal difference; 7) Goals scored; 8) Play-off (only if deciding championship round, relegation round or relegation).
(C) Champions

==== Results summary ====
Overall								Home						Away					
Pld	W	D	L	GF	GA	GD	Pts	W	D	L	GF	GA	GD	W	D	L	GF	GA	GD
36	19	11	6	58	30	+28	68	12	4	2	34	13	+21	7	7	4	24	17	+7

Last updated: 18 May 2025.
Source: Soccerway

===== Results by round =====
Round	1	2	3	4	5	6	7	8	9	10	11	12	13	14	15	16	17	18	19	20	21	22	23	24	25	26	27	28	29	30	31	32	33	34	35	36
Ground	A	H	A	H	A	A	H	A	H	A	H	A	H	H	A	H	A	H	H	A	H	A	H	A	H	A	A	H	A	A	H	H	A	H	H	A
Result	W	L	L	D	W	W	W	D	W	D	W	W	W	W	W	L	D	W	W	D	W	D	W	W	W	L	D	D	W	D	D	D	L	W	W	L
Position	6	8	8	8	6	6	5	6	5	5	4	4	3	3	3	3	3	3	3	3	3	4	4	3	3	3	3	3	3	3	3	3	3	3	3	4

Updated to match(es) played on 18 May 2025. Source: worldfootball
A = Away; H = Home; W = Win; D = Draw; L = Loss

==== Matches ====
25 August 2024 1	Apollon	1–2	AEK Larnaca	Kolossi
20:00 EET	Bruno Santos (yellow card) 12'; Vouros (yellow card) 17'; Pedro Marques 21'; D'Almeida (red card) 45+5'; Weissbeck (yellow card) 58'	Report	Miličević (yellow card) 48'; Faraj (yellow card) 51'; Ekpolo 70'; Bruno Gama 80'	Stadium: Alphamega Stadium; Attendance: 7,800; Referee: (Cyprus) Ioannis Christodoulou

1 September 2024 2	AEK Larnaca	0–2	Pafos	Larnaca
18:30 EET	Cabrera (yellow card) 81'; Angielski (yellow card) 89'	Report	Jairo 17'; Jajá (yellow card) 27'; Anderson Silva 66'; Bruno Felipe (yellow card) 69'; Dragomir (yellow card) 85'; Léo Natel (yellow card) 90+5'	Stadium: AEK Arena – Georgios Karapatakis; Attendance: 3,500; Referee: (Cyprus) Menelaos Antoniou

16 September 2024 3	Omonia Nicosia	1–0	AEK Larnaca	Nicosia
19:00 EET	Ewandro 23'; Kousoulos (yellow card) 69'; Diounkou (yellow card) 71'; Eraković (yellow card) 78'; Kakoullis (yellow card) 88'	Report	Aitor Cantalapiedra (yellow card) 43'; Athanasiadis (yellow card) 45+3'	Stadium: GSP Stadium; Attendance: 11,400; Referee: (Cyprus) Marios Christoforou

22 September 2024 4	AEK Larnaca	2–2	Ethnikos Achnas	Larnaca
19:00 EET	Cabrera (yellow card) 41'; Bruno Gama 54'; Ofori 63' (o.g.)	Report	de Iriondo (yellow card) 3'; Pablo González 22'; Julián Bonetto (yellow card) 26'; Lipski (yellow card) 45+3' (goal) 71'; Breno Almeida (yellow card) 87'; Jalil Saadi (yellow card) 90'	Stadium: AEK Arena – Georgios Karapatakis; Attendance: 2,500; Referee: (Cyprus) Constantinos Photiou

27 September 2024 5	Nea Salamis	1–3	AEK Larnaca	Larnaca
19:00 EET	Gbelle (yellow card) 66' (goal) 73'; Durmishaj (yellow card) 83'	Report	Bejarano 31' (o.g.); Jorge Miramón (yellow card) 37'; Cabrera 49' (yellow card) 49'; Faraj (yellow card) 75'; Rohdén (yellow card) 88' (goal) 90+4'; Angielski (yellow card) 90+2'	Stadium: Ammochostos Stadium; Attendance: 1,800; Referee: (Cyprus) Panagiotis Hadjigeorghiou

6 October 2024 6	APOEL	0–1	AEK Larnaca	Nicosia
20:00 EET	Pizzi (yellow card) 29'; Chebake (yellow card) 79'	Report	Aitor Cantalapiedra (yellow card) 19'; Rohdén (yellow card) 44'; Pere Pons (yellow card) 71'; Faraj 77'	Stadium: GSP Stadium; Attendance: 8,000; Referee: (Cyprus) Konstantinos Fellas

20 October 2024 7	AEK Larnaca	1–0	Anorthosis	Larnaca
19:00 EET	Fran Sol 13'; Ángel García (yellow card) 30'	Report	André Teixeira (yellow card) 40'; Artymatas (yellow card) 55'; Chrysopoulos (yellow card) 89'	Stadium: AEK Arena – Georgios Karapatakis; Attendance: 4,000; Referee: (Cyprus) Marios Christoforou

27 October 2024 8	AEL	1–1	AEK Larnaca	Kolossi
19:00 EET	Markis 22' (pen.); Singh (yellow card) 45+1'; Ouédraogo (yellow card) 89'	Report	Cabrera 26'; Pere Pons (yellow card) 63'	Stadium: Alphamega Stadium; Referee: (Cyprus) Chrysovalantis Theouli

3 November 2024 9	AEK Larnaca	2–0	Aris Limassol	Larnaca
19:00 EET	Jimmy (yellow card) 21'; Cabrera (yellow card) 32'; Aitor Cantalapiedra 41'; Miličević (yellow card) 44'; Faraj (yellow card) 56'; Pere Pons 58'	Report	Bengtsson (yellow card) 51'; Matysik (yellow card) 82'	Stadium: AEK Arena – Georgios Karapatakis; Attendance: 3,000; Referee: (Denmark) Jakob Sundberg

9 November 2024 10	Enosis	0–0	AEK Larnaca	Paralimni
17:00 EET	Piotr Janczukowicz (yellow card) 22' (yellow-red card) 90+1'; Adeleye (yellow card) 69'; Fotis Kotsonis (yellow card) 80'	Report	Ángel García (yellow card) 73'; Cabrera (yellow card) 75' (yellow-red card) 75'	Stadium: Paralimni Stadium; Attendance: 1,600; Referee: (Cyprus) Ioannis Christodoulou

25 November 2024 11	AEK Larnaca	2–0	Karmiotissa	Larnaca
19:00 EET	Angielski 17'; Ángel García 81'	Report	Tsoukalas (yellow card) 45'; Giousis (yellow card) 69'; Bojan Kovačević (yellow card) 80'	Stadium: AEK Arena – Georgios Karapatakis; Attendance: 1,000; Referee: (Cyprus) Demetris Solomou

1 December 2024 12	PAC Omonia 29M	1–5	AEK Larnaca	Peristerona
19:00 EET	Pavlou (yellow card) 19'; Gabriel Ramos (yellow card) 60'; Konstantinos Pattichis (yellow card) 77'; Trujić 86' (pen.)	Report	Fran Sol 4' 52' 90+2'; Angielski 20'; Chacón 35'; Gus Ledes (yellow card) 45'	Stadium: Katokopia Stadium; Attendance: 400; Referee: (Cyprus) Andreas Argyrou

6 December 2024 13	AEK Larnaca	1–0	Omonia Aradippou	Larnaca
19:00 EET	Cabrera 72'; Aitor Cantalapiedra (yellow card) 90+3'	Report	Rafael Moreira (yellow card) 20'; Karim Mekkaoui (yellow card) 31'; Kallis (yellow card) 45'; Giorgos Pontikos (yellow card) 63'	Stadium: AEK Arena – Georgios Karapatakis; Attendance: 1,900; Referee: (Cyprus) Panagiotis Hadjigeorghiou

15 December 2024 14	AEK Larnaca	4–0	Apollon	Larnaca
17:00 EET	Aitor Cantalapiedra 41' (pen.); Chacón 42' 75'; Faraj 56' (yellow card) 74'	Report	Weissbeck (yellow card) 35'; Célestine (yellow card) 40'; Drožđek (yellow card) 49'; Sagal (yellow card) 88'	Stadium: AEK Arena – Georgios Karapatakis; Attendance: 3,300; Referee: (Denmark) Mikkel Redder

22 December 2024 15	Pafos	0–1	AEK Larnaca	Paphos
18:00 EET	Šunjić (yellow card) 47'; Dragomir (yellow card) 69'; Rafael Pontelo (yellow card) 76' (yellow-red card) 85'	Report	Cabrera 17'; Jorge Miramón (yellow card) 20'; Ekpolo (yellow card) 39'; Katelaris (yellow card) 40'; Pere Pons (yellow card) 70'	Stadium: Stelios Kyriakides Stadium; Attendance: 5,800; Referee: (Italy) Juan Luca Sacchi

3 January 2025 16	AEK Larnaca	0–3	Omonia Nicosia	Larnaca
19:45 EET	Henriques (yellow card) 30'	Report	Kakoullis 30' 89' (yellow card) 90'; Jovetić (yellow card) 37'; Fabiano Freitas (yellow card) 52'; Diounkou (yellow card) 55'; Charalampous (yellow card) 80'; Alioum 90+5'	Stadium: AEK Arena – Georgios Karapatakis; Attendance: 4,240; Referee: (Italy) Alessandro Prontera

8 January 2025 17	Ethnikos Achna	2–2	AEK Larnaca	Achna
19:00 EET	Pablo González 10'; Ofori (yellow card) 73'; Bahanack (yellow card) 75'; Julián Bonetto 80' (pen.); Panagiotou (yellow card) 90+3'	Report	Aitor Cantalapiedra 16'; Cabrera 37'; Ángel García (yellow card) 88'	Stadium: Dasaki Stadium; Attendance: 1,200; Referee: (Cyprus) Chrysovalantis Theouli

12 January 2025 18	AEK Larnaca	2–0	Nea Salamis	Larnaca
17:00 EET	Faraj 5'; Henriques (yellow card) 24'; Aitor Cantalapiedra 39'	Report	Antosch (red card) 18'	Stadium: AEK Arena – Georgios Karapatakis; Attendance: 3,100; Referee: (Cyprus) Constantinos Photiou

20 January 2025 19	AEK Larnaca	2–1	APOEL	Larnaca
19:00 EET	Gus Ledes (yellow card) 23'; Pere Pons (yellow card) 32'; Cabrera 45'; Chacón 50'	Report	Laifis (yellow card) 26'; Sotiriou 75'; Sergio Tejera (yellow card) 84'	Stadium: AEK Arena – Georgios Karapatakis; Referee: (Switzerland) Alessandro Dudic

25 January 2025 20	Anorthosis	2–2	AEK Larnaca	Larnaca
19:00 EET	Ioannou (yellow card) 45+4'; Iliev 58' (pen.) 90+10' (pen.); Kargas (yellow card) 63'	Report	Aitor Cantalapiedra 14' (yellow card) 76'; Cabrera 32'; Chacón (yellow card) 63'	Stadium: Antonis Papadopoulos Stadium; Attendance: 5,500; Referee: (Lithuania) Donatas Rumšas

2 February 2025 21	AEK Larnaca	2–0	AEL	Larnaca
19:00 EET	Faraj 28'; Gus Ledes (yellow card) 44'; Pere Pons 86'	Report	Makris (yellow card) 13'; Kypros Neophytou (yellow card) 59'	Stadium: AEK Arena – Georgios Karapatakis; Attendance: 2,900; Referee: (Italy) Juan Luca Sacchi

9 February 2025 22	Aris Limassol	1–1	AEK Larnaca	Kolossi
19:00 EET	Yago (yellow card) 17' (yellow-red card) 87'; Struski (yellow card) 30'; Boakye (yellow card) 44'; Markhiyev (yellow card) 45+3'; Miličević 46' (o.g.); Edi Semedo (yellow card) 86'	Report	Aitor Cantalapiedra 24' (red card) 58'	Stadium: Alphamega Stadium; Attendance: 1,500; Referee: (Austria) Christian-Petru Ciochirca

14 February 2025 23	AEK Larnaca	4–1	Enosis	Larnaca
19:30 EET	Cabrera 4' 43'; Angielski 8'; Fran Sol 80'	Report	Sean Ioannou (yellow card) 17' (goal) 29'; Adeleye (yellow card) 25'; Hoogenhout (yellow card) 66'	Stadium: AEK Arena – Georgios Karapatakis; Attendance: 1,900; Referee: (Cyprus) Menelaos Antoniou

22 February 2025 24	Karmiotissa	0–3	AEK Larnaca	Larnaca
17:00 EET		Report	Cabrera (yellow card) 29'; Rohdén (yellow card) 32'; Angielski 45+5'; Faraj 70'; Miličević 80'; Chacón (yellow card) 84'	Stadium: Ammochostos Stadium; Attendance: 900; Referee: (Cyprus) Marios Christoforou

2 March 2025 25	AEK Larnaca	2–0	Omonia 29M	Larnaca
19:00 EET	Ekpolo 30' (yellow card) 47'; Cabrera 84'	Report	Ikoko (yellow card) 26'; Nlandu (yellow card) 30'; García (yellow card) 34'; Alberto (yellow card) 67'; Konomis (yellow card) 69'	Stadium: AEK Arena – Georgios Karapatakis; Attendance: 1,500; Referee: (Cyprus) Demetris Solomou

9 March 2025 26	Omonia Aradippou	2–0	AEK Larnaca	Larnaca
19:00 EET	Karim Mekkaoui (yellow card) 32'; Kallis (yellow card) 67'; Nikolas Koutsakos 76' (yellow card) 76'; Mika Borges 90+10'	Report	Aitor Cantalapiedra (yellow card) 86'; Roberge (yellow card) 90+3'; Miličević (yellow card) 90+6'; Fran Sol (yellow card) 90+9'	Stadium: Antonis Papadopoulos Stadium; Attendance: 1,500; Referee: (Cyprus) Ioannis Christodoulou

16 March 2025 27	Omonia Nicosia	1–1	AEK Larnaca	Nicosia
20:30 EET	Stępiński 2'; Marić (yellow card) 13' (yellow-red card) 40'; Khammas (yellow card) 90+4'	Report	Ángel García (yellow card) 57'; Aitor Cantalapiedra 70'	Stadium: GSP Stadium; Attendance: 7,500; Referee: (Italy) Antonio Rapuano

29 March 2025 28	AEK Larnaca	1–1	Aris Limassol	Larnaca
19:00 EET	Ángel García (yellow card) 33'; Aitor Cantalapiedra 35'; Cabrera (yellow card) 40' (yellow-red card) 73'; Athanasiadis (yellow card) 77'; Pere Pons (yellow card) 85'	Report	Bengtsson 38'; Vaná (yellow card) 39'; Kvilitaia (yellow card) 39'; Struski (yellow card) 62'; Mayambela (yellow card) 66'; Opoku Sarfo (yellow card) 90+4'	Stadium: AEK Arena – Georgios Karapatakis; Attendance: 4,000; Referee: (Slovakia) Filip Glova

2 April 2025 29	APOEL	0–1	AEK Larnaca	Nicosia
19:30 EET	Sotiriou (yellow card) 71'; Meyer (yellow card) 82'; Satsias (yellow card) 90+2'	Report	Cantalapiedra 44'; Pons (yellow card) 89'	Stadium: GSP Stadium; Attendance: 5,000; Referee: (Italy) Ermanno Feliciani

6 April 2025 30	Apollon	1–1	AEK Larnaca	Kolossi
18:00 EET	Malekkidis (yellow card) 38'; Dorregaray 45' (pen.); Duodu (yellow card) 51'; Kvída (yellow card) 77'	Report	García (yellow card) 15'; Cabrera 55'	Stadium: Alphamega Stadium; Attendance: 4,300; Referee: (Montenegro) Nikola Dabanović

13 April 2025 31	AEK Larnaca	2–2	Pafos	Larnaca
19:00 EET	Faraj (yellow card) 26'; Ledes (yellow card) 39'; Cantalapiedra 45+2'; Rohdén 58'; Gnali (yellow card) 71'; Cabrera (yellow card) 83'	Report	Tanković 24' (yellow card) 69'; Šunjić 41'; Bruno (yellow card) 47'; Correia (yellow card) 70'	Stadium: AEK Arena – Georgios Karapatakis; Attendance: 3,200; Referee: (Bulgaria) Georgi Kabakov

22 April 2025 32	AEK Larnaca	1–1	Omonia Nicosia	Larnaca
19:00 EET	Cabrera 54'	Report	Diounkou (yellow card) 27'; Eraković 43'; Bezus (yellow card) 67'	Stadium: AEK Arena – Georgios Karapatakis; Attendance: 3,500; Referee: (Portugal) Miguel Nogueira

27 April 2025 33	Aris Limassol	1–0	AEK Larnaca	Kolossi
19:00 EET	Struski 4'; Correia (yellow card) 71'; Bengtsson (yellow card) 76'; Yago (yellow card) 90+1'	Report		Stadium: Alphamega Stadium; Attendance: 1,500; Referee: (Poland) Damian Sylwestrzak

4 May 2025 34	AEK Larnaca	3–0	APOEL	Larnaca
19:00 EET	Naoum 6'; Rohdén (yellow card) 22'; Gama 39' 57'	Report	Chebake (yellow card) 37'; Antoniou (yellow card) 47'; Satsias (yellow card) 67'	Stadium: AEK Arena – Georgios Karapatakis; Attendance: 2,400; Referee: (Denmark) Jacob Karlsen

12 May 2025 35	AEK Larnaca	3–0	Apollon	Larnaca
19:00 EET	Angielski 9' 28' (pen.) 54'	Report	Wouter (yellow card) 62'; Marques (yellow card) 76'; Adoni (yellow card) 77'	Stadium: AEK Arena – Georgios Karapatakis; Referee: (Cyprus) Marios Christoforou

18 May 2025 36	Pafos	2–0	AEK Larnaca	Paphos
18:00 EET	Šunjić 10'; Oršić (yellow card) 34'; Goldar (yellow card) 42'; Quina 67'; Sema (yellow card) 81'	Report	Angielski (yellow card) 69'	Stadium: Stelios Kyriakides Stadium; Attendance: 9,400; Referee: (Cyprus) Ioannis Christodoulou

=== Cypriot Cup ===
1 October 2024 First Round	AEK Larnaca	5–0	Akritas Chlorakas	Larnaca
19:00 EET	Angielski 29'; Aitor Cantalapiedra 45+1' 55' 70'; Dimitriou 85'	Report		Stadium: AEK Arena – Georgios Karapatakis; Attendance: 1,450; Referee: (Cyprus) A Tehrani

10 December 2024 Second Round	AEK Larnaca	8–0	PAEEK	Larnaca
19:00 EET	Jimmy 16'; Cabrera 22' 31'; Aitor Cantalapiedra 51'; Faraj 57'; Fran Sol 68'; Bruno Gama 85'; Matías González 87'	Report	Christos Pasiardis (yellow card) 7'; Kelvin Kyei (yellow card) 38'; Giorgos Pavlidis (yellow card) 56'	Stadium: AEK Arena – Georgios Karapatakis; Attendance: 1,000; Referee: (Cyprus) Antonis Konstantinidis

29 January 2025 Quarter-finals	Enosis	0–3	AEK Larnaca	Paralimni
18:30 EET	Sean Ioannou (yellow card) 62'; Adeleye (yellow card) 74'; Andreas Christofi (yellow card) 90+2'; Seedorf (yellow card) 90+3'	Report	Fliter 44' (o.g.); Miličević 45+6'; Cabrera 69'	Stadium: Paralimni Stadium; Attendance: 1,200; Referee: (Cyprus) Ioannis Christodoulou

30 April 2025 Semi-final 1st leg	Omonia Nikosia	0–0	AEK Larnaca	Nicosia
19:00 EET	Stępiński (red card) 28'; Marić (yellow card) 66'; Charalampous (yellow card) 81'	Report	Chacón (yellow card) 45+3'; Faraj (yellow card) 90+3'	Stadium: GSP Stadium; Attendance: 12,600; Referee: (Romania) Radu Petrescu

7 May 2025 Semi-final 2nd leg	AEK Larnaca	2–1 (2–1 agg.)	Omonia Nikosia	Larnaca
19:00 EET	Cantalapiedra (red card) 9'; Faraj 11'; Miličević 63' (pen.)	Report	Charalampous (yellow card) 9'; Loizou 32'; Eraković (yellow card) 43'; Marić (yellow card) 62'; Jovetić (yellow card) 67'; Masouras (yellow card) 76'	Stadium: AEK Arena – Georgios Karapatakis; Attendance: 5,300; Referee: (Sweden) Srdjan Stojanovic

24 May 2025 Final	AEK Larnaca	0–0 (a.e.t.) (5–4 p)	Pafos	Nicosia
20:00 EET	Roberge (yellow card) 81'; Miličević (yellow card) 103'	Report	Šarlija (yellow card) 52'; Bruno (yellow card) 88'	Stadium: GSP Stadium; Attendance: 14,000; Referee: (Germany) Daniel Siebert
	Penalties
	Miličević (penalty scored); Angielski (penalty scored); Cantalapiedra (penalty missed); Gama (penalty scored); Gustavo (penalty scored); García (penalty scored)		(penalty scored) Oršić; (penalty scored) Silva; (penalty scored) Tanković; (penalty scored) Jajá; (penalty missed) Goldar; (penalty missed) Quina

=== UEFA Conference League ===
==== Second qualifying round ====
25 July 2024 First leg	Paksi FC (Hungary)	3–0	(Cyprus) AEK Larnaca	Paks
21:00 EET	Haraszti 17'; Vécsei (yellow card) 24'; Papp (yellow card) 44'; Tóth 61'; Ötvös 74'; Kinyik (yellow card) 90+2'	Report	Ledes (yellow card) 42'; Roberge (yellow card) 73'; Alomerović (yellow card) 74'	Stadium: Fehérvári úti Stadion; Attendance: 2,277; Referee: (Netherlands) Dennis Higler

1 August 2024 Second leg	AEK Larnaca (Cyprus)	0–2 (0–5 agg.)	(Hungary) Paksi FC	Larnaca
19:00 EET	Cabrera (yellow card) 19'; García (yellow card) 35'	Report	Haraszti 19'; Osváth (yellow card) 37'; Papp 42'; Vas (yellow card) 73'	Stadium: AEK Arena – Georgios Karapatakis; Attendance: 3,249; Referee: (Switzerland) Luca Cibelli
