= Enzo Cabrera =

Enzo Cabrera may refer to:

- Enzo Cabrera (footballer, born 1985), Chilean midfielder for Audax Italiano
- Enzo Cabrera (footballer, born 1999), Argentine forward for Newell's Old Boys
