= Yerson Chacón =

Venezuelan footballer (born 2003)

Personal information
- Full name: Yerson Ronaldo Chacón Ramírez
- Date of birth: 4 June 2003 (age 23)
- Place of birth: San Cristóbal, Táchira, Venezuela
- Height: 1.69 m (5 ft 7 in)
- Position: Forward

Team information
- Current team: AEK Larnaca
- Number: 18

Youth career
- Deportivo Táchira

Senior career*
| Years | Team | Apps | (Gls) |
| 2018–2025 | Deportivo Táchira | 115 | (21) |
| 2024–2025 | → AEK Larnaca (loan) | 30 | (4) |
| 2025– | AEK Larnaca | 5 | (3) |

International career^{‡}
| 2019 | Venezuela U16 | 1 | (0) |
| 2022– | Venezuela | 1 | (0) |
- * Club domestic league appearances and goals as of 8 September 2026 ‡ National team caps and goals as of 19:17, 30 January 2022 (UTC)

Yerson Ronaldo Chacón Ramírez (born 4 June 2003) is a Venezuelan footballer who plays as a forward for Cypriot club AEK Larnaca and the Venezuela national team.

== Club career ==
On 19 July 2024, Chacón moved on loan to AEK Larnaca in Cyprus, with an option to buy.

== International career ==
Chacón made his debut for the Venezuela national team on 28 January 2022 as an 85th-minute substitute for José Andrés Martínez in a 4–1 home win over Bolivia. He has played for the national under-16 squad as well as the Venezuela under-23 football team.

== Career statistics ==
=== Club ===
As of match played 28 September 2025

Appearances and goals by club, season and competition
| Club | Season | League | | | National cup (Note: Includes Copa Venezuela, Cypriot Cup) | | Continental | | Other | | Total | |
| Club | Season | Division | Apps | Goals | Apps | Goals | Apps | Goals | Apps | Goals | Apps | Goals |
|---|---|---|---|---|---|---|---|---|---|---|---|---|
| Deportivo Táchira | 2018 | Venezuelan Primera División | 1 | 0 | 0 | 0 | 0 | 0 | — | | 1 | 0 |
| Deportivo Táchira | 2020 | Venezuelan Primera División | 14 | 2 | — | | 0 | 0 | — | | 14 | 2 |
| Deportivo Táchira | 2021 | Venezuelan Primera División | 35 | 9 | — | | 7 (Note: Five appearances, one goal in Copa Libertadores, Two appearances in Copa Sudamericana) | 1 | — | | 42 | 10 |
| Deportivo Táchira | 2022 | Venezuelan Primera División | 25 | 3 | — | | 9 (Note: Five appearances, one goal in Copa Libertadores, Four goals in Copa Sudamericana) | 1 | — | | 34 | 4 |
| Deportivo Táchira | 2023 | Venezuelan Primera División | 28 | 5 | — | | 1 (Note: Appearance(s) in Copa Sudamericana) | 1 | — | | 29 | 6 |
| Deportivo Táchira | 2024 | Venezuelan Primera División | 12 | 2 | 1 | 0 | 5 (Note: Appearance(s) in Copa Libertadores) | 0 | — | | 18 | 2 |
| Deportivo Táchira | Total | | 115 | 21 | 1 | 0 | 22 | 3 | — | | 138 | 24 |
| AEK Larnaca (loan) | 2024-25 | Cypriot First Division | 30 | 4 | 5 | 0 | 0 | 0 | — | | 35 | 4 |
| AEK Larnaca | 2025-26 | Cypriot First Division | 3 | 1 | 0 | 0 | 8 | 2 | 0 | 0 | 11 | 3 |
| Career total | | | 148 | 26 | 6 | 0 | 30 | 5 | 0 | 0 | 184 | 31 |

== Honours ==
AEK Larnaca

- Cypriot Cup: 2024–25
