= Satsias =

Satsias is a surname. Notable people with the surname include:

- Giannis Satsias (born 2002), Cypriot footballer, son of Marinos
- Marinos Satsias (born 1978), Cypriot football manager and player
