= Giorgos Naoum =

Cypriot footballer (born 2001)

Personal information
- Date of birth: 21 February 2001 (age 25)
- Place of birth: Strovolos, Cyprus
- Height: 1.79 m (5 ft 10 in)
- Position: Attacking midfielder

Team information
- Current team: AEK Larnaca
- Number: 29

Youth career
- –2013: Antonis Naoum Football Academy
- 2013–2019: APOEL Nicosia
- 2019: → Padova (loan)
- 2019–2021: AEK Larnaca

Senior career*
Years	Team	Apps	(Gls)
2021–	AEK Larnaca	69	(1)

International career^{‡}
2017–2018	Cyprus U17	11	(1)
2021–2022	Cyprus U21	8	(1)
2026–	Cyprus	2	(0)
- * Club domestic league appearances and goals as of 14 June 2026 ‡ National team caps and goals as of 13:00, 7 June 2026 (UTC)

Giorgos Naoum (Greek: Γιώργος Ναούμ; born 21 April 2001) is a Cypriot professional footballer who plays as an attacking midfielder for Cypriot club AEK Larnaca and the Cyprus national team.

== Club career ==
=== Early career ===
Born in Strovolos, Cyprus, Naoum grew up in the Antonis Naoum Football Academy. He then joined APOEL Nicosia's youth sector on 12 September 2013, playing 152 games and scoring 10 goals in all competitions between the under-13s and under-19s.

On 28 February 2019, Naoum joined the primavera (under-19) team of Padova in Italy.

=== AEK Larnaca ===
He moved to Cypriot First Division club AEK Larnaca in on 29 September 2019; Naoum sustained an ACL injury in November, and was sidelined for six months. He played nine league games in the 2020–21 season. In May 2021, Naoum's contract was extended until summer 2024.

== International career ==
Naoum represented Cyprus at under-17 level, scoring a goal (against Denmark) in 11 games. He also played for the Cyprus under-21 team at the 2023 UEFA European Under-21 Championship qualification.

== Personal life ==
Naoum is of Lebanese descent, and is a Maronite Christian. He took part in mandatory military service for Cyprus while playing football.

== Career statistics ==
=== Club ===
As of match played 22 September 2025

Appearances and goals by club, season and competition
Club	Season	League			Cypriot Cup		Continental		Total	
Club	Season	Division	Apps	Goals	Apps	Goals	Apps	Goals	Apps	Goals
AEK Larnaca	2020–21	Cypriot First Division	9	0	0	0	—		9	0
AEK Larnaca	2021–22	Cypriot First Division	9	0	5	1	—		14	1
AEK Larnaca	2022–23	Cypriot First Division	20	0	0	0	7 (Note: Six appearances in UEFA Europa League; one appearance in UEFA Conference League)	0	27	0
AEK Larnaca	2023–24	Cypriot First Division	5	0	0	0	—		5	0
AEK Larnaca	2024–25	Cypriot First Division	8	1	0	0	1 (Note: Appearance in UEFA Conference League)	0	9	1
AEK Larnaca	2025–26	Cypriot First Division	0	0	0	0	0	0	0	0
AEK Larnaca	Total		51	1	5	1	8	0	64	2
Career total			51	1	5	1	8	0	64	2

== Honours ==
AEK Larnaca

- Cypriot Cup: 2024–25
