= Ángel García (footballer, born 1993) =

Spanish footballer

Personal information
- Full name: Ángel García Cabezali
- Date of birth: 3 February 1993 (age 33)
- Place of birth: Madrid, Spain
- Height: 1.85 m (6 ft 1 in)
- Position: Left-back

Team information
- Current team: APOEL
- Number: 14

Youth career
- 1998–2002: Bonanza
- 2002–2003: Rozal Madrid
- 2003–2013: Real Madrid

Senior career*
Years	Team	Apps	(Gls)
2012–2014	Real Madrid C	51	(4)
2014–2016	Valladolid B	61	(11)
2015–2018	Valladolid	26	(2)
2018	Cultural Leonesa	13	(1)
2019–2021	Wisła Płock	68	(1)
2021–2026	AEK Larnaca	117	(6)
2026–	APOEL	2	(0)
- * Club domestic league appearances and goals as of 19:16, 28 October 2026 (UTC)

Ángel García Cabezali (born 3 February 1993), known as Ángel, is a Spanish professional footballer who plays as a left-back for Cypriot First Division club APOEL.

== Club career ==
Born in Madrid, García joined Real Madrid's youth setup in 2003, after stints at Club Bonanza and Rozal Madrid CF. He made his senior debuts with the C-team in 2012, in Segunda División B.

On 7 August 2014, García moved to Real Valladolid, being assigned to the reserves also in the third division. On 9 September of the following year, he made his first team debut, starting in a 2–1 away loss against Real Oviedo, for the season's Copa del Rey.

García made his Segunda División debut on 11 October 2015, starting and scoring his team's second in a 3–2 home loss against the same opponent. On 8 June 2016, he was definitely promoted to the main squad, and renewed his contract until 2018.

On 4 January 2018, García moved to fellow second division team Cultural y Deportiva Leonesa.

On 30 December 2018, García signed with Polish club Wisła Płock.

From 2019 to 2021, Ángel García played for Wisła Płock in Poland, making 68 appearances and scoring 1 goal.

Between 2021 and 2026, he represented AEK Larnaca, where he made 117 appearances and scored 6 goals, establishing himself as one of the club's key players. During his time at the club, he also served as team captain, underlining his leadership and importance both on and off the pitch.

On 13 July 2026, APOEL announced the signing of García.

== Career statistics ==
As of match played 13 July 2026

Appearances and goals by club, season and competition
Club	Season	League			National cup (Note: Includes Copa del Rey, Polish Cup, Cypriot Cup)		Continental		Other		Total	
Club	Season	Division	Apps	Goals	Apps	Goals	Apps	Goals	Apps	Goals	Apps	Goals
Real Madrid C	2012–13	Segunda División B	19	1	—		—		—		19	1
Real Madrid C	2013–14	Segunda División B	32	3	—		—		—		32	3
Real Madrid C	Total		51	4	—		—		—		51	4
Real Valladolid B	2014–15	Segunda División B	37	7	—		—		—		37	7
Real Valladolid B	2015–16	Segunda División B	24	4	—		—		—		24	4
Real Valladolid B	Total		61	11	—		—		—		61	11
Real Valladolid	2015–16	Segunda División	3	1	1	0	—		—		4	1
Real Valladolid	2016–17	Segunda División	16	0	4	0	—		—		20	0
Real Valladolid	2017–18	Segunda División	7	1	3	0	—		—		10	1
Real Valladolid	Total		26	2	8	0	—		—		34	2
Cultural Leonesa	2017–18	Segunda División	13	1	—		—		—		13	1
Wisła Płock	2018–19	Ekstraklasa	16	0	—		—		—		16	0
Wisła Płock	2019–20	Ekstraklasa	24	1	1	0	—		—		25	1
Wisła Płock	2020–21	Ekstraklasa	28	0	1	0	—		—		29	0
Wisła Płock	Total		68	1	2	0	—		—		70	1
AEK Larnaca	2021–22	Cypriot First Division	22	1	3	0	—		—		25	1
AEK Larnaca	2022–23	Cypriot First Division	26	1	0	0	11 (Note: Two appearances in UEFA Champions League, seven appearances and one goal in UEFA Europa League, two appearances and one goal in UEFA Europa Conference League)	2	—		37	3
AEK Larnaca	2023–24	Cypriot First Division	29	2	1	1	3 (Note: Appearances in UEFA Conference League)	0	—		33	3
AEK Larnaca	2024–25	Cypriot First Division	24	1	4	0	2	0	—		30	1
AEK Larnaca	2025–26	Cypriot First Division	16	1	0	0	10 (Note: Six appearances and two goals in UEFA Europa League, four appearances in UEFA Conference League)	2	0	0	26	3
AEK Larnaca	Total		117	6	8	1	26	4	0	0	151	11
APOEL	2026–27	Cypriot First Division	0	0	0	0	—		—		0	0
Career total			336	25	18	1	26	4	0	0	380	30

== Honours ==
AEK Larnaca

- Cypriot Cup: 2024–25
