= Marcílio =

Marcílio or Marcilio is a Brazilian name which may refer to:

- Marcílio (footballer, born 1976), Brazilian footballer
- Marcílio (footballer, born 1995), Brazilian footballer
- Marcílio Marques Moreira (born 1931), Brazilian economist
- Marcílio Santos (born 1964), Brazilian footballer
