= 2024–25 Cypriot First Division =

Cypriot football league season

Cyprus League by Stoiximan
- Season: 2024–25
- Dates: 23 August 2024 – 18 May 2025
- Champions: Pafos (1st title)
- Relegated: Omonia 29M; Nea Salamis Famagusta; Karmiotissa
- UEFA Champions League: Pafos
- UEFA Europa League: AEK Larnaca
- UEFA Conference League: Aris Limassol; Omonia
- Matches: 240
- Goals: 637 (2.65 per match)
- Top goalscorer: Youssef El-Arabi (13 goals)
- Biggest home win: APOEL 7–0 Omonoia Aradippou (26 January 2025)
- Biggest away win: Omonia 29M 1–5 AEK Larnaca (1 December 2024)
- Highest scoring: APOEL 7–0 Omonoia Aradippou (26 January 2025); Aris 6–1 Ethnikos Achna (26 January 2025)
- Longest winning run: Pafos (6 matches)
- Longest unbeaten run: Pafos (14 matches)
- Longest winless run: Omonia 29M (10 matches)
- Longest losing run: Omonia 29M (5 matches)
- All statistics correct as of 11 June 2025.

The 2024–25 Cypriot First Division (known as Cyprus League by Stoiximan for sponsorship reasons), was the 86th season of the Cypriot top-level football league.

APOEL were the defending champions, having won their 29th title in the 2023–24 season. Pafos secured their 1st title as league champion at the conclusion of the Championship round.

== Stadiums and locations ==
Locations of the 2024–25 Cypriot First Division teams.

Team	Location	Stadium	Capacity
AEK Larnaca	Larnaca	AEK Arena	7,400
AEL Limassol	Limassol	Alphamega Stadium	10,700
Anorthosis Famagusta	Larnaca	Antonis Papadopoulos Stadium	10,230
APOEL	Nicosia	GSP Stadium	22,859
Apollon Limassol	Limassol	Alphamega Stadium	10,700
Aris Limassol	Limassol	Alphamega Stadium	10,700
Enosis Neon Paralimni	Paralimni	Paralimni Stadium	5,800
Ethnikos Achnas	Achna	Dasaki Stadium	7,000
Karmiotissa	Pano Polemidia	Ammochostos Stadium	5,500
Nea Salamis Famagusta	Larnaca	Ammochostos Stadium	5,500
Omonia Aradippou	Aradippou	Antonis Papadopoulos Stadium	10,230
Omonia Nicosia	Nicosia	GSP Stadium	22,859
Omonia 29M	Nicosia	Katokopia Stadium	3,500
Pafos	Paphos	Stelios Kyriakides Stadium	9,394

== Structure ==
14 teams will participate in the league. In the first round, known as Regular Season, all teams play each other home and away, for a total of 26 games each. In the second round, the league splits into two groups: Teams ranked 1–6 enter the Championship Playoffs, whereas teams ranked 7–14 enter the Relegation playoffs. The teams in the Championship Playoffs play each other home and away for an additional 10 games each, while the teams in the Relegation Playoffs play each other only once, either home or away, for an additional 7 games each. All criteria (such as points, goal difference, and head to head records) are retained during the transition from first to second round. The team ranked first in the Championship Playoffs are declared champions, while the bottom three teams in the Relegation Playoffs are relegated to the Second Division.

== Regular season ==
=== League table ===
Pos	Team	Pld	W	D	L	GF	GA	GD	Pts	Qualification or relegation
1	Pafos	26	20	2	4	50	12	+38	62	Qualification for the Championship round
2	Aris Limassol	26	18	7	1	53	15	+38	61	Qualification for the Championship round
3	AEK Larnaca	26	16	6	4	45	21	+24	54	Qualification for the Championship round
4	Omonia	26	16	4	6	53	26	+27	52	Qualification for the Championship round
5	APOEL	26	12	7	7	52	25	+27	43	Qualification for the Championship round
6	Apollon Limassol	26	11	7	8	28	23	+5	40	Qualification for the Championship round
7	Anorthosis Famagusta	26	10	7	9	34	33	+1	37	Qualification for the Relegation round
8	Ethnikos Achna	26	6	11	9	33	42	−9	29	Qualification for the Relegation round
9	Karmiotissa	26	7	6	13	26	51	−25	27	Qualification for the Relegation round
10	Omonia Aradippou	26	7	5	14	23	49	−26	26	Qualification for the Relegation round
11	AEL Limassol	26	6	6	14	26	46	−20	24	Qualification for the Relegation round
12	Enosis Neon Paralimni	26	5	4	17	18	41	−23	19	Qualification for the Relegation round
13	Nea Salamis Famagusta	26	4	5	17	22	52	−30	17	Qualification for the Relegation round
14	Omonia 29M	26	3	5	18	19	46	−27	14	Qualification for the Relegation round

Source: Soccerway
Rules for classification: 1) Points; 2) Head-to-head points; 3) Head-to-head goal difference; 4) Head-to-head goals scored; 5) Head-to-head away goals scored (only if two teams); 6) Goal difference; 7) Goals scored; 8) Play-off (only if deciding championship round, relegation round or relegation).

=== Results ===
Home \ Away	AEK	AEL	ANO	APO	APL	ARI	ENO	ETH	KAR	NEA	OAR	OMO	PAC	PAF
AEK Larnaca	—	2–0	1–0	2–1	4–0	2–0	4–1	2–2	2–0	2–0	1–0	0–3	2–0	0–2
AEL Limassol	1–1	—	0–1	1–2	0–1	0–3	2–1	5–2	4–0	0–0	1–0	0–4	1–1	1–3
Anorthosis Famagusta	2–2	1–0	—	2–2	1–2	0–3	3–2	2–1	1–2	3–1	3–0	1–0	2–0	0–2
APOEL	0–1	4–0	2–0	—	0–0	1–2	2–0	1–3	3–0	3–1	7–0	2–1	4–0	0–2
Apollon Limassol	1–2	3–0	2–0	0–0	—	1–1	3–1	2–2	3–0	1–1	1–0	1–1	2–0	0–1
Aris Limassol	1–1	4–0	3–0	3–0	0–0	—	2–1	6–1	1–1	2–1	2–0	2–0	1–0	1–0
Enosis Neon Paralimni	0–0	0–0	2–2	0–4	0–1	1–2	—	1–1	0–1	2–0	0–2	0–2	2–1	1–2
Ethnikos Achna	2–2	0–0	2–2	2–2	0–1	1–2	0–1	—	3–2	2–3	0–0	1–0	1–0	0–2
Karmiotissa	0–3	2–1	1–1	0–3	2–0	1–3	2–0	0–0	—	2–2	3–1	2–6	1–1	0–2
Nea Salamis Famagusta	1–3	0–2	0–4	1–1	1–0	2–2	1–0	0–3	2–1	—	2–3	2–3	0–1	0–2
Omonia Aradippou	2–0	2–2	0–0	0–5	0–1	0–3	2–0	2–2	1–1	1–0	—	3–5	1–0	0–2
Omonia	1–0	3–1	0–2	2–2	3–1	0–0	0–1	3–0	3–0	3–0	3–1	—	1–1	2–1
Omonia 29M	1–5	2–4	0–0	0–0	2–1	0–3	0–1	1–2	1–2	2–1	1–2	2–3	—	1–2
Pafos	0–1	4–0	3–1	2–1	1–0	1–1	2–0	0–0	4–0	4–0	4–0	0–1	2–1	—

Source: Soccerway
Legend: Blue = home team win; Yellow = draw; Red = away team win.

== Championship round ==
Pos	Team	Pld	W	D	L	GF	GA	GD	Pts	Qualification	PAF	ARI	OMO	AEK	APO	APL
1	Pafos (C)	36	26	4	6	67	21	+46	82	Qualification for the Champions League second qualifying round	—	4–0	3–1	2–0	0–1	2–0
2	Aris Limassol	36	22	9	5	66	31	+35	75	Qualification for the Conference League second qualifying round	0–1	—	3–3	1–0	1–0	2–1
3	Omonia	36	20	8	8	69	40	+29	68	Qualification for the Conference League second qualifying round	3–0	2–1	—	1–1	2–1	1–0
4	AEK Larnaca	36	19	11	6	58	30	+28	68	Qualification for the Europa League first qualifying round (Note: The winner of the 2024–25 Cypriot Cup (AEK Larnaca) qualified for the Europa League first qualifying round.)	2–2	1–1	1–1	—	3–0	3–0
5	APOEL	36	14	11	11	59	36	+23	53		1–1	2–1	1–1	0–1	—	1–1
6	Apollon Limassol	36	12	10	14	37	39	−2	46		1–2	2–3	3–1	1–1	0–0	—

Source: Soccerway
Legend: Blue = home team win; Yellow = draw; Red = away team win.
Rules for classification: 1) Points; 2) Head-to-head points; 3) Head-to-head goal difference; 4) Head-to-head goals scored; 5) Head-to-head away goals scored (only if two teams); 6) Goal difference; 7) Goals scored; 8) Play-off (only if deciding championship round, relegation round or relegation).
(C) Champions

== Relegation round ==
Pos	Team	Pld	W	D	L	GF	GA	GD	Pts	Relegation	ANO	ETH	AEL	ENO	OAR	KAR	NEA	PAC
1	Anorthosis Famagusta	33	15	7	11	50	42	+8	52		—	2–0	—	1–2	1–2	—	—	4–2
2	Ethnikos Achna	33	9	12	12	44	53	−9	39		—	—	2–0	—	—	2–1	1–1	3–1
3	AEL Limassol	33	11	6	16	38	53	−15	39		1–3	—	—	2–0	—	1–0	—	—
4	Enosis Neon Paralimni	33	10	5	18	31	48	−17	35		—	4–2	—	—	1–0	—	2–2	—
5	Omonia Aradippou	33	10	5	18	32	58	−26	35		—	2–1	1–2	—	—	—	0–2	4–1
6	Karmiotissa (R)	33	9	7	17	30	57	−27	34	Relegation to the Cypriot Second Division	0–1	—	—	0–2	1–0	—	—	2–0
7	Nea Salamis Famagusta (R)	33	6	8	19	31	62	−31	26	Relegation to the Cypriot Second Division	2–4	—	1–3	—	—	0–0	—	—
8	Omonia 29M (R)	33	3	5	25	23	65	−42	14	Relegation to the Cypriot Second Division	—	—	0–3	0–2	—	—	0–1	—

Source: Soccerway
Legend: Blue = home team win; Yellow = draw; Red = away team win.
Rules for classification: 1) Points; 2) Head-to-head points; 3) Head-to-head goal difference; 4) Head-to-head goals scored; 5) Head-to-head away goals scored (only if two teams); 6) Goal difference; 7) Goals scored; 8) Play-off (only if deciding championship round, relegation round or relegation).
(R) Relegated

== Season statistics ==
=== Top scorers ===
As of match played 18 May 2025

Rank	Player	Club	Goals
1	(Royal Moroccan Football Federation) Youssef El-Arabi	APOEL	13
2	(Argentine Football Association) Enzo Cabrera	AEK Larnaca	12
2	(Brazilian Football Confederation) Jairo	Pafos	12
2	(Polish Football Association) Mariusz Stępiński	Omonia	12
2	(Portuguese Football Federation) Rafael Lopes	Anorthosis Famagusta	12
3	(Argentine Football Association) Nicolás Andereggen	Ethnikos Achna	11
3	(Brazilian Football Confederation) Anderson Silva	Pafos	11
4	(Senegalese Football Federation) Yannick Gomis	Aris Limassol	10
4	(Russian Football Union) Aleksandr Kokorin	Aris Limassol	10
4	(Cyprus Football Association) Andreas Makris	AEL Limassol	10
4	(Royal Spanish Football Federation) Aitor Cantalapiedra	AEK Larnaca	10

=== Hat-tricks ===
Player	For	Against	Result	Date	Ref
(Cyprus Football Association) Andreas Makris	AEL Limassol	Ethnikos Achna	5–2 (H)	5 October 2024	
(Polish Football Association) Mariusz Stępiński	Omonia	Omonia Aradippou	3–5 (A)	10 November 2024	
(Royal Spanish Football Federation) Fran Sol	AEK Larnaca	Omonia 29M	1–5 (A)	1 December 2024	
(Polish Football Association) Karol Angielski	AEK Larnaca	Apollon Limassol	3–0 (H)	12 May 2025	

=== Clean sheets ===
As of match played 18 May 2025

Rank	Player	Club	Clean sheets
1	(Brazilian Football Confederation) Vaná	Aris Limassol	15
2	(Football Association of Slovenia) Vid Belec	APOEL	14
3	(Hellenic Football Federation) Georgios Athanasiadis	AEK Larnaca	13
3	(Croatian Football Federation) Ivica Ivušić	Pafos	13
5	(Football Association of Serbia) Živko Živković	Anorthosis Famagusta	11
6	(Brazilian Football Confederation) Fabiano	Omonia	10
7	(Nigeria Football Federation) Adebayo Adeleye	Enosis Neon Paralimni	9
8	(Georgian Football Federation) Giorgi Loria	Omonia Aradippou	7
8	(German Football Association) Philipp Kühn	Apollon Limassol	7
8	(Brazilian Football Confederation) Lucas Flores	Ethnikos Achna	7

== Attendances ==
#	Football club	Average attendance
1	Omonoia	7,875
2	APOEL	6,922
3	Pafos	5,292
4	Anorthosis	3,876
5	Apollon	3,335
6	AEK Larnaca	2,869
7	AEL Limassol	2,153
8	Aris Limassol	1,503
9	Omonoia Aradippou	1,444
10	Nea Salamina	1,094
11	Ethnikos Akhnas	918
12	Enosis Neon Paralimni	813
13	APK Karmiotissa	676
14	Omonoia 29M	259

== See also ==
- 2024–25 Cypriot Second Division
- 2024–25 Cypriot Cup
- 2024–25 Cypriot U19 Leagues
