= Luís Gustavo Ledes =

Portuguese footballer (born 1992)

Gus Ledes
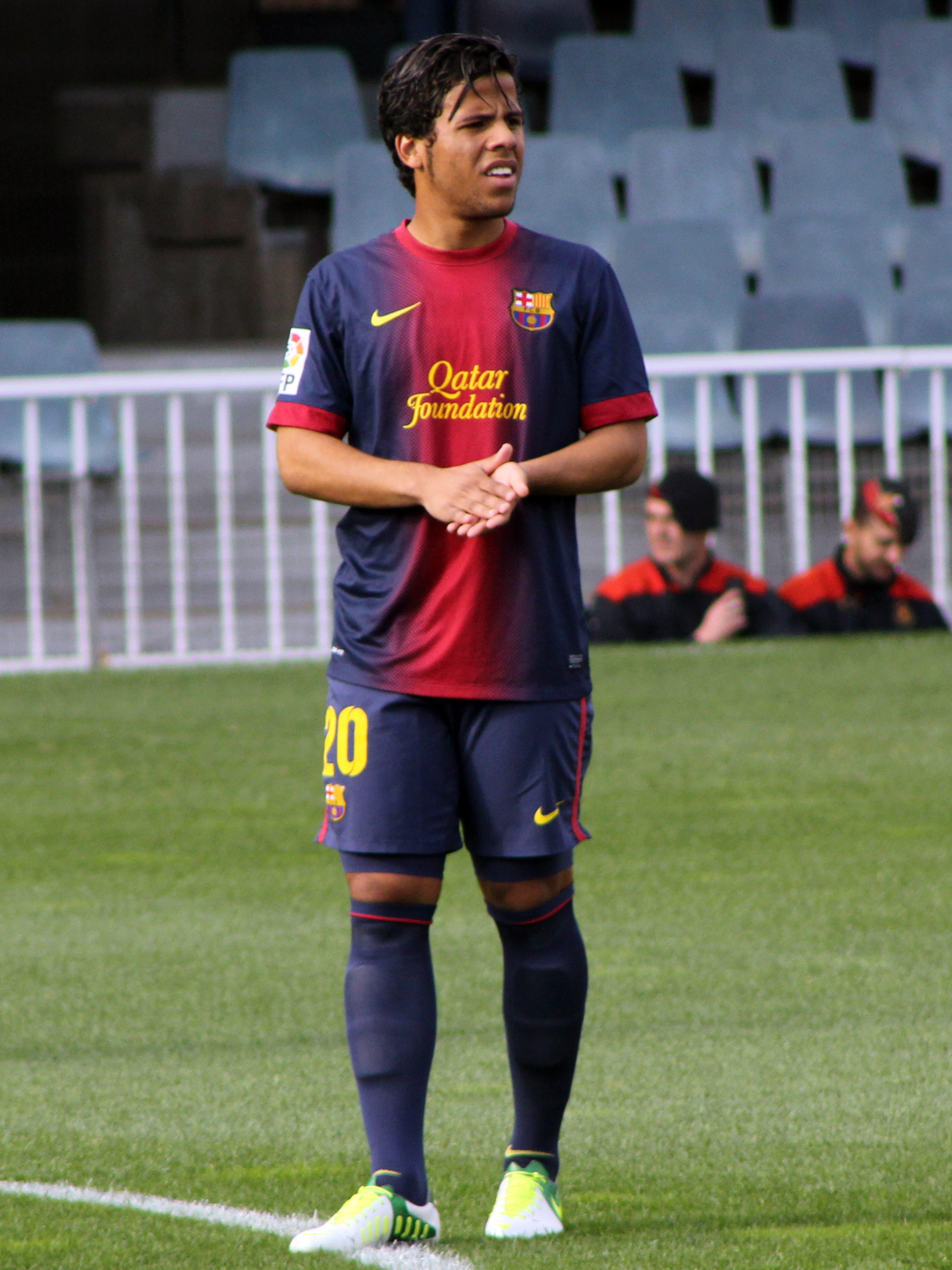
- Gustavo in action for Barcelona B in 2012

Personal information
- Full name: Luís Gustavo Ledes Evangelista dos Santos
- Date of birth: 28 September 1992 (age 34)
- Place of birth: Braga, Portugal
- Height: 1.73 m (5 ft 8 in)
- Position: Midfielder

Team information
- Current team: AEK Larnaca
- Number: 7

Youth career
- 2006–2011: Barcelona

Senior career*
Years	Team	Apps	(Gls)
2011–2013	Barcelona B	32	(1)
2013–2015	Rio Ave	22	(1)
2016–2017	Celta B	53	(3)
2017–2019	Reus	57	(8)
2019–2020	Numancia	50	(0)
2020–2021	Castellón	28	(1)
2021–	AEK Larnaca	152	(5)

International career
2008–2009	Portugal U17	14	(3)
2009–2010	Portugal U18	4	(1)
2010–2011	Portugal U19	9	(2)
2012	Portugal U20	5	(0)
2012–2014	Portugal U21	9	(0)
- * Club domestic league appearances and goals as of 22:47, 21 July 2026 (UTC)

Luís Gustavo "Gus" Ledes Evangelista dos Santos (born 28 September 1992), sometimes known as Luís Gustavo, is a Portuguese professional footballer who plays as a central midfielder for Cypriot First Division club AEK Larnaca.

== Club career ==
Born in Braga, Portugal, to Marcílio Santos, a Brazilian who played ten years in the country with five clubs, Ledes joined FC Barcelona's youth academy in 2006 at nearly 14. He was promoted to the B team five years later.

Ledes made his official debut for the side on 29 October 2011, in a 1–0 home win against Gimnàstic de Tarragona in the Segunda División. On 3 June 2012, in the season's last round, he scored his first professional goal, starting and contributing to a 6–0 away rout of Xerez CD.

On 30 May 2013, Ledes' contract expired and he was told by the Catalans that he would be released. He returned to Portugal on 11 July, signing a four-year deal with Rio Ave FC.

On 22 December 2015, having failed to appear in any competitive games in the first part of the campaign, Ledes joined RC Celta de Vigo, being assigned to the reserves. On 10 July 2017, he returned to the second division by agreeing to a contract with CF Reus Deportiu.

Ledes and the rest of the squad left halfway through 2018–19, after it was expelled by the Liga de Fútbol Profesional. On 30 January 2019, he joined CD Numancia until June 2021.

On 27 August 2020, after suffering relegation, Ledes signed a three-year deal with second-tier newcomers CD Castellón. He scored his only goal on 24 January 2021 to help the hosts defeat Sporting de Gijón 2–0, being eventually relegated.

Ledes moved to Cypriot First Division's AEK Larnaca FC on 30 June 2021, on a two-year contract. In December 2022, he and teammate Ádám Gyurcsó put pen to paper to one-year extensions.

== International career ==
Ledes won his first cap for Portugal at under-21 level on 14 November 2012, playing the second half of the 3–2 friendly victory over Scotland in Setúbal.

== Career statistics ==
As of match played 25 July 2026

Club	Season	League			National Cup		League Cup		Continental		Other		Total	
Club	Season	Division	Apps	Goals	Apps	Goals	Apps	Goals	Apps	Goals	Apps	Goals	Apps	Goals
Barcelona B	2011–12	Segunda División	8	1	—		—		—		—		8	1
Barcelona B	2012–13	Segunda División	24	0	—		—		—		—		24	0
Barcelona B	Total		32	1	—		—		—		—		32	1
Rio Ave	2013–14	Primeira Liga	12	1	2	0	3	0	—		—		17	1
Rio Ave	2014–15	Primeira Liga	9	0	2	0	6	0	2	0	—		19	0
Rio Ave	Total		21	0	4	0	9	0	2	0	—		36	1
Celta B	2015–16	Segunda División B	17	2	—		—		—		—		17	2
Celta B	2016–17	Segunda División B	38	1	—		—		—		—		38	1
Celta B	Total		55	3	—		—		—		—		55	3
Reus	2017–18	Segunda División	38	6	0	0	—		—		—		38	6
Reus	2018–19	Segunda División	19	2	1	0	—		—		—		38	1
Reus	Total		57	8	1	0	—		—		—		58	8
Numancia	2018–19	Segunda División	17	0	0	0	—		—		—		17	0
Numancia	2019–20	Segunda División	33	0	1	0	—		—		—		34	0
Numancia	Total		50	0	1	0	—		—		—		51	0
Castellón	2020–21	Segunda División	28	1	2	0	—		—		—		30	1
AEK Larnaca	2021–22	Cypriot First Division	30	2	3	0	—		—		—		33	2
AEK Larnaca	2022–23	Cypriot First Division	31	0	1	0	—		16	0	—		48	0
AEK Larnaca	2023–24	Cypriot First Division	32	2	2	0	—		3	0	—		37	2
AEK Larnaca	2024–25	Cypriot First Division	26	0	5	0	—		1	0	—		32	0
AEK Larnaca	2025–26	Cypriot First Division	33	1	1	0	—		16	0	—		50	1
AEK Larnaca	2026–27	Cypriot First Division	0	0	0	0	—		1	0	—		1	0
AEK Larnaca	Total		152	5	12	0	—		37	0	0	0	201	5
Career total			395	19	20	0	9	0	39	0	0	0	463	19

== Honours ==
AEK Larnaca

- Cypriot Cup: 2024–25
