= Xavi Roca =

Spanish footballer

Personal information
- Full name: Francesc Xavier Roca Mateo
- Date of birth: 19 January 1974 (age 52)
- Place of birth: Barcelona, Spain
- Height: 1.77 m (5 ft 10 in)
- Position: Right-back

Youth career
- 1990–1993: Barcelona

Senior career*
Years	Team	Apps	(Gls)
1993–1995	Barcelona C	63	(0)
1994–1997	Barcelona B	71	(0)
1996–1999	Barcelona	1	(0)
1997–1998	→ Logroñés (loan)	18	(0)
1998–1999	→ Toledo (loan)	25	(0)
1999–2002	Villarreal	81	(0)
2002–2003	Espanyol	1	(0)
2003–2004	Rayo Vallecano	3	(0)
2004–2006	Hospitalet	46	(0)
2006–2008	Sabadell	54	(0)
2008–2009	Auckland City	17	(0)
2009–2010	Europa	9	(0)
Total		389	(0)

International career
1989–1990	Spain U16	9	(0)
1990–1991	Spain U17	8	(0)
1990–1991	Spain U18	10	(0)
1995	Spain U21	1	(0)
- * Club domestic league appearances and goals

Francesc Xavier 'Xavi' Roca Mateo (born 19 January 1974) is a Spanish former professional footballer who played as a right-back.

== Club career ==
Born in Barcelona, Catalonia, Roca joined FC Barcelona's academy at 16. He spent three professional seasons as captain of their reserves in the Segunda División, and his input with the first team consisted of 90 minutes in La Liga in a 2–2 away draw against Deportivo de La Coruña on 26 May 1996; additionally, for two consecutive years, he was loaned to CD Logroñés and CD Toledo in the second division.

Released in summer 1999, Roca remained in the second tier with Villarreal CF. He was first-choice in his first season as the club returned to the top flight after one year, then totalled 50 games over the next two as they managed to stay afloat.

Roca signed a two-year contract with top-division RCD Espanyol on 24 May 2002. He left after only one and two competitive appearances, returning to division two with Rayo Vallecano on a three-year deal.

Before retiring at the age of 36, Roca competed in the lower leagues and his native region, with CE L'Hospitalet, CE Sabadell FC and CE Europa. He also spent one year in the New Zealand Football Championship with Auckland City FC, where he suffered a serious knee injury in his debut.

Subsequently, Roca worked as sporting director at Sabadell, AEK Larnaca FC (Cypriot First Division) and Panathinaikos FC (Super League Greece).
