= Karol Angielski =

Polish footballer (born 1996)

Personal information
- Full name: Karol Jerzy Angielski
- Date of birth: 20 March 1996 (age 30)
- Place of birth: Kielce, Poland
- Height: 1.81 m (5 ft 11 in)
- Position: Striker

Team information
- Current team: Nea Salamis Famagusta

Youth career
- –2012: Korona Kielce

Senior career*
Years	Team	Apps	(Gls)
2012–2014	Korona Kielce	8	(0)
2014–2015	Śląsk Wrocław	8	(0)
2015–2018	Piast Gliwice	49	(2)
2016	→ Zawisza Bydgoszcz (loan)	14	(2)
2016–2017	→ Olimpia Grudziądz (loan)	29	(14)
2018–2020	Wisła Płock	25	(2)
2020–2022	Radomiak Radom	64	(31)
2022–2023	Sivasspor	15	(0)
2023–2024	Atromitos	30	(9)
2024–2026	AEK Larnaca	33	(8)
2026	Pogoń Szczecin	11	(1)
2026–	Nea Salamis Famagusta	0	(0)

International career
2013	Poland U18	2	(2)
2013	Poland U19	2	(0)
2015–2017	Poland U20	8	(2)
- * Club domestic league appearances and goals as of 09:37, 30 May 2026 (UTC)

Karol Jerzy Angielski (born 20 March 1996) is a Polish professional footballer who plays as a striker for Cypriot First Division club Nea Salamis Famagusta.

== Career ==
On 4 August 2023, Angielski joined Atromitos on a one-year deal with an option for a further season.

On 13 August 2024, Cypriot club AEK Larnaca announced they had reached an agreement in principle to sign Angielski on a two-year contract. The move was confirmed on 16 August.

On 9 January 2026, two days after leaving AEK Larnaca by mutual consent, Angielski moved to Ekstraklasa club Pogoń Szczecin on a deal until June 2027.

On 31 August 2026, Angielski moved back to Cyprus and joined Nea Salamis Famagusta on a one-year contract.

== Career statistics ==
As of match played 18 April 2026

Appearances and goals by club, season and competition
Club	Season	League			National cup (Note: Includes Polish Cup, Turkish Cup, Greek Cup, Cypriot Cup)		Continental		Other		Total	
Club	Season	Division	Apps	Goals	Apps	Goals	Apps	Goals	Apps	Goals	Apps	Goals
Korona Kielce	2012–13	Ekstraklasa	5	0	0	0	—		—		5	0
Korona Kielce	2013–14	Ekstraklasa	3	0	0	0	—		—		3	0
Korona Kielce	Total		8	0	0	0	—		—		8	0
Śląsk Wrocław	2014–15	Ekstraklasa	8	0	0	0	—		—		8	0
Piast Gliwice	2015–16	Ekstraklasa	4	0	1	0	—		—		5	0
Piast Gliwice	2017–18	Ekstraklasa	24	2	1	0	—		—		25	2
Piast Gliwice	Total		28	2	2	0	—		—		30	2
Zawisza Bydgoszcz (loan)	2015–16	I liga	13	2	1	0	—		—		14	2
Olimpia Grudziądz (loan)	2016–17	I liga	29	14	1	0	—		—		30	14
Wisła Płock	2018–19	Ekstraklasa	17	2	3	2	—		—		20	4
Wisła Płock	2019–20	Ekstraklasa	8	0	1	0	—		—		9	0
Wisła Płock	Total		25	2	4	2	—		—		29	4
Radomiak Radom	2020–21	I liga	30	13	2	0	—		—		32	13
Radomiak Radom	2021–22	Ekstraklasa	34	18	1	0	—		—		35	18
Radomiak Radom	Total		64	31	3	0	—		—		67	31
Sivasspor	2022–23	Süper Lig	15	0	1	0	6 (Note: Appearances in UEFA Europa Conference League)	1	1 (Note: Appearance in Turkish Super Cup)	0	23	1
Atromitos	2023–24	Superleague Greece	30	9	3	2	—		—		33	11
AEK Larnaca	2024–25	Cypriot First Division	22	7	3	1	—		—		25	8
AEK Larnaca	2025–26	Cypriot First Division	11	1	0	0	11 (Note: Eight appearances and two goals in UEFA Europa League, one appearance in UEFA Conference League)	3	1 (Note: Appearance in Cypriot Super Cup)	1	23	5
AEK Larnaca	Total		33	8	3	1	11	3	1	1	48	13
Pogoń Szczecin	2025–26	Ekstraklasa	11	1	—		—		—		11	1
Career total			264	69	18	5	17	4	2	1	301	79

== Honours ==
Radomiak Radom

- I liga: 2020–21

AEK Larnaca

- Cypriot Cup: 2024–25
- Cypriot Super Cup: 2025
