= Alex Opoku Sarfo =

Ghanaian footballer (born 2004)

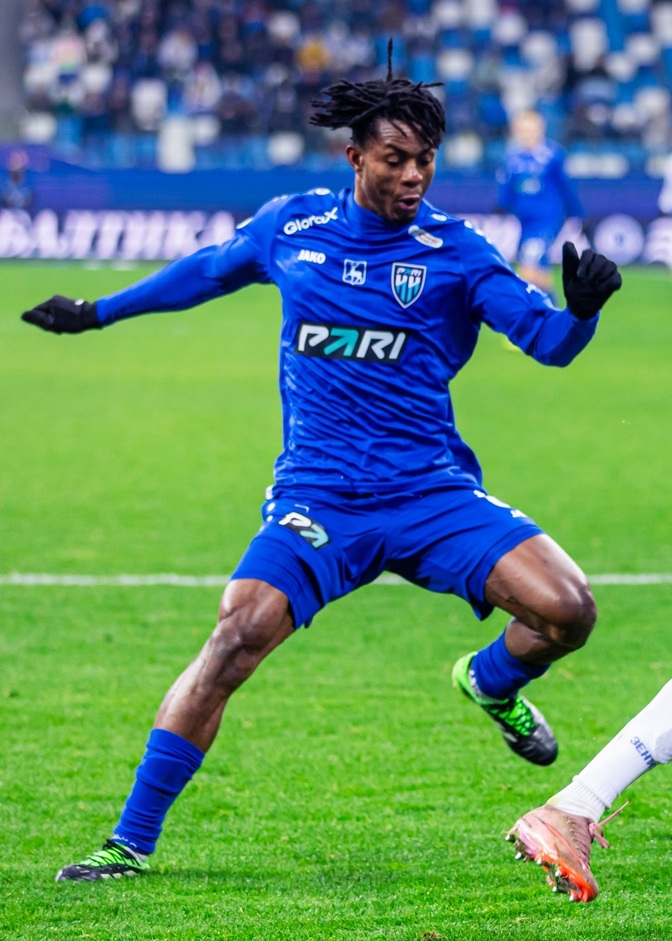
- Opoku Sarfo with Pari NN in 2025

Personal information
- Date of birth: 19 October 2004 (age 22)
- Place of birth: Accra, Ghana
- Height: 1.88 m (6 ft 2 in)
- Positions: Defensive midfielder; central midfielder

Team information
- Current team: Aris Limassol
- Number: 6

Senior career*
Years	Team	Apps	(Gls)
2022–2023	Benab FC		
2023–	Aris Limassol	33	(1)
2023–2024	→ AEZ Zakakiou (loan)	32	(0)
2025–2026	→ Pari Nizhny Novgorod (loan)	14	(0)

International career
2022	Ghana U20	4	(0)
2024	Ghana U23	2	(0)
- * Club domestic league appearances and goals as of 17 May 2026

Alex Opoku Sarfo (born 19 October 2004) is a Ghanaian football player who plays as a defensive midfielder or central midfielder for Cypriot club Aris Limassol.

== Club career ==
On 16 August 2023, Sarfo signed with AEZ Zakakiou on loan for the 2023–24 season. On 9 September 2024, he extended his contract with Aris Limassol until 2028. On 11 September 2025, Sarfo signed with Russian Premier League club Pari Nizhny Novgorod on loan for the 2025–26 season. He made his RPL debut for Nizhny Novgorod on 26 October 2025 in a game against Baltika Kaliningrad.

== Career statistics ==
As of match played 17 May 2026

Club	Season	League			Cup		Total	
Club	Season	Division	Apps	Goals	Apps	Goals	Apps	Goals
AEZ Zakakiou (loan)	2023–24	Cypriot First Division	32	0	3	0	35	0
Aris Limassol	2024–25	Cypriot First Division	33	1	1	0	34	1
Pari Nizhny Novgorod (loan)	2025–26	Russian Premier League	14	0	0	0	14	0
Career total			79	1	4	0	83	1
