= Godswill Ekpolo =

Nigerian footballer

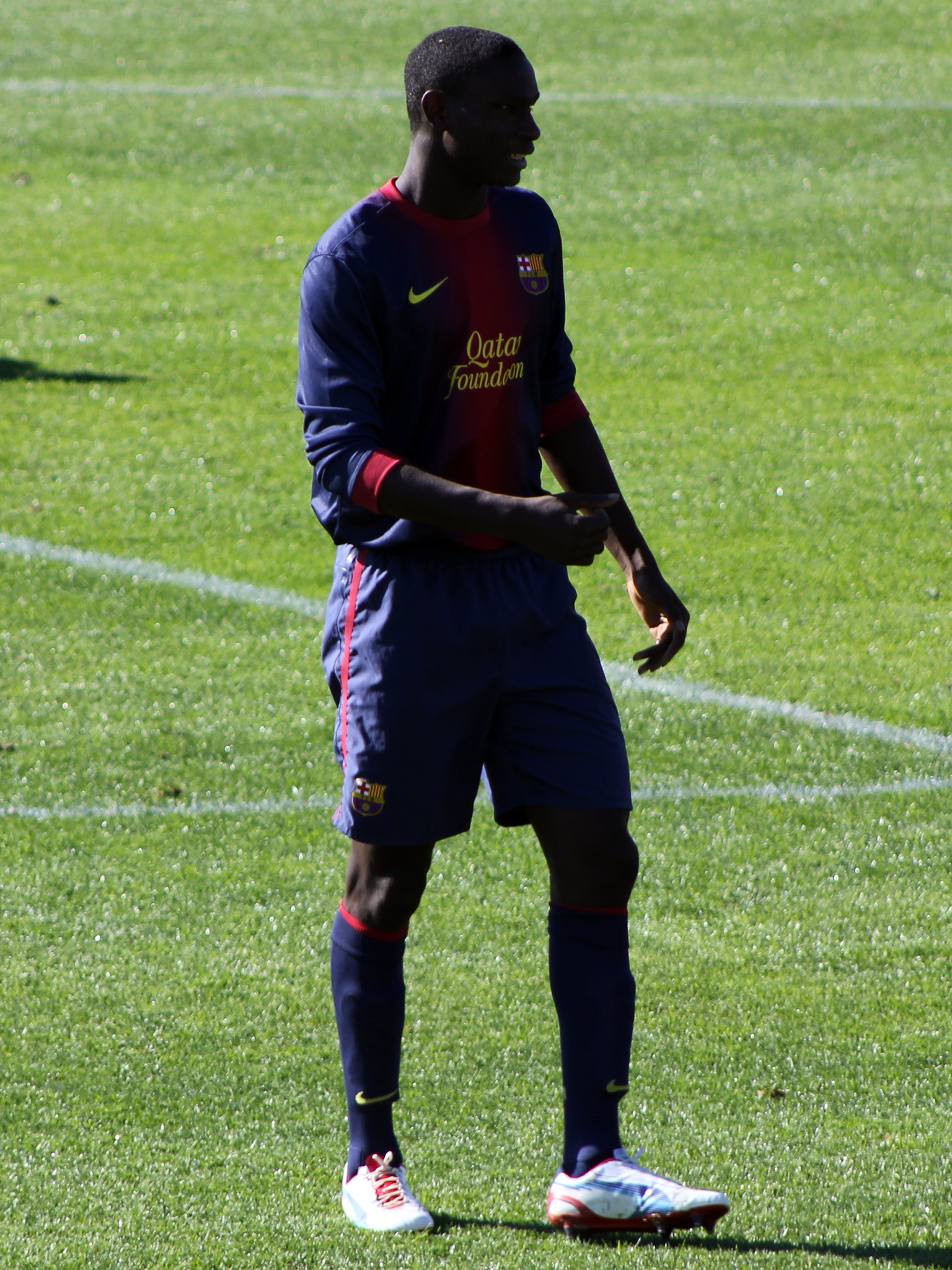
- Godswill Ekpolo in 2012

Personal information
- Full name: Elohor Godswill Ekpolo
- Date of birth: 14 May 1995 (age 31)
- Place of birth: Benin City, Nigeria
- Height: 1.81 m (5 ft 11 in)
- Position: Defender

Team information
- Current team: AEK Larnaca
- Number: 22

Youth career
- 2005–2014: Barcelona

Senior career*
Years	Team	Apps	(Gls)
2014–2016	Barcelona B	28	(0)
2016–2018	Fleetwood Town	9	(0)
2018	Mérida	8	(0)
2018–2021	Häcken	100	(4)
2022–2023	Norrköping	28	(0)
2023–2024	Apollon Limassol	45	(3)
2024–	AEK Larnaca	66	(2)

International career
- Nigeria U17
- * Club domestic league appearances and goals as of 14 June 2026

Elohor Godswill Ekpolo (born 14 May 1995) is a Nigerian professional footballer who plays for Cypriot First Division club AEK Larnaca. Mainly a right back, he can also play as a central defender.

== Playing career ==
Ekpolo moved with his family to Spain from Nigeria in 2002, and settled in Tarragona. He came through the youth team at FC Barcelona, and played for the reserve team and captained the under-21 team, before he was released in June 2016.

After a trial at Wolverhampton Wanderers in July 2016, he signed with English League One side Fleetwood Town on a contract of undisclosed length in November. He scored his first goal for Fleetwood in an EFL Trophy tie against Leicester City Under-23s on 29 August 2017.

Having been replaced at right-back by Everton loanee Gethin Jones, Ekpolo returned to Spain on 26 January 2018 and signed for Mérida AD of Segunda División B.

On 29 June 2018, Ekpolo signed a six-month deal with Swedish Allsvenskan side BK Häcken, and on 12 October it was extended to the end of 2021.

Ekpolo featured regularly for AEK Larnaca during the 2025–26 campaign in the Cypriot First Division. After the season ended, he spoke positively about his time in Cyprus and discussed the uncertainty surrounding the next stage of his professional career.

== Statistics ==
=== Club ===
As of 16 July 2017

Appearances and goals by club, season and competition
Club	Season	League			National Cup		Continental		Other		Total	
Club	Season	Division	Apps	Goals	Apps	Goals	Apps	Goals	Apps	Goals	Apps	Goals
FC Barcelona B	2015–16	Segunda División B	27	0	—		—		—		27	0
Fleetwood Town	2016–17	League One	6	0	1	0	—		—		7	0
Fleetwood Town	2017-18	League One	3	0	0	0	—		5 (Note: One appearance in EFL Cup, Four appearances in EFL Trophy)	1	8	1
Fleetwood Town	Total		9	0	1	0	—		5	1	15	1
Mérida	2017-18	Segunda División B	8	0	—		—		—		8	0
Häcken	2018	Allsvenskan	16	0	1	0	1 (Note: Appearance(s) in UEFA Europa League)	0	—		18	0
Häcken	2019	Allsvenskan	26	1	7	0	2	0	—		35	1
Häcken	2020	Allsvenskan	29	0	4	1	—		—		33	1
Häcken	2021	Allsvenskan	29	3	3	1	2 (Note: Appearance(s) in UEFA Europa Conference League)	0	—		34	4
Häcken	Total		100	4	15	2	5	0	—		120	6
Norrköping	2022	Allsvenskan	28	0	4	0	—		—		32	0
Apollon Limassol	2022-23	Cypriot First Division	13	1	—		0	0	—		13	1
Apollon Limassol	2023-24	Cypriot First Division	31	2	4	0	—		—		35	2
Apollon Limassol	Total		44	3	4	0	0	0	—		48	3
Career total			216	7	24	2	5	0	5	1	250	10

== Honours ==
Barcelona

- UEFA Youth League: 2013–14

AEK Larnaca

- Cypriot Cup: 2024–25
- Cypriot Supercup: 2025
