= Ivan Pankov =

Bulgarian footballer (born 2005)

Personal information
- Full name: Ivan Chavdarov Pankov
- Date of birth: 12 November 2005 (age 21)
- Place of birth: Sofia, Bulgaria
- Height: 1.82 m (6 ft 0 in)
- Position: Midfielder

Team information
- Current team: AEK Larnaca
- Number: 6

Youth career
- –2018: Enosi Neon Ypsona
- 2018–2021: Karmiotissa
- 2021–2023: Aris Limassol

Senior career*
Years	Team	Apps	(Gls)
2022–2024	Aris Limassol	1	(0)
2023–2024	→ Krasava Ypsona (loan)	24	(0)
2024–2026	Krasava Ypsona	57	(3)
2026–	AEK Larnaca	7	(0)

International career^{‡}
2026–	Bulgaria U21	2	(0)
2026–	Bulgaria	1	(0)
- * Club domestic league appearances and goals as of 13:43, 17 November 2026 (UTC) ‡ National team caps and goals as of 23:17, 13 November 2026 (UTC)

Ivan Pankov (Bulgarian: Иван Панков; born 12 November 2005) is a Bulgarian professional footballer who plays as a midfielder for AEK Larnaca and the Bulgaria national team.

== Career ==
Pankov started his youth career in Enosi Neon Ypsona, before moving to Karmiotissa. In 2021 he joined Aris Limassol. He made his league debut for Aris in January 2022 at the age of 16 years 2 months and 2 days, becoming the yongest ever debutant for Aris. In the summer of 2023 he moved on load to Krasava Ypsona for a season long deal. In the summer of 2024 his transfer was made permanent. He become champion of Cypriot Second Division and helped his team to make their historic promote to First Division. On 30 August 2025 he had a huge part of the first win in the Cypriot First Division for Krasava.

== International career ==
Born in Bulgaria, but raised in Cyprus, Pankov is eligible for both Bulgaria and Cyprus. In interview in 2023 he expressed his desire to represent Bulgaria. He received his first call-up for Bulgaria U21 in November 2025, for the 2027 UEFA EC Q match against Scotland U21 on 18 November 2025.

== Career statistics ==
=== Club ===
As of 28 May 2026

Club performance			League		Cup		Continental		Other		Total	
Club	League	Season	Apps	Goals	Apps	Goals	Apps	Goals	Apps	Goals	Apps	Goals
Aris Limassol	2021–22	Cypriot First Division	1	0	0	0	—		—		1	0
Aris Limassol	2022–23	Cypriot First Division	0	0	0	0	0	0	—		0	0
Aris Limassol	Total		1	0	0	0	0	0	—		1	0
Krasava Ypsona (loan)	2023–24	Cypriot Second Division	24	0	1	0	—		—		25	0
Krasava Ypsona	2024–25	Cypriot Second Division	26	1	1	0	—		—		27	1
Krasava Ypsona	2025–26	Cypriot First Division	31	2	1	0	—		—		32	2
Krasava Ypsona	Total		81	3	3	0	—		—		84	3
Career statistics			82	3	3	0	0	0	0	0	85	3
