= Enzo Cabrera (footballer, born 1985) =

Chilean footballer

Personal information
- Full name: Enzo Carlo Cabrera Borlando
- Date of birth: 1 April 1985 (age 41)
- Place of birth: Santiago, Chile
- Height: 1.78 m (5 ft 10 in)
- Position: Defender

Youth career
- Audax Italiano

Senior career*
Years	Team	Apps	(Gls)
2006–2014	Audax Italiano	113	(1)
2012	→ Everton (loan)	8	(0)
2013	→ Magallanes (loan)	9	(0)
- * Club domestic league appearances and goals as of 20 March 2020

Enzo Carlo Cabrera Borlando (born 1 April 1985) was a Chilean footballer.

He played several years for Audax Italiano.

== Honours ==
=== Player ===
Audax Italiano

- Primera División de Chile (1): Runner-up 2006 Clausura
