= Hrvoje Miličević =

Bosnian footballer

Personal information
- Full name: Hrvoje Miličević
- Date of birth: 20 April 1993 (age 33)
- Place of birth: Mostar, Bosnia and Herzegovina
- Height: 1.92 m (6 ft 4 in)
- Position: Centre-back

Team information
- Current team: AEK Larnaca
- Number: 15

Youth career
- –2010: Zrinjski Mostar

Senior career*
Years	Team	Apps	(Gls)
2010–2014	Zrinjski Mostar	74	(5)
2014–2018	Pescara	3	(0)
2015	→ Teramo (loan)	3	(0)
2015–2016	→ L'Aquila (loan)	17	(1)
2018–2019	Aktobe	39	(3)
2020–2021	Sarajevo	29	(1)
2021–	AEK Larnaca	163	(17)

International career^{‡}
2012	Croatia U19	7	(0)
2012–2013	Croatia U20	8	(0)
2013	Croatia U21	5	(0)
2022–2023	Bosnia and Herzegovina	8	(0)
- * Club domestic league appearances and goals as of 23 May 2026 ‡ National team caps and goals as of 11 September 2023 (UTC)

Hrvoje Miličević (born 20 April 1993) is a Bosnian professional footballer who plays as a centre-back for Cypriot First Division club AEK Larnaca.

== Club career ==
Miličević started his career at Bosnian Premier League club Zrinjski Mostar. He made his debut for Pescara on 2 April 2017, in a 1–1 tie against Milan. Miličević wasn't registered by Pescara for the first half of the 2017–18 season and had his contract mutually terminated at the end of January 2018.

After Pescara, he played for Kazakhstan Premier League club Aktobe and another Bosnian Premier League club, Sarajevo, signing a six-month contract with a possibility of a one-year extension with the Bosnian club on 24 January 2020. He made his official debut for Sarajevo in a 6–2 league win against Tuzla City on 22 February 2020. He won his first trophy with Sarajevo on 1 June 2020, the league title, though after the 2019–20 Bosnian Premier League season was ended abruptly due to the COVID-19 pandemic in Bosnia and Herzegovina and after which Sarajevo were by default crowned league champions for a second consecutive time. On 18 June 2020, Miličević extended his contract with Sarajevo until June 2021. On 21 February 2021, he again extended his contract with the club until June 2022. In June 2021, Miličević terminated his contract with Sarajevo and left the club.

== International career ==
Born in Bosnia and Herzegovina and of Croat descent, Miličević represented Croatia on various youth levels. He debuted for the Bosnia and Herzegovina national team in a 1–0 friendly loss to Georgia on 25 March 2022.

== Career statistics ==
=== Club ===
As of match played 26 May 2021.

Appearances and goals by club, season and competition
Club	Season	League			Cup		Continental		Total	
Club	Season	Division	Apps	Goals	Apps	Goals	Apps	Goals	Apps	Goals
Zrinjski Mostar	2010–11	Bosnian Premier League	9	1	–		1	0	10	1
Zrinjski Mostar	2011–12	Bosnian Premier League	24	2	–		–		24	2
Zrinjski Mostar	2012–13	Bosnian Premier League	24	1	4	0	–		28	1
Zrinjski Mostar	2013–14	Bosnian Premier League	17	1	–		2	0	19	1
Zrinjski Mostar	Total		74	5	4	0	3	0	81	5
Pescara	2013–14	Serie B	0	0	–		–		0	0
Teramo (loan)	2014–15	Lega Pro	3	0	–		–		3	0
L'Aquila (loan)	2015–16	Lega Pro	17	1	–		–		17	1
Pescara	2016–17	Serie A	3	0	0	0	–		3	0
Aktobe	2018	Kazakhstan Premier League	31	2	1	0	–		32	2
Aktobe	2019	Kazakhstan Premier League	8	1	1	1	–		9	2
Aktobe	Total		39	3	2	1	–		41	4
Sarajevo	2019–20	Bosnian Premier League	3	1	–		–		3	1
Sarajevo	2020–21	Bosnian Premier League	26	0	6	0	3	0	35	0
Sarajevo	Total		29	1	6	0	3	0	38	1
Career total			164	10	12	1	6	0	182	11

== Honours ==
Sarajevo

- Bosnian Premier League: 2019–20
- Bosnian Cup: 2020–21

AEK Larnaca

- Cypriot Cup: 2024–25
