= Marcílio Santos =

Brazilian footballer (born 1964)

Personal information
- Full name: Marcílio Luís Evangelista dos Santos
- Date of birth: 12 December 1964 (age 61)
- Place of birth: Santo André, Brazil
- Position: Forward

Youth career
- 1983: Vasco da Gama

Senior career*
Years	Team	Apps	(Gls)
1984	Brasília	11	(1)
1985	Vasco da Gama		
1986	Brasília	20	(5)
1987	Vasco da Gama		
1987–1991	Braga	118	(25)
1991–1992	Chaves	19	(0)
1992–1993	União Leiria	24	(4)
1993–1994	Peniche	31	(9)
1994–1997	Naval	80	(29)
1998	Gama		
1999	Guará		
2000	Dom Pedro		

Managerial career
- 2000: Dom Pedro
- * Club domestic league appearances and goals

Marcílio Luís Evangelista dos Santos (born 12 December 1964) is a Brazilian former professional footballer who played as a forward.

== Career ==
Born in Santo André, São Paulo, Santos started his senior career with Brasília Futebol Clube. He went on to play mostly in Portugal, amassing Primeira Liga totals of 137 matches and 25 goals at the service of S.C. Braga and G.D. Chaves, during five seasons.

Santos made his debut in the competition on 27 September 1987, playing the full 90 minutes in a 1–1 home draw against FC Porto.

== Personal life ==
Santos' son, Luís Gustavo, was also a professional footballer.
