= Zacharias Adoni =

Cypriot footballer (born 1999)

Personal information
- Full name: Zacharias Adoni
- Date of birth: 13 June 1999 (age 27)
- Place of birth: Paliometocho, Cyprus
- Height: 1.90 m (6 ft 3 in)
- Position: Centre-back

Team information
- Current team: AEK Larnaca
- Number: 27

Youth career
- APOEL

Senior career*
Years	Team	Apps	(Gls)
2017–2018	APOEL	0	(0)
2018–2021	Doxa Katokopias	36	(0)
2019–2020	→ ASIL Lysi (loan)	16	(1)
2021–2023	Ethnikos Achna	21	(0)
2022–2023	→ Nea Salamina (loan)	31	(2)
2023–2026	Apollon Limassol	33	(2)
2026–	AEK Larnaca	0	(0)

International career
2015	Cyprus U17	3	(0)
2017–2018	Cyprus U19	10	(0)
2018–2020	Cyprus U21	11	(0)
- * Club domestic league appearances and goals as of 09:26, 4 June 2026 (UTC)

Zacharias Adoni (Greek: Ζαχαρίας Άδωνη, born 13 June 1999) is a Cypriot professional footballer who plays as a centre-back for AEK Larnaca.

== Club career ==
Adoni made his Cypriot First Division debut for Doxa Katokopia on 3 March 2018, in a game against Olympiakos Nicosia.

On 28 June 2021, Adoni joined Ethnikos Achna on a free transfer.
