= Enzo Cabrera (footballer, born 1999) =

Argentine professional footballer

Personal information
- Full name: Enzo Daniel Cabrera
- Date of birth: 20 November 1999 (age 26)
- Place of birth: Casilda, Argentina
- Height: 1.75 m (5 ft 9 in)
- Positions: Forward; winger

Team information
- Current team: AEK Larnaca
- Number: 30

Youth career
- –2017: Newell's Old Boys

Senior career*
| Years | Team | Apps | (Gls) |
| 2017–2024 | Newell's Old Boys | 25 | (0) |
| 2021–2022 | → Intercity (loan) | 31 | (4) |
| 2022–2023 | → Birkirkara (loan) | 25 | (13) |
| 2023–2024 | → Ethnikos Achna (loan) | 37 | (18) |
| 2024– | AEK Larnaca | 46 | (20) |

International career^{‡}
| 2018 | Argentina U18 | 1 | (0) |
| 2021 | Argentina U23 | 1 | (0) |
- * Club domestic league appearances and goals as of 14 June 2026 ‡ National team caps and goals as of 29 March 2021

Enzo Daniel Cabrera (born 20 November 1999) is an Argentine professional footballer who plays as a forward for Cypriot club AEK Larnaca.

== Club career ==
Cabrera's career started with Newell's Old Boys. Juan Manuel Llop was the manager who promoted him into the club's first-team squad, selecting him in fixtures throughout the 2017–18 Argentine Primera División. His professional debut arrived on 16 September 2017, he was substituted on for the final twenty-seven minutes with the scoreline goalless; the match eventually ended in a 2–0 win, with Cabrera assisting both goals. Cabrera's first start came less than a month later versus Godoy Cruz, which was one of a total fourteen appearances for Newell's Old Boys in 2017–18.

In July 2021, Cabrera joined Spanish Segunda División RFEF club CF Intercity on a one-year loan deal. After returning from the spell in Spain, Cabrera signed a new loan deal on 5 August 2022 with Maltese side Birkirkara for one year.

On 1 July 2024, Cabrera signed a three-year contract with AEK Larnaca in Cyprus.

== International career ==
Cabrera has previously been selected to train with both the Argentina U20s and the senior team.

== Career statistics ==
As of 7 July 2025.

Club statistics
| Club | Season | League | | | Cup | | League Cup | | Continental | | Other | | Total | |
| Club | Season | Division | Apps | Goals | Apps | Goals | Apps | Goals | Apps | Goals | Apps | Goals | Apps | Goals |
|---|---|---|---|---|---|---|---|---|---|---|---|---|---|---|
| Newell's Old Boys | 2017–18 | Primera División | 13 | 0 | 2 | 0 | — | | — | | — | | 15 | 0 |
| Newell's Old Boys | 2018–19 | Primera División | 2 | 0 | 0 | 0 | 1 | 0 | — | | — | | 3 | 0 |
| Newell's Old Boys | 2019–20 | Primera División | 1 | 0 | 1 | 1 | 3 | 0 | — | | 4 | 0 | 9 | 1 |
| Newell's Old Boys | 2020–21 | Primera División | 4 | 0 | 0 | 0 | — | | 1 | 0 | — | | 5 | 0 |
| Newell's Old Boys | Total | | 20 | 0 | 3 | 1 | 4 | 0 | 1 | 0 | 4 | 0 | 32 | 1 |
| Intercity (loan) | 2021–22 | Segunda Federación | 31 | 4 | 0 | 0 | — | | — | | — | | 31 | 4 |
| Birkirkara (loan) | 2022–23 | Maltese Premier League | 25 | 13 | 5 | 4 | — | | — | | — | | 30 | 17 |
| Ethnikos Achna (loan) | 2023–24 | Cypriot First Division | 37 | 18 | 2 | 0 | — | | — | | — | | 39 | 18 |
| AEK Larnaca | 2024–25 | Cypriot First Division | 31 | 12 | 5 | 3 | — | | 2 | 0 | — | | 38 | 15 |
| Career total | | | 144 | 47 | 15 | 8 | 4 | 0 | 3 | 0 | 4 | 0 | 170 | 55 |

== Honours ==
Birkirkara

- Maltese FA Trophy: 2022–23

AEK Larnaca

- Cypriot Cup: 2024–25
