= Nicolás Andereggen =

Argentine footballer

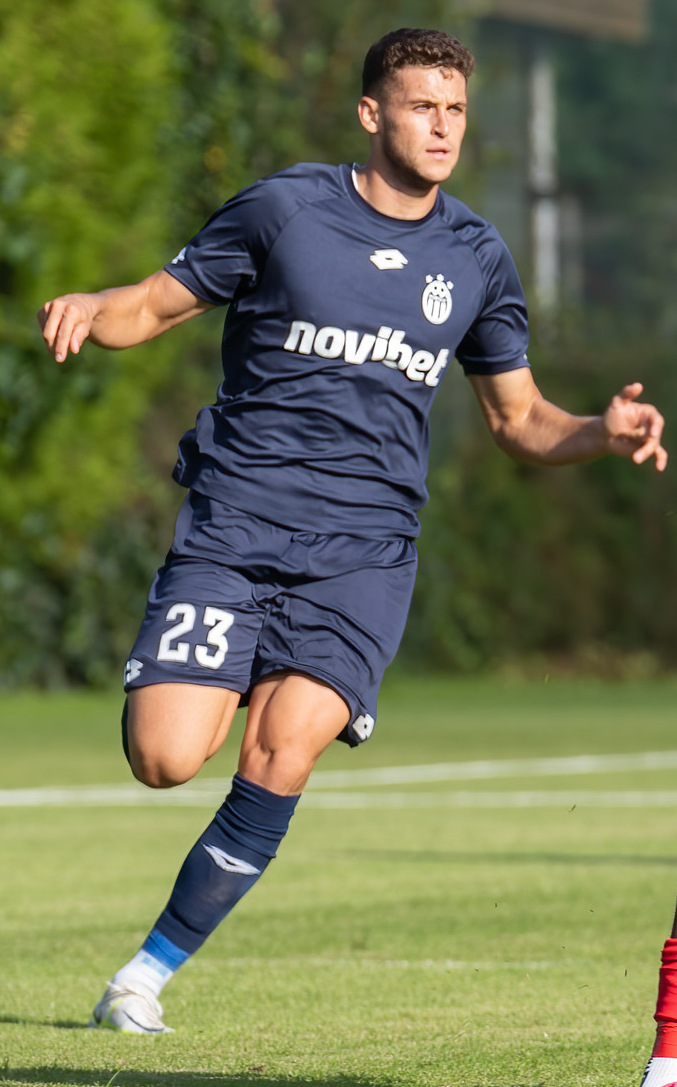

Personal information
- Date of birth: 22 August 1999 (age 27)
- Place of birth: San Jerónimo, Argentina
- Height: 1.76 m (5 ft 9 in)
- Position: Forward

Team information
- Current team: AEK Larnaca

Youth career
- Unión Santa Fe

Senior career*
| Years | Team | Apps | (Gls) |
| 2016–2022 | Unión Santa Fe | 22 | (0) |
| 2019 | → Zürich (loan) | 1 | (0) |
| 2019 | → Zürich U21 (loan) | 18 | (1) |
| 2020 | → Alvarado (loan) | 2 | (0) |
| 2021–2022 | → Ierapetra (loan) | 27 | (12) |
| 2022 | Ierapetra | 7 | (3) |
| 2023–2024 | A.E. Kifisia | 34 | (2) |
| 2024–2026 | Ethnikos Achna | 63 | (23) |
| 2026– | AEK Larnaca | 4 | (3) |
- * Club domestic league appearances and goals as of 21:40, 20 October 2026 (UTC)

Nicolás Andereggen (born 22 September 1999) is an Argentine professional footballer who plays as a forward for AEK Larnaca.

== Career ==
Andereggen got his debut for Union at the age of only 16 on 7 November 2015, which made him the youngest player ever to play in the Argentine Primera División at the time.

On 15 January 2019, Unión Santa Fe loaned out Andereggen to Swiss club FC Zürich until the end of 2019 with an option to sign him on a permanent deal. He spent majority of his loan with Zürich's Under-21 team which plays in the third-tier Swiss Promotion League.

== Personal life ==
Andereggen is of Swiss descent, and holds a Swiss passport.
