= Giannis Satsias =

Greek Cypriot footballer (born 2002)

Personal information
- Full name: Giannis Satsias
- Date of birth: 28 December 2002 (age 23)
- Place of birth: Nicosia, Cyprus
- Height: 1.76 m (5 ft 9 in)
- Position: Midfielder

Team information
- Current team: Panetolikos
- Number: 18

Youth career
- 2012–2020: APOEL

Senior career*
Years	Team	Apps	(Gls)
2020–2025	APOEL	98	(8)
2026–	Panetolikos	17	(0)

International career^{‡}
2018	Cyprus U17	3	(0)
2019	Cyprus U18	4	(0)
2020–2024	Cyprus U21	15	(3)
2023–	Cyprus	14	(1)
- * Club domestic league appearances and goals as of 13 September 2026 ‡ National team caps and goals as of 12:40, 7 June 2026 (UTC)

Giannis Satsias (Greek: Γιάννης Σατσιάς; born 28 December 2002) is a Cypriot professional footballer who plays as a midfielder for Greek Super League club Panetolikos and the Cyprus national team.

== Club career ==
Satsias made his professional debut for APOEL in the Cypriot First Division on 21 August 2020, coming on as a substitute in the 59th minute for Marius Lundemo in the home match against Karmiotissa, which finished as a 2–2 draw. He scored his first goal for APOEL in a game against Pafos making it 1–3 for APOEL.

== Personal life ==
His father is the former APOEL footballer Marinos Satsias.

== Career statistics ==
As of 14 June 2026

Club	Season	League			Cup		Continental		Other		Total	
Club	Season	Division	Apps	Goals	Apps	Goals	Apps	Goals	Apps	Goals	Apps	Goals
APOEL	2020–21	Cypriot First Division	1	1	3	0	—		—		20	1
APOEL	2021–22	Cypriot First Division	19	3	4	0	—		—		23	3
APOEL	2022–23	Cypriot First Division	19	2	1	0	2	0	—		22	2
APOEL	2023–24	Cypriot First Division	16	2	1	0	1	0	—		18	2
APOEL	2024–25	Cypriot First Division	19	0	1	0	6	0	—		26	0
APOEL	2025–26	Cypriot First Division	8	0	0	0	0	0	—		8	0
APOEL	Total		98	8	9	0	9	0	0	0	116	8
Panetolikos	2025–26	Super League Greece	13	0	1	0	—		—		14	0
Career total			111	8	10	0	9	0	0	0	130	8

== International goals ==
Scores and results list Cyprus's goal tally first.

No.	Date	Venue	Opponent	Score	Result	Competition
1.	11 June 2024	San Marino Stadium, Serravalle, San Marino	San Marino	1–0	4–1	Friendly

== Honours ==
APOEL

- Cypriot First Division: 2023–24
