= Aitor Cantalapiedra =

Spanish footballer (born 1996)

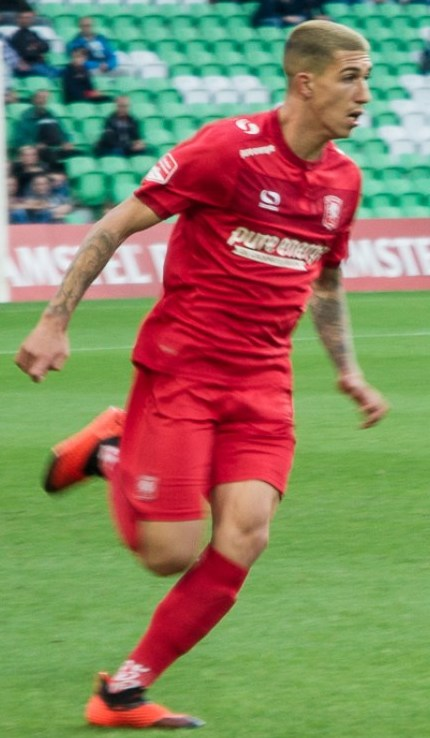
- Aitor playing for Twente in 2018

Personal information
- Full name: Aitor Cantalapiedra Fernández
- Date of birth: 10 February 1996 (age 30)
- Place of birth: Barcelona, Spain
- Height: 1.77 m (5 ft 9 1/2 in)
- Position: Winger

Team information
- Current team: OFI
- Number: 10

Youth career
- 2001–2002: Cinc Copes
- 2002–2006: Barcelona
- 2006–2009: Espanyol
- 2009–2010: Sant Andreu
- 2010–2012: Damm
- 2012–2014: Cornellà
- 2014–2015: Barcelona

Senior career*
Years	Team	Apps	(Gls)
2015–2016	Barcelona B	18	(4)
2015	Barcelona	0	(0)
2016–2017	Villarreal B	47	(2)
2016	Villarreal	1	(0)
2017–2018	Sevilla B	21	(1)
2018–2020	Twente	56	(20)
2020–2024	Panathinaikos	74	(21)
2024–2025	AEK Larnaca	30	(10)
2025–2026	Vitória	32	(4)
2026–	OFI	5	(0)
- * Club domestic league appearances and goals as of 20 September 2026

Aitor Cantalapiedra Fernández (born 10 February 1996) is a Spanish professional footballer who plays as a winger for Greek Super League club OFI.

He played for the reserve teams of Barcelona, Villarreal and Sevilla, while also playing for the first team in the Copa del Rey for his first club and in La Liga for the second. Abroad, he won the Dutch Eerste Divisie with Twente in 2019 and scored the only goal of the 2022 Greek Football Cup Final for Panathinaikos.

== Career ==
=== Barcelona ===
Born in Barcelona, Catalonia, Aitor joined FC Barcelona's youth school in 2002, aged six, after starting it out at PB Cinc Copes. Released in 2006, he spent his youth at three other teams in the region – RCD Espanyol, CF Damm and UE Cornellà – before joining Barça's youth ranks towards the end of the 2013–14 season.

After finishing his graduation, Aitor was promoted to the reserves in July 2015, after the club's relegation to Segunda División B. He made his senior debut on 22 August of that year, replacing Joan Campins for the final 21 minutes of a 1–2 loss at former club Cornellà.

Aitor scored his first senior goal on 5 September 2015, equalising in the 43rd minute against rivals RCD Espanyol B at the Ciutat Esportiva Dani Jarque, albeit in a 2–3 defeat. On 11 October, he scored the only goal in a home success over CD Alcoyano.

On 28 October 2015, Aitor made his first team debut, coming on as a 64th-minute substitute for fellow debutant Wilfrid Kaptoum in a 0–0 away draw against CF Villanovense, for the season's Copa del Rey. He played all 90 minutes in the return leg at the Camp Nou, which Barcelona won 6–1 and proceeded to the next round.

=== Villarreal and Sevilla ===
On 12 January 2016, despite being their top scorer with four goals as they fought a second successive relegation, Aitor's contract with Barcelona B was rescinded as part of a mid-season revolution; hours later he joined Villarreal CF, being again put into their B-team. He made his La Liga debut on 28 August, replacing Nicola Sansone for the final three minutes of a goalless draw at Sevilla FC.

On 7 August 2017, Aitor signed for another reserve team, Sevilla Atlético in Segunda División. He played exactly half of games as they finished the season in last place, only scoring in the 2–1 loss at Lorca FC on the final day.

=== Twente ===
Aitor moved abroad for the first time on 31 July 2018, signing a two-year deal for FC Twente of the Dutch Eerste Divisie. He scored 13 times in his first season in the Netherlands, as the team won promotion to the Eredivisie as champions with three games to spare, adding three more in the KNVB Cup. He netted seven goals in the 2019–20 top-flight campaign, which was voided due to the COVID-19 pandemic; this included two in a 3–1 home win over FC Utrecht on 1 September.

=== Panathinaikos ===
Aitor signed a three-year contract with Panathinaikos of Super League Greece on 24 June 2020. He scored his first goal for the club in a 2–0 home win against PAS Giannina F.C. on 12 December.

On 27 February 2022, Aitor scored in a 3–0 home win against AEK Athens in a local derby; he scored the only goal on 17 April in a win over Olympiacos F.C. in the Derby of the eternal enemies also at the Leoforos Alexandras Stadium. On 21 May, he repeated the feat from the penalty spot in the 2022 Greek Football Cup Final against PAOK.

Aitor scored eight goals and registered two assists in the first eight games of 2022–23 for the team from Athens. On 17 September he scored the first hat-trick of his career, with all the goals of a home win over Giannina; the first two came from direct free kicks and the last after a long dribble.

== Career statistics ==
=== Club ===
As of 26 January 2023

Club	Season	League			National cup (Note: Includes Copa del Rey, Greek Cup, KNVB Cup)		Europe		Total	
Club	Season	Division	Apps	Goals	Apps	Goals	Apps	Goals	Apps	Goals
Barcelona B	2015–16	Segunda División	18	4	—		—		18	4
Barcelona	2015–16	La Liga	0	0	2	0	—		2	0
Villarreal B	2015–16	Segunda División	14	0	—		—		14	0
Villarreal B	2016–17	Segunda División	33	2	—		—		33	2
Villarreal B	Total		47	2	—		—		47	2
Villarreal	2016–17	La Liga	1	0	0	0	—		1	0
Sevilla B	2017–18	Segunda División	21	1	—		—		21	1
Twente	2018–19	Eerste Divisie	35	13	4	3	—		39	16
Twente	2019–20	Eredivisie	21	7	1	1	—		22	8
Twente	Total		56	20	5	4	—		61	24
Panathinaikos	2020–21	Super League Greece	22	3	2	0	—		24	3
Panathinaikos	2021–22	Super League Greece	30	7	7	2	—		37	9
Panathinaikos	2022–23	Super League Greece	9	8	0	0	2 (Note: Appearances in UEFA Europa Conference League)	0	11	8
Panathinaikos	2023–24	Super League Greece	10	3	3	1	7 (Note: Two appearances in UEFA Champions League, five in UEFA Europa League)	0	20	4
Panathinaikos	Total		71	21	12	3	9		92	24
Career total			214	48	19	7	9	0	242	57

== Honours ==
Barcelona

- Copa del Rey: 2015–16

Twente

- Eerste Divisie: 2018–19

Panathinaikos

- Greek Cup: 2021–22, 2023–24

AEK Larnaca

- Cypriot Cup: 2024–25

OFI

- Greek Super Cup: 2026

Individual

- Super League Greece Player of the Month: September 2022
