= Adebayo Adeleye =

Nigerian footballer (born 2000)

Personal information
- Date of birth: 17 May 2000 (age 26)
- Place of birth: Warri, Nigeria
- Height: 1.80 m (5 ft 11 in)
- Position: Goalkeeper

Team information
- Current team: Zakynthos
- Number: 24

Youth career
- –2018: B-United Football Academy
- 2018–2019: Hapoel Jerusalem

Senior career*
Years	Team	Apps	(Gls)
2019–2020	Hapoel Katamon	33	(0)
2020–2024	Hapoel Jerusalem	103	(0)
2024–2025	Enosis Neon Paralimni	30	(0)
2025–2026	Volos	0	(0)
2026	Enosis Neon Paralimni	7	(0)
2026–	Zakynthos	1	(0)

International career^{‡}
2017	Nigeria U17		
2018	Nigeria U20		
2023–	Nigeria	2	(0)
- * Club domestic league appearances and goals as of 6 September 2026 ‡ National team caps and goals as of 09:08, 31 March 2026 (UTC)

Adebayo Adeleye (born 17 May 2000) is a Nigerian professional footballer who plays as a goalkeeper for Super League Greece 2 club Zakynthos and the Nigeria national team.

== Club career ==
Adebayo Adeleye joined 2018 from the B-United Football Academy in the Alimosho Local Government Area of Lagos State, to Hapoel Katamon after failing to play in the Nigeria Premier League.

In August 2019, Adeleye made his senior debut for Hapoel Jerusalem in a match against Hapoel Rishon LeZion. The following season, he helped his club to promotion to the Israeli Premier League with 19 clean sheets after they finished as runners-up in the Liga Leumit. Following promotion, he made his professional debut in August 2021, keeping a clean sheet in a 0–0 draw with Hapoel Nof HaGalil.

On 2 July 2024 signed for the Cypriot First Division club Enosis Neon Paralimni.

== International career ==
Adeleye was part of the Nigeria U17 in 2017 and 2018 of the Nigeria national under-20 football team. In June 2022, he received his first call-up to the senior squad. On 18 June 2023, he made his senior international debut in a 3–2 win over Sierra Leone.
