= AEK Larnaca FC =

Association football club in Cyprus

AEK Larnaca
- Full name: Αθλητική Ένωση Κιτίον Λάρνακας; Athletic Union Kition of Larnaca
- Nickname: Κιτρινοπράσινοι (The Yellow-greens)- Larnaca Guardians
- Short name: AEK
- Founded: 18 July 1994; 32 years ago
- Ground: AEK Arena – Georgios Karapatakis; Larnaca, Cyprus
- Capacity: 8,058
- Chairman: Andreas Karapatakis
- Manager: Rubén Sellés
- League: First Division
- 2025–26: First Division, 2nd of 14
- Website: www.aek.com.cy
Home colours	Away colours

AEK Larnaca FC (Greek: AEK; for short Αθλητική Έvωση Κίτιον Λάρνακας, romanized: Athletiki Enosi Kition Larnakas, "Athletic Union Kition of Larnaca") is a Cypriot professional football club based in Larnaca. The club was formed in 1994 after a merger of two historical Larnaca clubs, EPA Larnaca and Pezoporikos. The club also has a men's basketball team, a women's volleyball team and a men's futsal team.

The club's name comes from the ancient Greek city of Cyprus, Kition, which was located on the site of today's Larnaca. The colours of the club are yellow and green, and their emblem is admiral Kimon, who died at the seafront while defending the city of Kition circa 450 BC, in a fight against the Persians. He had told his officers to keep the news of his possible death secret. The quote "Και Νεκρος Ενικα" ("Even in death he was victorious") refers to Kimon.

The club's key milestones - beside being runner-up for the league 6 times - are qualifying to the 2011–12 and 2022–23 UEFA Europa League group stages, winning the Cypriot Cup in 2004, 2018 and 2025, its Champions League debut in 2022, and becoming the second Cypriot club to make the Round of 16 of a European competition, and the first to do so in the Europa Conference League.

== History ==
=== Foundation ===
AEK was founded on 18 July 1994. It came from the merger of two historic Larnaca clubs, EPA Larnaca and Pezoporikos.

==== EPA and Pezoporikos ====
Pezoporikos had been established in 1924. In 1926, serving retired members of Pezoporikos founded AMOL (stands for "Athletic Educational Union of Larnaca" in Greek). In 1932, the two clubs were merged, creating EPA Larnaca (EPA stands for "Union of Pezoporikos-AMOL" in Greek). However, in 1937 a group of members and players of EPA left and refounded Pezoporikos. After several decades, in 1994, the two clubs were merged and created AEK Larnaca.

EPA had 50 participations in the first division, won the championship three times (1945, 1946, 1970), the Cypriot Cup on five occasions (1945, 1946, 1950, 1953, 1955), and in one instance won the Super Cup (1955). In addition, during the season 1970–71, EPA participated in the Alpha Ethniki of Greece. They also had three appearances in European competitions.

Pezoporikos had 49 participations in the first division, won two championships (1954, 1988) and one Cypriot Cup (1970). They also had three appearances in European competitions.

Apart from football, the two clubs had other athletic departments. The decision to merge was made, in order to create a sports club in Larnaca which could star in all competitions (football, basketball, volleyball, etc.) without financial problems.

=== 1994–1999: The early years ===
After the merger of Pezoporikos and EPA, AEK replaced Pezoporikos in the first division (EPA had been relegated in the last season of its existence). In its first participation in the championship, in the 1994–95 season, AEK finished in 9th place. In the 1995–96 season, they finished 4th. AEK and APOEL were tied for the best defense in the league with 21 conceded goals. In the 1995–96 Cypriot Cup, the club reached the final, where they lost to APOEL.

However, because APOEL had won the championship and participated in the 1996–97 UEFA Cup, the finalists of the Cypriot Cup, AEK represented Cyprus in the 1996–97 UEFA Cup Winners' Cup. In the preliminary round, AEK faced the Armenian club Kotayk Abovyan. The first match took place in Armenia (8 August 1996), where AEK lost 1–0. The second leg was held at the New GSZ Stadium on 22 August 1996 with AEK winning 5–0 and progressing to the first round of the tournament. In this round, AEK were drawn to face Barcelona. The first leg (12 September 1996) was held at the Barcelona Olympic Stadium, where the Spanish team won 2–0. The second leg took place at the GSZ Stadium (26 September 1996) and ended in a 0–0 draw, meaning Barcelona had qualified. They would go on to reach the final and win the competition.

Before the beginning of the 1996–97 season, AEK, as runners-up of the Cypriot Cup, played against the league winners for the Super Cup, losing 1–0. In the 1996–97 season, AEK finished in 4th place and reached the semi-finals of the domestic cup. This was followed by 5th place in 1997–98, before returning to 4th place in the 1998–99 season.

=== 2000s ===
For three seasons in a row, 1999–00, 2000–01 and 2001–02, AEK finished in 7th place. In the 1999–00 season they reached the Cypriot Cup semi-finals, and in the 2002–03 season they finished in 8th place.

The 2003–04 season was very important for the history of the team, as they managed to win their first trophy. Although they finished 9th in the league, they reached the final of the Cup, where they beat AEL Limassol at the GSP stadium with a score of 2–1. Winning the cup gave AEK the opportunity to participate European football for the second time, in the 2004–05 UEFA Cup, where they faced Maccabi Petah Tikva in the second qualifying round of the competition. The first match took place on 12 August 2004 at the GSP stadium where AEK won 3–0. However, in the rematch in Israel, AEK lost 4–0 and was eliminated from the tournament.

In 2004, as cup winners, AEK faced league champions APOEL for the Cypriot Super Cup. AEK lost 5–4 after extra time. In the 2004–05 season AEK finished in 9th place, just three points clear of relegation. The following season they finished 8th. In the 2005–06 Cypriot Cup, AEK reached the final against APOEL. The final took place at AEK's home ground, the GSZ Stadium, however, they failed to win the trophy, being defeated 3–2 after extra time.

In the 2006–07 season, AEK finished in 7th place and reached the semi-finals of the 2006–07 Cypriot Cup. In the 2007–08 season, AEK finished 4th in the league. AEK's worst league finish came in the 2008–09 season where they placed 13th and were relegated to the Second Division, for the first time in the club's history.

=== 2010s ===
In the 2009–10 season, AEK finished 2nd in the Second Division, and were promoted back to the First Division. The following season, AEK finished in 4th place, allowing them to participate in the 2011–12 UEFA Europa League.

In the 2011–12 season, the club finished 5th and reached the semi-finals of the Cypriot Cup. In the 2012–13 season, AEK finished 4th in the league and made it to the semi-finals of the cup once more. In the 2013–14 season, the team placed 8th after a mediocre campaign.

==== UEFA Europa League 2011–2012 Group Stages ====
The participation of the team in the 2011–12 Europa League was historic for both the club and for Cypriot football. AEK Larnaca became the first Cypriot team to qualify to the group stage of the Europa League (Anorthosis and APOEL had previously qualified to the Champions League groups stage). In the second qualifying round, AEK faced Maltese Floriana who they beat 8–0 away and 1–0 at home. Their away win is the largest winning range of a Cypriot team in any European competition. In the third qualifying round, AEK faced the Czech Mladá Boleslav. In the first match, AEK won 3–0 at home, while in the second leg the teams were drawn by 2–2 with AEK qualifying to the play-offs of the Europa League. Their next opponent was the Norwegian Rosenborg. A goalless draw was the result of the first leg between the two teams. In the second leg (which was held at the Antonis Papadopoulos Stadium due to the fact that UEFA deemed the GSZ Stadium inappropriate for that phase of the tournament), AEK won 2–1 and qualified through to the group stages of the tournament.

In the group stage, the team faced Schalke 04, Maccabi Haifa and Steaua Bucharest. The only stadium in Cyprus which could host matches of group stages of European competitions was the GSP Stadium, where AEK played its home matches in the group stage. AEK finished at the bottom of Group J and was eliminated. AEK finished the group with one win (2–1 at home against Maccabi Haifa) and two draws (0–0 away against Schalke 04 and 1–1 home against Steaua), gathering five points. During that season, AEK set a new unbeaten record for Cypriot clubs in Europe, at six matches (four wins and two draws during the qualifying phase of the tournament). The same record is also hold by APOEL in the same season, but with three wins and three draws.

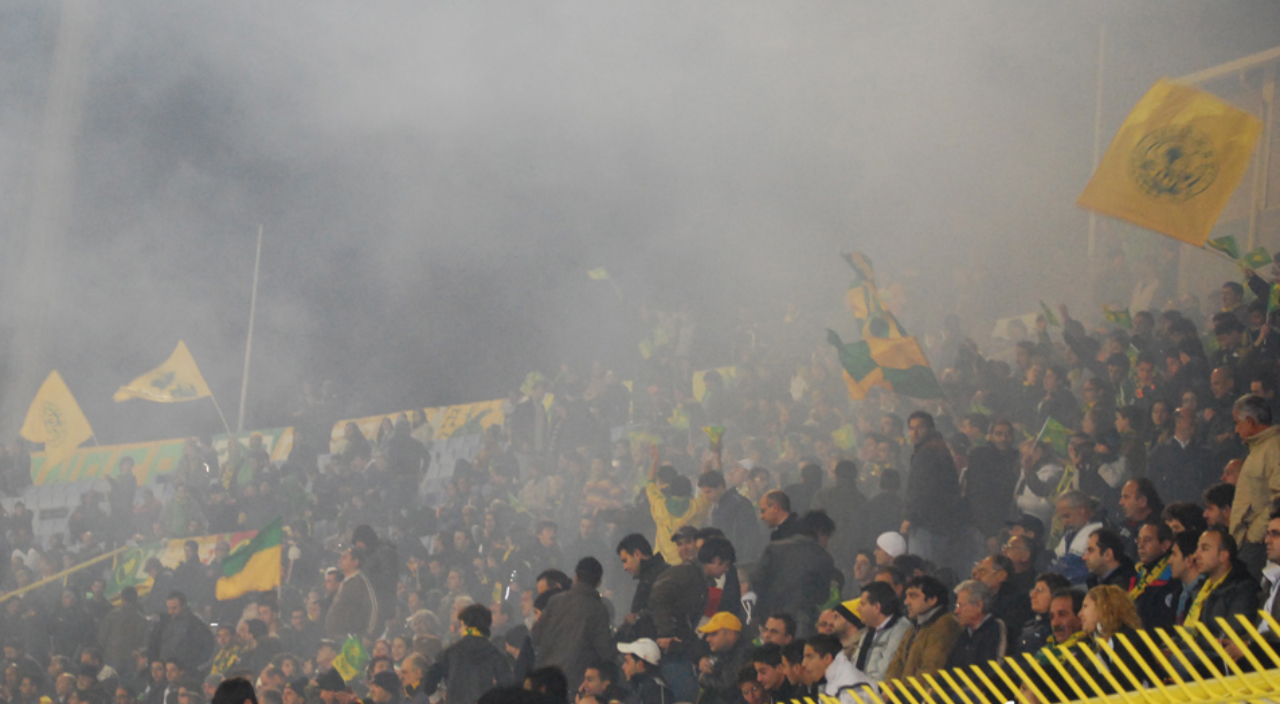
AEK Larnaca Fans at the GSZ Stadium

==== Spanish Larnaca ====
In 2014, the arrival of sporting director Xavi Roca marked the beginning of a Spanish era at AEK Larnaca. Under the coach Thomas Christiansen, there were six regular starters from Spain in the lineup during the 2014–15 season. That season, the team challenged for the championship trophy until the last matchday. In the penultimate matchday, the team faced APOEL with whom they drew 1–1. If AEK had won, they would go to the top of the table. In the last matchday, AEK beat Anorthosis and finished 2nd for first time in its history.

As in 2014–15, Larnaca finished in 2nd place in the League for the 2015–16 season. As it was the case in the previous season, there were six Spaniards in the starting eleven, but this time just one player from Cyprus.

Christiansen then left to League rivals APOEL Nicosia. He was replaced by a Spaniard, Imanol Idiakez. Under Idiakez, Larnaca finished second once again in the 2016–17 season. The team's highest scorers in the league were Ivan Trickovski with 14 goals, followed by the Spaniard Acorán Barrera who netted 9 goals. Idiakez nominated seven Spaniards as regular starters, but not a single player from Cyprus. The 2017–18 season saw AEK Larnaca finishing in 4th place but winning the Cyprus Cup for the second time. The French striker Florian Taulemesse scored a staggering 22 goals in the championship and was nominated player of the year and player of the Cyprus Cup Final for the season. Imanol Idiakez completed 100 games as AEK Larnaca coach, and in his final game he won the Cypriot Cup.

=== 2020s ===
Led by David Catala, and interim coach David Badia towards the end of the season, AEK Larnaca finished 2nd in the 2021–22 campaign. Cyprus' ranking in the UEFA coefficients at the time, meant that AEK had qualified for Champions League football, for the first time in the club's history. Spaniard José Luis Oltra was brought in as the new coach for the 2022–23 season.

AEK made its Champions League debut in a qualifying round against Midtjylland on 19 July 2022. They were eliminated on penalties following two consecutive draws, and dropped into the qualifying rounds of the Europa League where they knocked-out FK Partizan and SC Dnipro-1, entering the Europa League group stage for the third time in the club's history.

AEK finished third in Group B of the 2022–23 Europa League, and secured its place in the preliminary knockout round of the Europa Conference League, where they would go on to eliminate SC Dnipro-1 to enter the round of 16. This made AEK the second Cypriot club to "survive" a European group stage, and make it to the round of 16 of any European Competition, and the first and only Cypriot club to make the round of 16 of the Europa Conference League. They were eliminated by eventual winners West Ham United. AEK finished their league campaign in 3rd place. They gained entry into the Europa Conference League qualifying rounds, but failed to make the group stage.

== Stadium ==
Since October 2016, AEK Larnaca's home ground is the AEK Arena which opened its doors hosting the very first match of AEK Larnaka against Aris Limassol.

The previous home stadium of the football team was the New GSZ Stadium, which was commonly used by EPA and Pezoporikos. Before the construction of the stadium, the two teams used old GSZ stadium.

== Honours ==
=== Domestic ===
- Cypriot First Division:
  - Winners (5): 1944–45, 1945–46, 1953–54, 1969–70, 1987–88
  - Runners-up (19): 1938–39, 1939–40, 1946–47, 1949–50, 1951–52, 1952–53, 1954–55, 1956–57, 1957–58, 1969–70, 1971–72, 1973–74, 1981–82, 2014–15, 2015–16, 2016–17, 2018–19, 2021–22, 2023–24, 2025–26
- Cypriot Second Division:
  - Winners (1): 1989–90
- Cypriot Cup:
  - Winners (9): 1944–45, 1945–46, 1949–50, 1952–53, 1954–55, 1969–70, 2003–04, 2017–18, 2024–25
  - Runners-up (12): 1939–40, 1950–51, 1951–52, 1953–54, 1954–55, 1967–68, 1971–72, 1972–73, 1983–84, 1984–85, 1995–96, 2005–06
- Cypriot Super Cup:
  - Winners (3): 1955, 2018, 2025
  - Runners-up (5): 1953, 1954, 1988, 1996, 2004

Notes:

- Following a decision by the Executive Committee of the Cyprus Football Association (CFA/KOP), upon the opinion of its legal advisor, on 19th June 2025, a request by AEK Larnaca was approved for the recognition of the titles of EPA Larnaca and Pezoporikos Larnaca in the name of AEK Larnaca.

== European competitions record ==
Last update: 5 November 2022

UEFA competitions
Competition	Played	Won	Drawn	Lost	Goals For	Goals Against	Last season played
UEFA Champions League	2	0	2	0	2	2	2022–23
UEFA Europa League / UEFA Cup	67	28	16	16	95	70	2022–23
UEFA Europa Conference League	10	2	3	5	6	16	2024–25
UEFA Cup Winners' Cup	4	1	1	2	5	3	1996–97
Total	78	31	22	23	108	91	

=== Matches ===
Season	Competition	Round	Club	Home	Away	Aggregate
1996–97	UEFA Cup Winners' Cup	Qualifying round	(Armenia) Kotayk Abovian	5–0	0–1	5–1
1996–97	UEFA Cup Winners' Cup	First round	(Spain) Barcelona	0–0	0–2	0–2
2004–05	UEFA Cup	Second qualifying round	(Israel) Maccabi Petah Tikva	3–0	0–4	3–4
2011–12	UEFA Europa League	Second qualifying round	(Malta) Floriana	1–0	8–0	9–0
2011–12	UEFA Europa League	Third qualifying round	(Czech Republic) Mladá Boleslav	3–0	2–2	5–2
2011–12	UEFA Europa League	Play-off round	(Norway) Rosenborg	2–1	0–0	2–1
2011–12	UEFA Europa League	Group stage (J)	(Israel) Maccabi Haifa	2–1	0–1	4th place
2011–12	UEFA Europa League	Group stage (J)	(Romania) Steaua București	1–1	1–3	4th place
2011–12	UEFA Europa League	Group stage (J)	(Germany) Schalke 04	0–5	0–0	4th place
2015–16	UEFA Europa League	Third qualifying round	(France) Bordeaux	0–1	0–3	0–4
2016–17	UEFA Europa League	First qualifying round	(San Marino) Folgore	3–0	3–1	6–1
2016–17	UEFA Europa League	Second qualifying round	(Northern Ireland) Cliftonville	2–0	3–2	5–2
2016–17	UEFA Europa League	Third qualifying round	(Russia) Spartak Moscow	1–1	1–0	2–1
2016–17	UEFA Europa League	Play-off round	(Czech Republic) Slovan Liberec	0–1	0–3	0–4
2017–18	UEFA Europa League	First qualifying round	(Gibraltar) Lincoln Red Imps	5–0	1–1	6–1
2017–18	UEFA Europa League	Second qualifying round	(Republic of Ireland) Cork City	1–0	1–0	2–0
2017–18	UEFA Europa League	Third qualifying round	(Belarus) Dinamo Minsk	2–0	1–1	3–1
2017–18	UEFA Europa League	Play-off round	(Czech Republic) Viktoria Plzeň	0–0	1–3	1–3
2018–19	UEFA Europa League	Second qualifying round	(Republic of Ireland) Dundalk	4–0	0–0	4–0
2018–19	UEFA Europa League	Third qualifying round	(Austria) Sturm Graz	5–0	2–0	7–0
2018–19	UEFA Europa League	Play-off round	(Slovakia) AS Trenčín	3–0	1–1	4–1
2018–19	UEFA Europa League	Group stage (A)	(Germany) Bayer Leverkusen	1–5	2–4	3rd place
2018–19	UEFA Europa League	Group stage (A)	(Bulgaria) Ludogorets Razgrad	1–1	0–0	3rd place
2018–19	UEFA Europa League	Group stage (A)	(Switzerland) Zürich	0–1	2–1	3rd place
2019–20	UEFA Europa League	First qualifying round	(Moldova) Petrocub Hîncești	1–0	1–0	2–0
2019–20	UEFA Europa League	Second qualifying round	(Bulgaria) Levski Sofia	3–0	4–0	7–0
2019–20	UEFA Europa League	Third qualifying round	(Belgium) Gent	1–1	0–3	1–4
2022–23	UEFA Champions League	Second qualifying round	(Denmark) Midtjylland	1−1 (a.e.t.)	1–1	2–2 (3–4 p)
2022–23	UEFA Europa League	Third qualifying round	(Serbia) Partizan	2–1	2–2	4–3
2022–23	UEFA Europa League	Play-off round	(Ukraine) Dnipro-1	3–0	2–1	5–1
2022–23	UEFA Europa League	Group stage (B)	(Ukraine) Dynamo Kyiv	3–3	1–0	3rd place
2022–23	UEFA Europa League	Group stage (B)	(France) Rennes	1–2	1–1	3rd place
2022–23	UEFA Europa League	Group stage (B)	(Turkey) Fenerbahçe	1–2	0–2	3rd place
2022–23	UEFA Europa Conference League	Knockout round play-offs	(Ukraine) Dnipro-1	1–0	0–0	1–0
2022–23	UEFA Europa Conference League	Round of 16	(England) West Ham United	0–2	0–4	0–6
2023–24	UEFA Europa Conference League	Second qualifying round	(Belarus) Torpedo-BelAZ Zhodino	1−1	3−2	4−3
2023–24	UEFA Europa Conference League	Third qualifying round	(Israel) Maccabi Tel Aviv	1–1	0–1	1–2
2024–25	UEFA Conference League	Second qualifying round	(Hungary) Paks	0−2	0−3	0−5
2025–26	UEFA Europa League	First qualifying round	(Serbia) Partizan	1–0	1–2 (a.e.t.)	2–2 (6–5 p)
2025–26	UEFA Europa League	Second qualifying round	(Slovenia) Celje	2–1	1–1	3–2
2025–26	UEFA Europa League	Third qualifying round	(Poland) Legia Warsaw	4–1	1–2	5–3
2025–26	UEFA Europa League	Play-off round	(Norway) Brann	0–4	1–2	1–6
2025–26	UEFA Conference League	League phase	(Netherlands) AZ	4–0	—N/a	8th place
2025–26	UEFA Conference League	League phase	(England) Crystal Palace	—N/a	1–0	8th place
2025–26	UEFA Conference League	League phase	(Scotland) Aberdeen	0–0	—N/a	8th place
2025–26	UEFA Conference League	League phase	(Croatia) Rijeka	—N/a	0–0	8th place
2025–26	UEFA Conference League	League phase	(Sweden) BK Häcken	—N/a	1–1	8th place
2025–26	UEFA Conference League	League phase	(North Macedonia) Shkëndija	1–0	—N/a	8th place
2025–26	UEFA Conference League	Round of 16	(England) Crystal Palace	1–2 (a.e.t.)	0–0	1–2
2026–27	UEFA Conference League	Second qualifying round	(Israel) Beitar Jerusalem	0−1	3−2 (a.e.t.)	3−3 (3–4 p)

== Players ==
=== Current squad ===
As of 16 September 2026

Note: Flags indicate national team as defined under FIFA eligibility rules; some limited exceptions apply. Players may hold more than one non-FIFA nationality.

No.	Pos.	Nation	Player
1	GK	BIH	Vedad Muftić
2	DF	CYP	Petros Ioannou
3	DF	NED	Mike van der Hoorn
4	DF	ESP	Enric Saborit
5	DF	ESP	Brian Oliván
6	MF	BUL	Ivan Pankov
7	MF	POR	Gus Ledes (Vice-captain)
8	FW	IRQ	Youssef Amyn
9	FW	SRB	Đorđe Ivanović
10	FW	VEN	Yerson Chacón
11	FW	BIH	Riad Bajić
12	GK	CYP	Andreas Koulentros
14	FW	TUN	Amor Layouni
15	DF	BIH	Hrvoje Miličević (Captain)
17	DF	CYP	Kostas Pileas

No.	Pos.	Nation	Player
19	FW	ROU	Atanas Trică
20	MF	SLO	Jan Repas
21	DF	ESP	Jorge Miramón
22	DF	NGR	Godswill Ekpolo
23	MF	GER	Sven Köhler
25	MF	CYP	Champos Kyriakou
28	MF	SWE	Kerim Mrabti
29	MF	CYP	Giorgos Naoum
30	FW	ARG	Enzo Cabrera
33	FW	ARG	Nicolás Andereggen
37	FW	CYP	David Gerasimou
44	DF	CYP	Zacharias Adoni
51	GK	CYP	Andreas Paraskevas
92	GK	ITA	Alberto Paleari
99	GK	CYP	Dimitris Dimitriou

=== Out on loan ===
Note: Flags indicate national team as defined under FIFA eligibility rules; some limited exceptions apply. Players may hold more than one non-FIFA nationality.

No.	Pos.	Nation	Player
39	FW	CYP	Petros M. Ioannou (at MEAP Nisou )
19	FW	CYP	Christos Loukaides (at Spartakos Kitiou )
41	MF	VEN	Matías González (at Omonia Aradippou )
42	DF	CYP	Maximos Petousis (at Digenis Morphou )
34	DF	CYP	Marios Praxitelous Al-Herek (at Olympiakos Nicosia )
35	MF	CYP	Christodoulos Thoma (at MEAP Nisou )

=== Active International players ===
International Cypriot Players

- (Cyprus) Kostas Pileas
- (Cyprus) Andreas Paraskevas
- (Cyprus) Charalambos Kyriakou
- (Cyprus) Giorgos Naoum

International Foreign Players

- (Iraq) Youssef Amyn (2026 FIFA World Cup)

International Youth Cypriot Players

- David Gerasimou (Cyprus U17)

International Youth Foreign Players

- Ivan Pankov (Bulgaria U21)
- Atanas Trică (Romania U21)

=== Foreign players ===
EU Nationals

- (Spain) (Europe) Jorge Miramón
- (Spain) (Europe) Enric Saborit
- (Spain) (Europe) Brian Oliván
- (Slovenia) (Europe) Jan Repas
- (Netherlands) (Europe) Mike van der Hoorn
- (Germany) (Europe) Sven Köhler
- (Italy) (Europe) Alberto Paleari

Dual citizenship players

- (Portugal) (Brazil) Gus Ledes
- (Bosnia and Herzegovina) (Croatia) Hrvoje Miličević
- (Nigeria) (Spain) Godswill Ekpolo
- (Serbia) (Croatia) Đorđe Ivanović
- (Argentina) (Switzerland) Nicolás Andereggen
- (Iraq) (Germany) Youssef Amyn
- (Bulgaria) (Cyprus) Ivan Pankov
- (Tunisia) (Sweden) Amor Layouni
- (Tunisia) (Sweden) Kerim Mrabti

Non-EU Nationals

- (Argentina) Enzo Cabrera
- (Bosnia and Herzegovina) Riad Bajić
- (Bosnia and Herzegovina) Vedad Muftić
- (Venezuela) Yerson Chacón

Under-23 Foreign Players

- (Romania) Atanas Trică

== Club officials ==
=== Board of directors ===
Position	Staff
Chairman	(Cyprus) Antros Karapatakis
Members	(Cyprus) Andreas Lefkaritis
Members	(Cyprus) Joseph Frangos
Members	(Cyprus) Giorgos Savva
Members	(Cyprus) Evmeos Efthymiades

Source: ΔΙΟΙΚΗΤΙΚΟ ΣΥΜΒΟΥΛΙΟ

=== Technical and medical staff ===
Position	Staff
Technical director	(Spain) Xavi Roca
Chief scout	(Spain) Carles Martínez
Team managers	(Cyprus) Marcos Sofroniou
Team managers	(Cyprus) Lefteris Petrides
Head Coach	(Spain) Rubén Sellés
Assistant coach	(Spain) Iñaki Astiz
Assistant coach/ Analyst	(Spain) Vicent Gilabert
Technical staff member	(Argentina) Adrián Lucero
Goalkeeper coach	(Albania) Arjan Beqaj
Fitness coach	vacant
Assistant fitness coach / Rehabilitation	(Cyprus) Panayiotis Michael
Medical staff
Head of performance and medical department	(Spain) Juan Torrijo
Team doctor (orthopaedist)	(Cyprus) Dr Giannis Efstathiades
Team doctor (pathologist)	(Cyprus) Dr Kyriacos Economides
Physiotherapists
Physiotherapists	(Cyprus) Tasos Kyriacou
Physiotherapists	(Cyprus) Costas Gavrielides
Physiotherapists	(Cyprus) Michalis Panagiotou
Physiotherapists	(Cyprus) Giannis Georgiou
Nutritionist	(Cyprus) Christina Strouthou
Masseur	(Greece) Christos Delides
Caregivers	(Romania) Florin Jucan
Caregivers	(India) Khushi Ram

Source: ΤΕΧΝΙΚΗ ΗΓΕΣΙΑ

=== Other staff ===
Position	Staff
General Manager	(Cyprus) Afxentis Evangelou
Press Officer	(Cyprus) Kyriacos Demetriou
Secretary	(Cyprus) Sofia Georgiou
Boutique Manager	(Cyprus) Maria Yiasemidou
Head of Marketing Department	(Cyprus) Christina Evangelou
Marketing Officer	(Cyprus) Christoforos Stylianou
Head of the Ticket Department	(Cyprus) Melina Sklavou
Voluntary Staff
Head of Women Volleyball team	(Cyprus) Neoptolemos Andreou
Head of Social Media Networking	(Cyprus) Adamantini Elia
Head of Player Escorts	(Cyprus) Maria Tziva

=== Academy organisation ===
Position	Staff
Academy President	(Cyprus) Joseph Frangos
Academy Director	(Cyprus) Anastasis Stylianou
Officer of Programms,Development and Coach training	(Cyprus) Kyriakos Kyriakou
Technical Director	(Cyprus) Panayiotis Giannou
Scaouter	(Cyprus) Giorgos Konstantinou
Head of Grassroots	(Cyprus) Sotos Ioulianos
U13 coach	(Cyprus) Konstantinos Andreou
U13 Fitness Coach	(Cyprus) Theodoros Pieri
U13 Goalkeeping Coach	(Cyprus) Michalis Georgiou
U14 coach	(Cyprus) Charalambos Christoforou
U14 Fitness Coach	(Cyprus) Giorgos Mavrogiannis
U14 Goalkeeping Coach	(Cyprus) Glaukos Glaukou
U15 coach	(Cyprus) Giorgos Pedonomos
U15 Fitness Coach	(Cyprus) Giorgos Mavrogiannis
U15 Goalkeeping Coach	(Cyprus) Glaukos Glaukou
U16 coach	(Cyprus) Stavros Raounas
U16 Assistant Coach	(Bulgaria) Pavel Toskov
U16 Fitness Coach	(Cyprus) Dimitris Dimitriou
U16 Goalkeeping Coach	(Cyprus) Panagiotis Kythreotis
U17 coach	(Cyprus) Konstantinos Konstantinou
U17 Assistant Coach	(Bulgaria) Pavel Toskov
U17 Fitness Coach	(Cyprus) Dimitris Dimitriou
U17 Goalkeeping Coach	(Cyprus) Panagiotis Kythreotis
U19 coach	(Cyprus) Dimitris Dimitriou
U19 Assistant Coach	(Greece) Vasilis Vallianos
U19 Goalkeeping Coach	(Cyprus) Makis Mama
U19 Fitness Coach	(Cyprus) Stavros Parpas
Medical staff and other staff
Team doctor (orthopaedist)	(Cyprus) Dr Giannis Efstathiades
Physiotherapists	(Cyprus) Michalis Papettas
Physiotherapists	(Cyprus) Marios Frangos
Nutritionist	(Cyprus) Giannis Koutras
Sport Psychologist	(Cyprus) Thalia Panagi
Grounds and clothing Manager	(Cyprus) Kikis Vasiliou
Social Media manager	(Cyprus) Vaso Ioannou

Source: ΟΡΓΑΝΟΓΡΑΜΜΑ

== Managerial history ==
- (Cyprus) Andreas Mouskallis (1994)
- (Cyprus) Stavros Papadopoulos (1994 – 1998)
- (Greece) Petros Ravousis (1998 – 1999)
- (Serbia) Radmilo Ivančević (1999 – 2000)
- (Serbia) Dusan Mitosevic(2001 – 2002)
- (Cyprus) Michalis Hadjipieris (2002 – 2003)
- (Cyprus) Nikos Andronikou (2003)
- (Cyprus) Andreas Mouskallis (December 2003 – November 2004)
- (Cyprus) Neophytos Larkou (2004)
- (Bulgaria) Nikolay Kostov (December 2004 – 2005)
- (Cyprus) Marios Constantinou (2005 – September 2007)
- (Israel) Nir Klinger (September 20, 2007 – June 30, 2008)
- (Greece) Makis Katsavakis (October 2008 – December 08)
- (Cyprus) Louis Stefani (December 2008)
- (Cyprus) Christos Kassianos (January 2009)
- (Cyprus) Savvas Constantinou (February 2009 – November 2009)
- (Cyprus) Andreas Michaelides (December 2009 – 10 May 2010)
- (Netherlands) Ton Caanen (1 July 2010 – 20 November 2011)
- (Netherlands) Leon Vlemmings (3 December 2011 – 30 May 2012)
- (Israel) Ran Ben Shimon (3 July 2012 – 20 May 2013)
- (Greece) Dimitrios Eleftheropoulos (1 July 2013 – 15 December 2013)
- (Cyprus) Floros Nicolaou (16 December 2013 – 31 May 2014)
- (Denmark) (Spain) Thomas Christiansen (1 June 2014 – 29 April 2016)
- (Spain) Imanol Idiakez (2 June 2016 – 21 May 2018)
- (Spain) Andoni Iraola (23 May 2018 – 14 January 2019)
- (Spain) Imanol Idiakez (15 January 2019 – 9 December 2019)
- (Cyprus) Elias Charalambous (9 December 2019 – 25 February 2020)
- (Spain) David Caneda (26 February 2020 – 20 Sep 2020)
- (Spain) Joan Carrillo (21 September 2020 – 24 November 2020)
- (Cyprus) Sofronis Avgousti (24 November 2020 – 24 April 2021)
- (Spain) David Catalá (1 Jun 2021 – 21 March 2022)
- (Spain) David Badía (25 Mar 2022 – 30 June 2022)
- (Spain) Jose Luis Oltra (1 July 2022 – 10 November 2023)
- (Israel) Ran Ben Shimon (11 Nov 2023 – 14 May 2024)
- (Spain) Juan Ferrando (16 May 2024 – 13 Aug 2024)
- (Norway) Henning Berg (14 Aug 2024 – 26 May 2025)
- (Spain) Imanol Idiakez (30 May 2025 – 4 March 2026)
- (Spain) Javi Rozada (10 March 2026 – 23 May 2026)
- (Argentina) (Italy) Mauro Camoranesi (17 June 2026 – 14 August 2026)
- (Spain) Iñaki Astiz (14 August 2026 – present)

== UEFA and IFFHS rankings ==
=== UEFA Club ranking ===
Rank	Country	Team	Points
98	(Switzerland)	Lugano	21.250
99	(Austria)	LASK	21.000
100	(Cyprus)	AEK Larnaca	20.250
101	(France)	Nice	20.000
102	(Moldova)	Sheriff Tiraspol	20.000

Last update: 30 May 2026

=== IFFHS Club World ranking ===
Rank	Country	Team	Points
138	(Romania)	Universitatea Craiova CS	102.75
140	(Uruguay)	CA River Plate	102
140	(England)	Newcastle United FC	102
140	(Cyprus)	AEK Larnaca	102
143	(Denmark)	FC Copenhagen	100.5
143	(Mexico)	FC Pachuca	100.5
145	(Republic of Ireland)	Shamrock Rovers FC	99.5

Last update: 17 January 2023
