= 2024–25 Cypriot Cup =

83rd edition of the Cypriot Cup

2024–25 Cyprus Coca-Cola Cup

Tournament details
- Country: Cyprus
- Dates: 25 September 2024 – 24 May 2025
- Teams: 27

Final positions
- Champions: AEK Larnaca
- Runners-up: Pafos

Tournament statistics
- Matches played: 28
- Goals scored: 98 (3.5 per match)
- Top goal scorer(s): Aitor Cantalapiedra; Loizos Loizou (4 goals each)

The 2024–25 Cypriot Cup was the 83rd edition of the Cypriot Cup. It was contested by 26 teams from the Cypriot First and Second Division. It began on 25 September 2024, with the final taking place on 24 May 2025 at the GSP Stadium in Nicosia.

In the final, AEK Larnaca defeated the defending champions Pafos—who were aiming for a domestic double—to win their third title and qualify for the 2025–26 UEFA Europa League first qualifying round.

== Format ==
The tournament begins with 22 teams entering the first round; five teams receive a bye to the second round. In the first round, the ties are one-legged, and First Division clubs are drawn against Second Division clubs.

The second round is contested by 16 teams: the ones which qualified from the first round, and those which were exempt from the first round. The ties in the second round are one-legged, and from this point onwards, there are no restrictions on the draws. The ties in the quarter-finals are also one-legged. The semi-finals are the only round of the tournament, where the ties will be two-legged.

The final is contested in a single game, and will take place at the GSP Stadium. The winners qualify for the first qualifying round of the 2025–26 Europa League.

If, in any round, a winner is not determined after 90 minutes, the two teams play extra time. If a winner is still not determined after extra time, a penalty shootout takes place. There is no away goals rule.

== First round ==
The draw for the first round took place on 12 September 2024. The previous season's cup finalists (Pafos and Omonia), 2024–25 UEFA Conference League qualifiers APOEL, and two clubs from the 2024–25 Cypriot Second Division (PAEEK and Spartakos Kitiou) received byes.

Team 1	Score	Team 2
25 September 2024
Othellos Athienou (2)	0–4	Apollon Limassol (1)
1 October 2024
AEK Larnaca (1)	5–0	Akritas Chlorakas (2)
2 October 2024
Olympiakos Nicosia (2)	1–4	Anorthosis Famagusta (1)
Ethnikos Achna (1)	3–1	AEZ Zakakiou (2)
Nea Salamis (1)	1–0	Doxa Katokopias (2)
23 October 2024
Chalkanoras Idaliou (2)	0–1	Omonia 29M (1)
Karmiotissa Pano Polemidia (1)	2–3	Ayia Napa (2)
30 October 2024
Achyronas-Onisilos (2)	0–2	AEL Limassol (1)
ASIL Lysi (2)	1–6	Aris Limassol (1)
6 November 2024
Anagennisi Deryneia (2)	1–2	Enosis Neon Paralimni (1)
Krasava ENY Ypsonas (2)	1–2	Omonia Aradippou (1)

== Second round ==
The eleven first round winners and five teams given first round byes entered the second round.

Team 1	Score	Team 2
4 December 2024
Apollon Limassol (1)	0–0 (a.e.t.) (4–3 p)	Ethnikos Achna (1)
Ayia Napa (2)	1–4	AEL Limassol (1)
10 December 2024
AEK Larnaca (1)	8–0	PAEEK (2)
11 December 2024
Enosis Neon Paralimni (1)	0–0 (a.e.t.) (4–2 p)	Nea Salamis (1)
Omonia Aradippou (1)	2–4	Anorthosis Famagusta (1)
15 January 2025
Omonia (1)	7–0	Spartakos Kitiou (2)
Pafos (1)	1–1 (a.e.t.) (5–4 p)	Aris Limassol (1)
16 January 2025
APOEL (1)	6–1	Omonia 29M (1)

== Quarter-finals ==
The eight second round winners entered the quarter-finals.

Team 1	Score	Team 2
28 January 2025
Omonia (1)	3–0	AEL Limassol (1)
29 January 2025
Anorthosis Famagusta (1)	1–3	Apollon Limassol (1)
Enosis Neon Paralimni (1)	0–3	AEK Larnaca (1)
30 January 2025
APOEL (1)	1–1 (a.e.t.) (4–5 p)	Pafos (1)

== Semi-finals ==
The four quarter-final winners entered the semi-finals, held over two legs.

Team 1	Agg.	Team 2	1st leg	2nd leg
Omonia (1)	1–2	AEK Larnaca (1)	0–0	1–2
Pafos (1)	6–2	Apollon Limassol (1)	4–2	2–0

== Final ==
The final was held between the two semi-final winners.

24 May 2025
20:00 EEST

AEK Larnaca	0–0 (a.e.t.)	Pafos
	Report
Penalties
Miličević (penalty scored); Angielski (penalty scored); Cantalapiedra (penalty missed); Gama (penalty scored); Gustavo (penalty scored); García (penalty scored)	5–4	(penalty scored) Oršić; (penalty scored) Anderson; (penalty scored) Tanković; (penalty scored) Jaja; (penalty missed) Goldar; (penalty missed) Quina

GSP Stadium, Nicosia
Referee: Daniel Siebert (Germany)
