= 2022–23 Pafos FC season =

Pafos
2022–23 season
- Owner: Pavel Gognidze
- Manager: Henning Berg (until 3 April)
- Stadium: Stelios Kyriakides Stadium
- Cyta Championship: 4th
- Cypriot Cup: Semifinal vs AC Omonia
- Top goalscorer: League: Jairo (18); All: Jairo (20)
Home colours	Away colours

The 2022–23 season was Pafos's 9th year in existence, and sixth season in the Cypriot First Division.

== Season review ==
On 11 June, Pafos announced Henning Berg as the clubs new Head Coach.

On 22 June, Pafos announced the loan signing of João Pedro from Athletico Paranaense until the end of the season.

On 25 June, Pafos announced the signing of Marcinho on a free transfer.

On 27 June, Pafos announced the signing of Marios Demetriou from PAEEK.

On 2 July, Pafos announced that they had extended the loan of Kenan Bajrić from Slovan Bratislava for an additional season. The following day, 3 July, Pafos announced the signing of Juninho from Zorya Luhansk. On 4 July, Pafos announced the signing of Bruno Tavares from Sporting CP.

On 21 July, Pafos announced the signing of Muamer Tanković from AEK Athens.

On 5 August, Pafos announced the signing of Pedro Pelágio on loan from Marítimo, and Levan Kharabadze from Dinamo Tbilisi.

On 8 August, Pafos announced the signing of Jordan Ikoko on a free transfer after he'd left Ludogorets Razgrad.

On 17 August, Pafos announced the signing of Oier Olazábal from Espanyol

On 23 August, Pafos announced the signing of Mamadou Kané on loan from Olympiacos.

On 30 August, Pafos announced the loan signing of Filip Majchrowicz from Radomiak Radom, whilst Moustapha Name signed from Paris FC the following day.

On 30 September, Pafos announced the signing of Besart Abdurahimi on loan from Akritas Chlorakas.

On 25 November, Onni Valakari extended his contract with Pafos until June 2026.

On 8 December, Josef Kvída extended his contract with Pafos until June 2026.

On 2 January, Jefté Betancor joined Pafos on loan for the remainder of the season.

On 25 January, Pafos announced that Hamadi Al Ghaddioui had left the club to join an unnamed 2. Bundesliga club.

On 26 January, Pafos announced the departure of Willy Semedo for a record fee, and the signing of Ivica Ivušić.

On 31 January, Pafos announced the signing of Bruno Felipe from Omonia.

On 3 April, Henning Berg was relieved of his duties as Head Coach of Pafos.

On 13 June, Pafos announced the departure of Deni Hočko and Eirik Hestad.

== Squad ==
As of match played 28 May 2023

No.	Name	Nationality	Position	Date of birth (age)	Signed from	Signed in	Contract ends	Apps.	Goals
Goalkeepers
1	Oier Olazábal	(Spain)	GK	14 September 1989 (aged 33)	Espanyol	2022		3	0
26	Ivica Ivušić	(Croatia)	GK	1 February 1995 (aged 28)	NK Osijek	2023		20	0
31	Daniel Antosch	(Austria)	GK	7 March 2000 (aged 23)	Liefering	2021		21	0
99	Filip Majchrowicz	(Poland)	GK	9 February 2000 (aged 23)	on loan from Radomiak Radom	2022	2023	0	0
Defenders
2	Jeisson Palacios	(Colombia)	DF	20 March 1994 (aged 29)	Santa Fe	2021		33	2
4	Josef Kvída	(Czech Republic)	DF	16 January 1997 (aged 26)	NEC Nijmegen	2020	2026	96	4
5	Levan Kharabadze	(Georgia (country))	DF	26 January 2000 (aged 23)	Dinamo Tbilisi	2022		4	0
13	Jordan Ikoko	(Democratic Republic of the Congo)	DF	3 February 1994 (aged 29)	Ludogorets Razgrad	2022		36	0
14	Marios Demetriou	(Cyprus)	DF	25 December 1992 (aged 30)	PAEEK	2022		12	1
20	Juninho	(Brazil)	DF	26 December 1995 (aged 27)	Zorya Luhansk	2022		36	1
23	Alexandros Michael	(Cyprus)	DF	28 January 2000 (aged 23)	Karmiotissa	2021		9	0
33	Kenan Bajrić	(Slovenia)	DF	20 December 1994 (aged 28)	loan from Slovan Bratislava	2021	2023	70	0
	André Moreira	(Portugal)	DF	5 January 2003 (aged 20)	União de Leiria	2022		0	0
Midfielders
6	Deni Hočko	(Montenegro)	MF	22 April 1994 (aged 29)	Mouscron	2021		42	2
8	Mamadou Kané	(Guinea)	MF	22 January 1997 (aged 26)	on loan from Olympiacos	2022	2023	37	3
17	Besart Abdurahimi	(North Macedonia)	MF	31 July 1990 (aged 32)	on loan from Akritas Chlorakas	2022	2023	31	10
19	Eirik Hestad	(Norway)	MF	26 June 1995 (aged 27)	Molde	2022		35	1
24	Onni Valakari	(Finland)	MF	18 August 1999 (aged 23)	Tromsø	2020	2026	111	39
25	Moustapha Name	(Senegal)	MF	5 May 1995 (aged 28)	Paris FC	2022		27	4
30	Vlad Dragomir	(Romania)	MF	24 April 1999 (aged 24)	Virtus Entella	2021		57	2
49	Bruno Tavares	(Portugal)	MF	16 April 2002 (aged 21)	Sporting CP	2022		5	0
60	Pedro Pelágio	(Portugal)	MF	21 April 2000 (aged 23)	on loan from Marítimo	2022		20	0
Forwards
10	Jairo	(Brazil)	FW	6 May 1992 (aged 31)	Hajduk Split	2021		65	28
11	Jefté Betancor	(Spain)	FW	6 July 1993 (aged 29)	on loan from CFR Cluj	2023	2023	12	1
22	Muamer Tanković	(Sweden)	FW	22 February 1995 (aged 28)	AEK Athens	2022		36	8
27	Bruno Felipe	(Brazil)	FW	26 May 1994 (aged 29)	Omonia	2023		17	1
70	Lysandros Papastylianou	(Cyprus)	FW	29 November 2005 (aged 17)	Academy	2021		3	0
Out on loan
	Marcinho	(Brazil)	DF	16 May 1996 (aged 27)	Unattached	2022		0	0
	Marcelo Torres	(Argentina)	FW	6 November 1997 (aged 25)	Boca Juniors	2020		36	9
	Magomedkhabib Abdusalamov	(Russia)	FW	1 May 2003 (aged 20)	Rodina Moscow	2021		18	3
Left during the season
5	Kyriakos Antoniou	(Cyprus)	DF	3 May 2001 (aged 22)	Academy	2018		31	1
7	Willy Semedo	(Cape Verde)	FW	27 April 1994 (aged 29)	Grenoble	2021	2023	48	9
9	Hamadi Al Ghaddioui	(Germany)	FW	22 September 1990 (aged 32)	VfB Stuttgart	2022		23	5
12	Evgenios Petrou	(Cyprus)	GK	6 September 1997 (aged 25)	Ethnikos Assia	2018		14	0
16	Bruno Leite	(Cape Verde)	MF	26 March 1995 (aged 28)	Haugesund	2021		4	0
21	Gerasimos Fylaktou	(Cyprus)	MF	24 July 1991 (aged 31)	Ermis Aradippou	2019	2022(+1)		
25	Navarone Foor	(Netherlands)	MF	4 February 1992 (aged 31)	Al-Ittihad Kalba	2020		64	1
36	João Pedro	(Brazil)	MF	8 February 2002 (aged 21)	on loan from Athletico Paranaense	2022	2023	0	0
86	Alexandros Spontas	(Cyprus)	MF	27 November 2002 (aged 20)	Academy	2020		4	0
	Douglas Aurélio	(Brazil)	FW	27 March 1999 (aged 24)	Estoril Praia	2021		24	4

=== Out on loan ===
Note: Flags indicate national team as defined under FIFA eligibility rules; some limited exceptions apply. Players may hold more than one non-FIFA nationality.

No.	Pos.	Nation	Player
—	DF	BRA	Marcinho (at América Mineiro)
—	FW	CYP	Marko Jovanović (at Peyia 2014 until 30 June 2023)
—	FW	ARG	Marcelo Torres (at Akritas Chlorakas until 31 May 2023)
—	FW	RUS	Magomedkhabib Abdusalamov (at Akritas Chlorakas until 31 May 2023)

=== Left club during season ===
Note: Flags indicate national team as defined under FIFA eligibility rules; some limited exceptions apply. Players may hold more than one non-FIFA nationality.

No.	Pos.	Nation	Player
5	DF	CYP	Kyriakos Antoniou (to AEZ Zakakiou)
7	FW	CPV	Willy Semedo (to Al Faisaly)
9	FW	GER	Hamadi Al Ghaddioui
12	GK	CYP	Evgenios Petrou
16	MF	CPV	Bruno Leite (to FK Haugesund)
—	FW	BRA	Douglas Aurélio (to Riga)

== Transfers ==
=== In ===
Date	Position	Nationality	Name	From	Fee	Ref.
25 June 2022	DF	(Brazil)	Marcinho	Unattached	Free	
27 June 2022	DF	(Cyprus)	Marios Demetriou	PAEEK	Undisclosed	
3 July 2022	DF	(Brazil)	Juninho	Zorya Luhansk	Undisclosed	
4 July 2022	MF	(Portugal)	Bruno Tavares	Sporting CP	Undisclosed	
21 July 2022	FW	(Sweden)	Muamer Tanković	AEK Athens	Undisclosed	
1 August 2022	DF	(Portugal)	André Moreira	União de Leiria	Undisclosed	
5 August 2022	DF	(Georgia (country))	Levan Kharabadze	Dinamo Tbilisi	Undisclosed	
8 August 2022	DF	(Democratic Republic of the Congo)	Jordan Ikoko	Ludogorets Razgrad	Free	
17 August 2022	GK	(Spain)	Oier Olazábal	Espanyol	Free	
31 August 2022	MF	(Senegal)	Moustapha Name	Paris FC	Undisclosed	
26 January 2023	GK	(Croatia)	Ivica Ivušić	NK Osijek	Undisclosed	
31 January 2023	FW	(Brazil)	Bruno Felipe	Omonia	Undisclosed	

=== Loans in ===
Start date	Position	Nationality	Name	From	End date	Ref.
22 June 2022	MF	(Brazil)	João Pedro	Athletico Paranaense	31 December 2022	
2 July 2022	DF	(Slovenia)	Kenan Bajrić	Slovan Bratislava	End of season	
5 August 2022	MF	(Portugal)	Pedro Pelágio	Marítimo	End of season	
23 August 2022	MF	(Guinea)	Mamadou Kané	Olympiacos	End of season	
30 August 2022	GK	(Poland)	Filip Majchrowicz	Radomiak Radom	End of season	
30 September 2022	MF	(North Macedonia)	Besart Abdurahimi	Akritas Chlorakas	End of season	
2 January 2023	FW	(Spain)	Jefté Betancor	CFR Cluj	End of season	

=== Out ===
Date	Position	Nationality	Name	To	Fee	Ref.
28 August 2022	MF	(Netherlands)	Navarone Foor	Riga	Undisclosed	
6 September 2022	MF	(Cyprus)	Alexandros Spontas	Krasava ENY Ypsonas	Undisclosed	
26 January 2023	FW	(Cape Verde)	Willy Semedo	Al Faisaly	Undisclosed	
3 February 2023	FW	(Brazil)	Douglas Aurélio	Riga	Undisclosed	

=== Loans out ===
Start date	Position	Nationality	Name	To	End date	Ref.
15 June 2022	FW	(Brazil)	Douglas Aurélio	Riga	31 December 2022	
17 June 2022	FW	(Argentina)	Marcelo Torres	Riga	31 December 2022	
3 August 2022	DF	(Brazil)	Marcinho	Bahia	31 December 2022	
22 August 2022	FW	(Russia)	Magomedkhabib Abdusalamov	Akritas Chlorakas	30 June 2023	
24 January 2023	FW	(Argentina)	Marcelo Torres	Akritas Chlorakas	30 June 2023	
6 April 2023	DF	(Brazil)	Marcinho	América Mineiro		

=== Released ===
Date	Position	Nationality	Name	Joined	Date	Ref
17 August 2022	DF	(Cyprus)	Kyriakos Antoniou	AEZ Zakakiou		
1 September 2022	GK	(Cyprus)	Evgenios Petrou	AEZ Zakakiou		
8 September 2022	MF	(Cape Verde)	Bruno Leite	Haugesund	8 September 2022	
9 November 2022	MF	(Cyprus)	Gerasimos Fylaktou	ENAD Polis Chrysochous	27 July 2023	
25 January 2023	FW	(Germany)	Hamadi Al Ghaddioui	SV Sandhausen	26 January 2023	
13 June 2023	MF	(Montenegro)	Deni Hočko	Beitar Jerusalem	23 August 2023	
13 June 2023	MF	(Norway)	Eirik Hestad	Molde	7 July 2023	
30 June 2023	GK	(Austria)	Daniel Antosch	Apollon Limassol	1 July 2023	
30 June 2023	DF	(Georgia (country))	Levan Kharabadze	Dinamo Batumi		
30 June 2023	FW	(Argentina)	Marcelo Torres	United FC		

== Friendlies ==
14 July 2022	Auda (Latvia)	1–2	(Cyprus) Pafos	Latvia
15:00 EEST (UTC+3)		Report		Stadium: BSG Training Centre

25 July 2022	Udinese (Italy)	2–1	(Cyprus) Pafos	Lienz, Austria
18:00 EEST (UTC+3)	Ebosele (yellow card) 59'; Samardžić 88'; Success 89'	Report	Jairo 18'; (yellow card) 59'	Stadium: Dolomited Stadion

28 July 2022	Empoli (Italy)	2–1	(Cyprus) Pafos	Wörgl, Austria
14:30 EEST (UTC+3)	Haas 4'; Luperto (yellow card) 18'; Destro 33'	Report	Al Ghaddioui 11' (yellow card) 18'	Stadium: Sportzentrum Worgl Stadium

3 August 2022	Pafos (Cyprus)	4–0	(United Arab Emirates) Al Wahda	Wiener Neudorf, Austria
19:00 EEST (UTC+3)	Tanković 11'; 38' (o.g.); Jairo 57'; Semedo 85'	Report		Stadium: Wiener Neudorf Stadion

13 August 2022	Pafos	1–0	Doxa Katokopias	Paphos
19:00 EET (UTC+2)	Valakari 51'	Report		Stadium: Stelios Kyriakides Stadium

20 August 2022	Anorthosis Famagusta	3–4	Pafos	Larnaca
19:00 EET (UTC+2)	Embralitze 16', 24'; Ferreira 53'	Report	Jairo 13', 38'; Kvída 38'; Valakari 83'	Stadium: Antonis Papadopoulos Stadium

21 August 2022	Peyia 2014	0–4	Pafos	Pegeia
19:00 EET (UTC+2)		Report	Tavares; Semedo; Kharabadze; Al Ghaddioui	Stadium: Peyia Municipal Stadium

== Competitions ==
=== Overview ===
Competition	First match	Last match	Starting round	Final position	Record							
Competition	First match	Last match	Starting round	Final position	Pld	W	D	L	GF	GA	GD	Win %
Cyta Championship	28 August 2022	28 May 2023	Matchday 1	4th	36	17	12	7	60	30	+30	47.22
Cypriot Cup	5 October 2022	27 April 2023	First round	Semifinal	6	3	2	1	13	7	+6	50.00
Total					42	20	14	8	73	37	+36	47.62

Last updated: 28 May 2023
Source: Competitions

=== Cyta Championship ===
==== Regular season ====
===== League table =====
Pos	Team	Pld	W	D	L	GF	GA	GD	Pts	Qualification or relegation
2	AEK Larnaca	26	18	3	5	46	21	+25	57	Qualification for the Championship round
3	Aris Limassol	26	15	8	3	46	20	+26	53	Qualification for the Championship round
4	Pafos	26	14	8	4	48	20	+28	50	Qualification for the Championship round
5	Apollon Limassol	25	13	5	7	34	27	+7	44	Qualification for the Championship round
6	Omonia	26	13	2	11	37	28	+9	41	Qualification for the Championship round

Source: Cyprus Football Association
Rules for classification: 1) Points; 2) Head-to-head points; 3) Head-to-head goal difference; 4) Head-to-head goals scored; 5) Head-to-head away goals scored (only if two teams); 6) Goal difference; 7) Goals scored; 8) Play-off (only if deciding championship round, relegation round or relegation).

===== Results summary =====
Overall								Home						Away					
Pld	W	D	L	GF	GA	GD	Pts	W	D	L	GF	GA	GD	W	D	L	GF	GA	GD
26	14	8	4	48	21	+27	50	8	3	2	27	12	+15	6	5	2	21	9	+12

Last updated: 7 March 2023.
Source: Results

===== Results by results =====
Matchday	1	2	3	4	5	6	7	8	9	10	11	12	13	14	15	16	17	18	19	20	21	22	23	24	25	26
Ground	A	H	A	H	A	H	A	H	A	A	H	A	H	H	A	H	A	H	A	H	A	H	H	A	H	A
Result	D	W	W	W	D	W	W	W	W	W	W	D	D	L	W	W	L	D	W	W	D	L	W	L	D	D
Position	9	4	3	1	2	1	1	1	1	1	1	1	1	2	2	2	3	3	3	3	3	3	3	3	4	4

Updated to match(es) played on 7 March 2023. Source: Results
A = Away; H = Home; W = Win; D = Draw; L = Loss; P = Postponed

===== Results =====
28 August 2022 1	APOEL	1–1	Pafos	Strovolos
20:00 EEST (UTC+3)	Villafáñez (yellow card) 16'; Sušić 80'; Wheeler (yellow card) 89'; Crespo (yellow card) 90'	Report	Kané (yellow card) 22'; Jairo 35'; Dragomir (yellow card) 44'; Al Ghaddioui (yellow card) 72'; Bajrić (yellow card) 90'; Juninho (yellow card) 90+1'	Stadium: GSP Stadium; Referee: Constantinos Photiou

2 September 2022 2	Pafos	4–0	Karmiotissa	Paphos
20:00 EEST (UTC+3)	Valakari 12' (pen.); Tanković 45+6' (pen.); Kané 55'; Dragomir (yellow card) 62'; Semedo 90+3'	Report	Ďuriš (yellow card) 23'; Ben Sallam (yellow card) 28'; Kaltsas (yellow card) 33'	Stadium: Stelios Kyriakides Stadium; Referee: Panagiotis Hadjigeorghiou

10 September 2022 3	Akritas Chlorakas	0–4	Pafos	Chloraka
19:00 EEST (UTC+3)	Šehić (yellow card) 14'; Korac (yellow card) 53' (red card) 90+3'; Abraham (yellow card) 76'	Report	Tanković 30'; Jairo 65'; Juninho (yellow card) 71'; Dragomir 88'; Hestad (yellow card) 88'; Name 90+4'	Stadium: Chloraka Municipal Stadium; Referee: Konstantinos Fellas

18 September 2022 4	Pafos	1–0	AEK Larnaca	Paphos
19:00 EEST (UTC+3)	Kvída (yellow card) 6'; Bajrić (yellow card) 36'; Jairo 76'	Report	Pirić (yellow card) 6'; Altman (yellow card) 68'	Stadium: Stelios Kyriakides Stadium; Referee: Mario Christoforou

1 October 2022 5	Apollon Limassol	1–1	Pafos	Limassol
19:00 EEST (UTC+3)	Vá (yellow card) 43' (goal) 66'; Coll (yellow card) 49'; Henty (yellow card) 74'	Report	Jairo 38'; Kvída (yellow card) 44'	Stadium: Tsirio Stadium; Referee: Pablo Fuertes

8 October 2022 6	Pafos	3–0	Enosis Neon Paralimni	Paphos
19:00 EEST (UTC+3)	Jairo 11', 90+1'; Abdurahimi 90+3'	Report	Konstantinou (yellow card) 15'; D.Mavroudis (yellow card) 32'; F.Kotsonis (yellow card) 32'; Lucero (yellow card) 83'; Jevremović (yellow card) 90'	Stadium: Stelios Kyriakides Stadium; Referee: Dimitris Solomou

14 October 2022 7	Doxa Katokopias	0–3	Pafos	Peristerona
19:00 EEST (UTC+3)	Vallejo (yellow card) 87'	Report	Kané (yellow card) 34'; Valakari 44'; Semedo (yellow card) 76'; Abdurahimi 81'; Jairo 83'	Stadium: Katokopia Stadium; Referee: Antonio Menelaus

22 October 2022 8	Pafos	3–0	AC Omonia	Paphos
18:00 EEST (UTC+3)	Semedo 26', 64'; Valakari 60' (pen.)	Report	Bruno (yellow card) 6'	Stadium: Stelios Kyriakides Stadium; Referee: Andrea Colombo

29 October 2022 9	Nea Salamis Famagusta	0–2	Pafos	Larnaca
17:00 EEST (UTC+3)	Santos (yellow card) 23'; Margaça (yellow card) 36'; Mandjeck (yellow card) 89'; Sergiou (yellow card) 90+6'; Fragkou (yellow card) 90+13'; Adoni (yellow card) 90+14'; Dorregaray (yellow card) 90+14'	Report	Name 26'; Al Ghaddioui (yellow card) 65'; Antosch (yellow card) 86'; Ikoko (yellow card) 90+3'; Tanković (yellow card) 90+10'; Kvída (yellow card) 90+14'; Valakari 90+14'	Stadium: Ammochostos Stadium; Referee: Dimitris Solomou

6 November 2022 10	AEL Limassol	1–3	Pafos	Limassol
19:00 EET (UTC+2)	Santos (yellow card) 25'; Tshibola (yellow card) 42' (goal) 56'; Kačaniklić (yellow card) 74'	Report	Tanković 28' (pen.); Semedo 45+4'; Kané (yellow card) 65'; Teixeira 72' (o.g.)	Stadium: Tsirio Stadium; Referee: João Pinheiro

10 November 2022 11	Pafos	1–0	Anorthosis Famagusta	Paphos
19:00 EET (UTC+2)	Name 45+1'; Hočko (yellow card) 53'	Report	Haroyan (yellow card) 22'	Stadium: Stelios Kyriakides Stadium; Referee: Chrysovalantis Theouli

28 November 2022 12	Aris Limassol	2–2	Pafos	Limassol
19:00 EET (UTC+2)	Szöke (yellow card) 42'; Bengtsson 50'; Kokorin (yellow card) 53' (goal) 65' (pen.)	Report	Ikoko (yellow card) 37'; Kané (yellow card) 53'; Abdurahimi 57'; Jairo 79' (yellow card) 80'	Stadium: Tsirio Stadium; Referee: Antonio Menelaus

3 December 2022 13	Pafos	1–1	Olympiakos Nicosia	Paphos
19:00 EET (UTC+2)	Kvída (yellow card) 47'; Jairo 61'	Report	Pechlivanis (yellow card) 48'; T.Liasides (yellow card) 56'; Psychas 58'; O.Koroma (yellow card) 63'	Stadium: Stelios Kyriakides Stadium; Referee: Mario Antoniou

9 December 2022 14	Pafos	1–2	APOEL	Paphos
19:00 EET (UTC+2)	Kané (yellow card) 8' (yellow-red card) 61'; Dragomir (yellow card) 17'; Juninho 90+2'; Bajrić (yellow card) 90+4'; Kvída (yellow card) 90+5'	Report	Sušić 18', 48' (yellow card) 65'; Marquinhos (yellow card) 45'; Crespo (red card) 74'	Stadium: Stelios Kyriakides Stadium; Referee: Luca Pairetto

19 December 2022 15	Karmiotissa	0–1	Pafos	Limassol
19:00 EET (UTC+2)	Chadjivasilis (yellow card) 11'; Malone (yellow card) 60'; Ďuriš (yellow card) 64'	Report	Jairo 14' (yellow card) 90+1'; Juninho (yellow card) 20'; Tanković (yellow card) 78'	Stadium: Tsirio Stadium; Referee: Ioannis Christodoulou

23 December 2022 16	Pafos	5–2	Akritas Chlorakas	Paphos
16:30 EET (UTC+2)	Kvída 16'; Kané (yellow card) 17'; Valakari 40'; Jairo 67', 85'; Al Ghaddioui 90+3'	Report	Reginaldo 43' (yellow card) 48'; J.El Jemili 45+2'; Korac (yellow card) 58'; I.Pikis (yellow card) 74'	Stadium: Stelios Kyriakides Stadium; Referee: Thomas Hatzivassileiou

4 January 2023 17	AEK Larnaca	1–0	Pafos	Larnaca
19:00 EET (UTC+2)	Altman 15'; Sanjurjo (yellow card) 31'; Gustavo (yellow card) 53'; Mamas (yellow card) 90+5'; Romo (yellow card) 90+10'	Report	Kvída (yellow card) 85'; Dragomir (yellow card) 90+1'; Ikoko (yellow card) 90+10'	Stadium: AEK Arena – Georgios Karapatakis; Referee: Daniele Doveri

8 January 2022 18	Pafos	2–2	Apollon Limassol	Paphos
17:00 EET (UTC+2)	Jairo 4'; Juninho (yellow card) 20'; Name 72' (yellow card) 73'; Jefté (yellow card) 88'; Pelágio (yellow card) 88'	Report	Shahar 51' (pen.) (yellow card) 56'; Aleesami (yellow card) 72'; Roberge (yellow card) 73'; Peybernes (yellow card) 84' (yellow-red card) 90+9'; Pittas (yellow card) 90+1'; Khammas 90+9'	Stadium: Stelios Kyriakides Stadium; Referee: Chrysovalantis Theouli

13 January 2023 19	Enosis Neon Paralimni	0–2	Pafos	Paralimni
19:00 EET (UTC+2)	A.Katsiaris (yellow card) 31'; Dreksa (yellow card) 48'; P.Gavriel (yellow card) 77'; F.Kotsonis (yellow card) 83'; Silva (yellow card) 88'; Lucero (yellow card) 90+1'	Report	Jairo 44'; Name (yellow card) 60'; Tanković 90' (pen.) (yellow card) 90'	Stadium: Paralimni Stadium; Referee: Dimitris Solomou

21 January 2023 20	Pafos	3–1	Doxa Katokopias	Paphos
17:00 EET (UTC+2)	Jairo 13', 33'; Kané 63'	Report	B.Kovačević (yellow card) 32'; Bajrić 37' (o.g.)	Stadium: Stelios Kyriakides Stadium; Referee: Thomas Hatzivassileiou

29 January 2023 21	AC Omonia	0–0	Pafos	Nicosia
17:00 EET (UTC+2)	Bezus (yellow card) 38'; Cassamá (yellow card) 54'; Yuste (yellow card) 82'	Report	Hestad (yellow card) 78'; Juninho (yellow card) 81'	Stadium: GSP Stadium; Referee: Vitor Ferreira

3 February 2023 22	Pafos	1–2	Nea Salamis Famagusta	Paphos
17:30 EET (UTC+2)	Tanković 39'; Pelágio (yellow card) 64'	Report	Dorregaray 8' (pen.), (yellow card) 40'; Adoni (yellow card) 14'; Miguelito 48'; Carlitos (yellow card) 54'; Melissas (yellow card) 90+3'	Stadium: Stelios Kyriakides Stadium; Referee: Vítor Ferreira

8 February 2023 23	Pafos	1–0	AEL Limassol	Paphos
19:00 EET (UTC+2)	Tanković 78'; Valakari (yellow card) 90+5'	Report	D.Silva (yellow card) 89'; M.Kolias (yellow card) 90+7'	Stadium: Stelios Kyriakides Stadium; Referee: Antonio Menelaus

20 February 2023 24	Anorthosis Famagusta	2–1	Pafos	Larnaca
19:00 EET (UTC+2)	Guerrero 8'; Antoñín 14'; Baixinho (yellow card) 42'; Correia (yellow card) 75'; Christofi (yellow card) 82'; Ioannou (yellow card) 85'	Report	Bajrić (yellow card) 16'; Tanković 44' (pen.); Jairo (yellow card) 83'; Palacios (yellow card) 90+1'	Stadium: Antonis Papadopoulos Stadium; Referee: Chrysovalantis Theouli

24 February 2023 25	Pafos	1–1	Aris Limassol	Paphos
19:00 EET (UTC+2)	Tanković (yellow card) 34'; Jairo 70'; Valakari (yellow card) 90+8'	Report	Bengtsson (yellow card) 28'; Szöke 35' (yellow card) 45+1'; Struski (yellow card) 38'; Yago (yellow card) 90+5'	Stadium: Stelios Kyriakides Stadium; Referee: Ioannis Christodoulou

7 March 2023 26	Olympiakos Nicosia	1–1	Pafos	Nicosia
19:00 EET (UTC+2)	Psychas 45+4'; Koroma (yellow card) 52'; Dosis (yellow card) 85'	Report	Abdurahimi 23'; Kané (yellow card) 75'; Pelágio (yellow card) 90'; Tanković (yellow card) 90+3'	Stadium: Makario Stadium; Referee: Konstantinos Fellas

==== Championship round ====
===== League table =====
Pos	Team	Pld	W	D	L	GF	GA	GD	Pts	Qualification
1	Aris Limassol (C)	36	21	11	4	65	28	+37	74	Qualification for the Champions League second qualifying round
2	APOEL	36	20	11	5	52	26	+26	71	Qualification for the Europa Conference League second qualifying round
3	AEK Larnaca	36	20	6	10	55	37	+18	66	Qualification for the Europa Conference League second qualifying round
4	Pafos	36	17	12	7	60	30	+30	63	
5	Apollon Limassol	35	19	5	11	47	37	+10	62	
6	Omonia (Note: Cup winner)	36	15	4	17	43	42	+1	49	Qualification for the Europa Conference League second qualifying round

Source: Cyprus Football Association
Rules for classification: 1) Points; 2) Head-to-head points; 3) Head-to-head goal difference; 4) Head-to-head goals scored; 5) Head-to-head away goals scored (only if two teams); 6) Goal difference; 7) Goals scored; 8) Play-off (only if deciding championship round, relegation round or relegation).
(C) Champions

===== Results summary =====
Overall								Home						Away					
Pld	W	D	L	GF	GA	GD	Pts	W	D	L	GF	GA	GD	W	D	L	GF	GA	GD
10	3	4	3	12	10	+2	13	2	2	1	9	5	+4	1	2	2	3	5	−2

Last updated: 28 May 2023.
Source: Results

===== Results by results =====
Matchday	1	2	3	4	5	6	7	8	9	10
Ground	H	A	A	H	A	A	H	H	A	H
Result	D	D	L	W	W	L	D	L	D	W
Position	4	4	4	4	4	4	4	4	4	4

Updated to match(es) played on 28 May 2023. Source: Results
A = Away; H = Home; W = Win; D = Draw; L = Loss; P = Postponed

===== Results =====
12 March 2023 27	Pafos	2–2	Aris Limassol	Paphos
17:00 EET (UTC+2)	Valakari 25' (pen.), 81'; Pelágio (yellow card) 62'; Juninho (yellow card) 83'	Report	Kokorin 15' (pen.) (yellow card) 89'; Moucketou-Moussounda (yellow card) 33'; Bengtsson 45+2'; Yago (yellow card) 90+5'	Stadium: Stelios Kyriakides Stadium; Referee: Chrysovalantis Theouli

17 March 2023 28	APOEL	0–0	Pafos	Strovolos
19:00 EET (UTC+2)	Sušić (yellow card) 61'; Kvilitaia (yellow card) 90+1'	Report		Stadium: GSP Stadium; Referee: Mario Melero López

2 April 2023 29	AC Omonia	2–0	Pafos	Nicosia
18:00 EEST (UTC+3)	Ansarifard (yellow card) 38'; Biesiedin 55'; Yuste 83'	Report	Dragomir (yellow card) 35'	Stadium: GSP Stadium; Referee: Antonio Menelaus

11 April 2023 30	Pafos	4–0	AEK Larnaca	Paphos
19:00 EEST (UTC+3)	Abdurahimi 10', 23'; Ivušić (yellow card) 60'; Kvída (yellow card) 67'; Tanković 90'; Kané 90+4'	Report	Tomović (yellow card) 33'	Stadium: Stelios Kyriakides Stadium; Referee: Giovanni Ayroldi

21 April 2023 31	Apollon Limassol	0–1	Pafos	Limassol
19:00 EEST (UTC+3)	Warda (yellow card) 58'; Donyoh (yellow card) 85'	Report	Abdurahimi 25' (yellow card) 45+1'; Hočko (yellow card) 39'; Ikoko (yellow card) 45+2'; Kané (yellow card) 51' (yellow-red card) 72'; Palacios (yellow card) 90'; Kvída (yellow card) 90+6'	Stadium: Alphamega Stadium; Referee: Morten Hansen Krogh

1 May 2023 32	Aris Limassol	2–1	Pafos	Limassol
19:00 EEST (UTC+3)	Yago (yellow card) 19'; Kokorin (yellow card) 37' (goal) 84'; Babicka (yellow card) 45'; Gomis 61'; Špoljarić (yellow card) 78'; Szöke (yellow card) 90+3'	Report	Palacios (yellow card) 43'; Jairo 69'; Bajrić (yellow card) 90+3'	Stadium: Alphamega Stadium; Referee: Mikkel Redder

6 May 2023 33	Pafos	1–1	APOEL	Paphos
19:00 EEST (UTC+3)	Palacios 5' (yellow card) 76'; Juninho (yellow card) 18' (yellow-red card) 35'; Kané (yellow card) 84'	Report	Karo (yellow card) 4' (yellow-red card) 73'; Dvali 29'	Stadium: Stelios Kyriakides Stadium; Referee: Morten Hansen Krogh

13 May 2023 34	Pafos	0–1	AC Omonia	Paphos
19:30 EEST (UTC+3)	Ikoko (yellow card) 76'	Report	Lecjaks 35'; Matthews (yellow card) 57'; Kousoulos (yellow card) 83'	Stadium: Stelios Kyriakides Stadium; Referee: Jakob Alexander Sundberg

21 May 2023 35	AEK Larnaca	1–1	Pafos	Larnaca
19:00 EEST (UTC+3)	Lopes (yellow card) 45+3'; Ángel (yellow card) 49'; Trichkovski 90+3'	Report	Kvída 38'; Tanković (red card) 45+2'; Hočko (yellow card) 45+3'; Palacios (yellow card) 45+7'; Ikoko (yellow card) 45+8'	Stadium: AEK Arena – Georgios Karapatakis; Referee: Dario Bel

28 May 2023 36	Pafos	2–1	Apollon Limassol	Paphos
19:00 EEST (UTC+3)	Kané (yellow card) 43'; Abdurahimi 84'; Bruno 90+5' (yellow card) 90+7' (yellow-red card) 90+12'	Report	Pittas 35'; Iliev (yellow card) 45+5' (yellow-red card) 57'; Mavrias (yellow card) 50'; Demetriou (yellow card) 61'; Zinonos (yellow card) 88'	Stadium: Stelios Kyriakides Stadium; Referee: Juan Luca Sacchi

=== Cypriot Cup ===
5 October 2022 First Round	AEZ Zakakiou	0–3	Pafos	Limassol
18:00 EET (UTC+2)	Aristotelous (red card) 56'	Report	Hočko 34'; Al Ghaddioui 45'; Demetriou 48'	Stadium: Zakaki Community Stadium

17 January 2023 Second Round	Pafos	3–1	Akritas Chlorakas	Paphos
19:00 EET (UTC+2)	Abdurahimi 12'; Jairo 69'; Semedo 90'	Report	Lopes (yellow card) 11'; C.Karayiannis (yellow card) 20'; Šaravanja (yellow card) 57'; Perntreou (yellow card) 73'; Šehić (yellow card) 80'; Abraham 83'	Stadium: Stelios Kyriakides Stadium; Referee: Demetris Koumi

15 February 2023 Quarterfinal 1st leg	Doxa Katokopias	1–4	Pafos	Peristerona
18:00 EET (UTC+2)	Adénon 4'; Ojala (yellow card) 25'; Mesca (yellow card) 33'; F.Abdoullahi (yellow card) 53'; Anaane (yellow card) 85'	Report	Jefté 2'; Hočko 16'; Name 50'; Abdurahimi 62'	Stadium: Katokopia Stadium; Referee: Thomas Hadjivassiliou

28 February 2023 Quarterfinal 2nd leg	Pafos	1–1 (5–2 agg.)	Doxa Katokopias	Paphos
18:00 EET (UTC+2)	Hestad 18'	Report	Abdoullahi (yellow card) 45'; Trujić 84'	Stadium: Stelios Kyriakides Stadium; Referee: Demetris Solomou

6 April 2023 Semifinal 1st leg	Pafos	1–1	AC Omonia	Paphos
19:00 EEST (UTC+3)	Name (yellow card) 36'; Kvída (yellow card) 90'; Dragomir (yellow card) 90+1'; Jairo 90+3'	Report	Loizou 5'; Ansarifard (yellow card) 30'; Kousoulos (yellow card) 63'; Bezus (yellow card) 72' (yellow-red card) 84'	Stadium: Stelios Kyriakides Stadium; Referee: Rosario Abisso

26 April 2023 Semifinal 2nd leg	AC Omonia	3–1 (4–2 agg.)	Pafos	Nicosia
19:00 EEST (UTC+3)	Diskerud 34'; Yuste (yellow card) 76'; Cassamá 79'; Charalampous (yellow card) 90+5' (goal) 90+7'	Report	Valakari 13'; Ivušić (yellow card) 32'; Bajrić (yellow card) 32'; Hočko (yellow card) 83'; Kvída (yellow card) 85'; Palacios (yellow card) 90+3'	Stadium: GSP Stadium; Referee: Daniele Chiffi

== Squad statistics ==
As of match played 21 May 2023

=== Appearances and goals ===
No.	Pos	Nat	Player	Total		Cyta Championship		Cypriot Cup	
No.	Pos	Nat	Player	Apps	Goals	Apps	Goals	Apps	Goals
1	GK	(Spain) ESP	Oier Olazábal	3	0	1	0	2	0
2	DF	(Colombia) COL	Jeisson Palacios	20	1	13+3	1	4	0
4	DF	(Czech Republic) CZE	Josef Kvída	40	2	34	2	6	0
5	DF	(Georgia (country)) GEO	Levan Kharabadze	4	0	1+2	0	1	0
6	MF	(Montenegro) MNE	Deni Hočko	26	2	11+9	0	6	2
8	MF	(Guinea) GUI	Mamadou Kané	37	3	31+1	3	2+3	0
10	FW	(Brazil) BRA	Jairo	33	20	27+2	18	2+2	2
11	FW	(Spain) ESP	Jefté Betancor	12	1	1+7	0	3+1	1
13	DF	(Democratic Republic of the Congo) COD	Jordan Ikoko	36	0	31+1	0	4	0
14	DF	(Cyprus) CYP	Marios Demetriou	12	1	5+3	0	3+1	1
17	MF	(North Macedonia) MKD	Besart Abdurahimi	31	10	12+13	8	6	2
19	MF	(Norway) NOR	Eirik Hestad	25	1	8+14	0	2+1	1
20	DF	(Brazil) BRA	Juninho	36	1	31	1	3+2	0
22	FW	(Sweden) SWE	Muamer Tanković	36	8	30+2	8	1+3	0
23	DF	(Cyprus) CYP	Alexandros Michael	1	0	0+1	0	0	0
24	MF	(Finland) FIN	Onni Valakari	39	8	23+10	7	5+1	1
25	MF	(Senegal) SEN	Moustapha Name	27	5	13+9	4	3+2	1
26	GK	(Croatia) CRO	Ivica Ivušić	20	0	16	0	4	0
27	FW	(Brazil) BRA	Bruno Felipe	17	1	8+7	1	0+2	0
30	MF	(Romania) ROU	Vlad Dragomir	30	1	21+7	1	1+1	0
31	GK	(Austria) AUT	Daniel Antosch	19	0	19	0	0	0
33	DF	(Slovenia) SLO	Kenan Bajrić	38	0	35	0	3	0
49	MF	(Portugal) POR	Bruno Tavares	5	0	1+2	0	1+1	0
60	MF	(Portugal) POR	Pedro Pelágio	20	0	7+9	0	3+1	0
70	FW	(Cyprus) CYP	Lysandros Papastylianou	2	0	0+1	0	0+1	0
Players away on loan:
Players who appeared for Pafos but left during the season:
7	FW	(Cape Verde) CPV	Willy Semedo	20	5	17+1	4	1+1	1
9	FW	(Germany) GER	Hamadi Al Ghaddioui	10	2	0+9	1	1	1

=== Goal scorers ===
Place	Position	Nation	Number	Name	Cyta Championship	Cypriot Cup	Total
1	FW	(Brazil)	10	Jairo	18	2	20
2	MF	(North Macedonia)	17	Besart Abdurahimi	8	2	10
3	FW	(Sweden)	22	Muamer Tanković	8	0	8
3	MF	(Finland)	24	Onni Valakari	7	1	8
5	FW	(Cape Verde)	7	Willy Semedo	4	1	5
5	MF	(Senegal)	25	Moustapha Name	4	1	5
7	MF	(Guinea)	8	Mamadou Kané	3	0	3
8	DF	(Czech Republic)	4	Josef Kvída	2	0	2
8	FW	(Germany)	9	Hamadi Al Ghaddioui	1	1	2
8	MF	(Montenegro)	6	Deni Hočko	0	2	2
11	MF	(Romania)	30	Vlad Dragomir	1	0	1
11	DF	(Brazil)	20	Juninho	1	0	1
11	DF	(Colombia)	2	Jeisson Palacios	1	0	1
11	FW	(Brazil)	27	Bruno Felipe	1	0	1
11	DF	(Cyprus)	14	Marios Demetriou	0	1	1
11	FW	(Spain)	11	Jefté Betancor	0	1	1
11	MF	(Norway)	19	Eirik Hestad	0	1	1
11				Own goal	1	0	1
Total					60	13	73

=== Clean sheets ===
Place	Position	Nation	Number	Name	Cyta Championship	Cypriot Cup	Total
1	GK	(Austria)	31	Daniel Antosch	10	0	10
2	GK	(Croatia)	26	Ivica Ivušić	5	0	5
3	GK	(Spain)	1	Oier Olazábal	0	1	1
TOTALS					15	1	16

=== Disciplinary record ===
Number	Nation	Position	Name	Cyta Championship		Cypriot Cup		Total	
Number	Nation	Position	Name	Booked	Sent off (straight red)	Booked	Sent off (straight red)	Booked	Sent off (straight red)
2	(Colombia)	DF	Jeisson Palacios	5	0	1	0	6	0
4	(Czech Republic)	DF	Josef Kvída	8	0	2	0	10	0
6	(Montenegro)	MF	Deni Hočko	3	0	1	0	4	0
8	(Guinea)	MF	Mamadou Kané	12	2	0	0	12	2
10	(Brazil)	FW	Jairo	3	0	0	0	3	0
11	(Spain)	FW	Jefté Betancor	1	0	0	0	1	0
13	(Democratic Republic of the Congo)	DF	Jordan Ikoko	6	0	0	0	6	0
17	(North Macedonia)	MF	Besart Abdurahimi	1	0	0	0	1	0
19	(Norway)	MF	Eirik Hestad	2	0	0	0	2	0
20	(Brazil)	DF	Juninho	8	1	0	0	8	1
22	(Sweden)	FW	Muamer Tanković	5	1	0	0	5	1
24	(Finland)	MF	Onni Valakari	2	0	0	0	2	0
25	(Senegal)	MF	Moustapha Name	2	0	1	0	3	0
26	(Croatia)	GK	Ivica Ivušić	1	0	1	0	2	0
27	(Brazil)	FW	Bruno Felipe	1	0	0	0	1	0
30	(Romania)	MF	Vlad Dragomir	5	0	1	0	6	0
31	(Austria)	GK	Daniel Antosch	1	0	0	0	1	0
33	(Slovenia)	DF	Kenan Bajrić	5	0	1	0	6	0
60	(Portugal)	MF	Pedro Pelágio	4	0	0	0	4	0
Players away on loan:
Players who left Pafos during the season:
7	(Cape Verde)	FW	Willy Semedo	1	0	0	0	1	0
9	(Germany)	FW	Hamadi Al Ghaddioui	2	0	0	0	2	0
Total				79	5	8	0	87	5
