= 2021–22 Pafos FC season =

Pafos
2021–22 season
- Owner: Pavel Gognidze
- Manager: Darko Milanič (until 10 May); Míchel Salgado (Acting Head Coach) (from 14 May)
- Stadium: Stelios Kyriakides Stadium
- Cyta Championship: 6th
- Cypriot Cup: Second Round vs Anorthosis Famagusta
- Top goalscorer: League: Onni Valakari (10); All: Onni Valakari (11)
Home colours	Away colours

The 2021–22 season was Pafos's 8th year in existence, and fifth season in the Cypriot First Division.

== Season review ==
On 21 June, Pafos announced the signing of Jeisson Palacios from Santa Fe, with Willy Semedo to a two-year contract from Grenoble the following day and Douglas Aurélio joining from Estoril Praia on 23 June.

On 29 June, Pafos announced the signing of Bruno Leite from Haugesund, with the transfer becoming official on 1 August.

On 30 June, Darko Milanič was appointed as Pafos' new Head Coach.

On 14 July, Pafos announced the signing of Deni Hočko from Mouscron for an undisclosed fee.

On 23 July, Pafos announced the signing of Kenan Bajrić on a season-long loan deal from Slovan Bratislava.

On 27 July, Pafos announced the signing of Daniel Antosch from Liefering.

On 29 July, Pafos announced the signing of Franko Kovačević from Hoffenheim II.

On 3 August, Pafos announced the signing of Martin Pajić from HNK Šibenik.

On 16 August, Pafos announced the signing of Magomedkhabib Abdusalamov from Rodina Moscow.

On 19 August, Pafos announced the signing of Jairo from Hajduk Split.

On 24 August, Pafos announced the signing of Ailton from Midtjylland.

On 27 August, Pafos announced the signing of Demetris Moulazimis from Enosis Neon Paralimni.

On 30 August, Pafos announced the signing of Vlad Dragomir from Virtus Entella.

On 7 September, Edgar Babayan left Riga by mutual consent before signing for Pafos.

On 7 January, Pafos announced the signing of Talys on loan from NK Osijek for the remainder of season.

On 9 January, Pafos announced the signing of Eirik Hestad on a free transfer after his Molde contract had expired.

On 14 January, Pafos announced the signing of Hamadi Al Ghaddioui from VfB Stuttgart for an undisclosed fee.

On 27 January, Pafos announced the signing of Ivan Tomečak from Rijeka, and the departure of Edgar Babayan.

On 10 May, Darko Milanič was relieved of his duties as Head Coach with immediate affect, with Technical Advisor Míchel Salgado being appointed as Acting Head Coach for the remaining two games of the season on 14 May.

== Squad ==
As of match played 22 May 2022

No.	Name	Nationality	Position	Date of birth (age)	Signed from	Signed in	Contract ends	Apps.	Goals
Goalkeepers
1	Artur Rudko	(Ukraine)	GK	7 May 1992 (aged 30)	Dynamo Kyiv	2019	2022	93	0
12	Evgenios Petrou	(Cyprus)	GK	6 September 1997 (aged 24)	Ethnikos Assia	2018		14	0
31	Daniel Antosch	(Austria)	GK	7 March 2000 (aged 22)	Liefering	2021		2	0
Defenders
2	Jeisson Palacios	(Colombia)	DF	20 March 1994 (aged 28)	Santa Fe	2021		13	1
4	Josef Kvída	(Czech Republic)	DF	16 January 1997 (aged 25)	NEC Nijmegen	2020		56	2
20	João Aurélio	(Portugal)	DF	17 August 1988 (aged 33)	Moreirense	2020		58	1
23	Alexandros Michael	(Cyprus)	DF	28 January 2000 (aged 22)	Karmiotissa	2021		8	0
27	Talys	(Brazil)	DF	10 February 1999 (aged 23)	loan from NK Osijek	2022		18	0
33	Kenan Bajrić	(Slovenia)	DF	20 December 1994 (aged 27)	loan from Slovan Bratislava	2021		32	0
44	Ivan Tomečak	(Croatia)	DF	7 December 1989 (aged 32)	on loan from Rijeka	2022		14	0
50	Demetris Moulazimis	(Cyprus)	DF	15 January 1992 (aged 30)	Enosis Neon Paralimni	2021		0	0
55	Martin Pajić	(Croatia)	DF	11 November 1999 (aged 22)	HNK Šibenik	2021		18	0
Midfielders
6	Deni Hočko	(Montenegro)	MF	22 April 1994 (aged 28)	Mouscron	2021		16	0
16	Bruno Leite	(Cape Verde)	MF	26 March 1995 (aged 27)	Haugesund	2021		4	0
19	Eirik Hestad	(Norway)	MF	26 June 1995 (aged 26)	Molde	2022		10	0
21	Gerasimos Fylaktou	(Cyprus)	MF	24 July 1991 (aged 30)	Ermis Aradippou	2019	2022(+1)		
24	Onni Valakari	(Finland)	MF	18 August 1999 (aged 22)	Tromsø	2020		72	31
25	Navarone Foor	(Netherlands)	MF	4 February 1992 (aged 30)	Al-Ittihad Kalba	2020		64	1
28	Stefan Panić	(Serbia)	MF	20 September 1992 (aged 29)	Riga	2020		50	3
30	Vlad Dragomir	(Romania)	MF	24 April 1999 (aged 23)	Virtus Entella	2021		27	1
42	Jason Puncheon (Vice-captain)	(England)	MF	18 June 1986 (aged 35)	Crystal Palace	2019	2022	71	5
58	Pavlos Charidimou	(Cyprus)	MF	14 September 2001 (aged 20)	Academy	2020		0	0
73	Manolis Charalambous	(Cyprus)	MF	1 April 2003 (aged 19)	Academy	2020		0	0
86	Alexandros Spontas	(Cyprus)	MF	27 November 2002 (aged 19)	Academy	2020		4	0
	Vá	(Angola)	MF	24 April 1998 (aged 24)	Petro de Luanda	2019		43	7
Forwards
7	Willy Semedo	(Cape Verde)	FW	27 April 1994 (aged 28)	Grenoble	2021	2023	28	4
8	Franko Kovačević	(Croatia)	FW	8 August 1999 (aged 22)	Hoffenheim II	2021		28	1
9	Kévin Bérigaud	(France)	FW	9 May 1988 (aged 34)	Montpellier	2018	2022		
10	Jairo	(Brazil)	FW	6 May 1992 (aged 30)	Hajduk Split	2021		32	8
11	Rushian Hepburn-Murphy	(England)	FW	28 August 1998 (aged 23)	Aston Villa	2020		23	5
14	Douglas Aurélio	(Brazil)	FW	27 March 1999 (aged 23)	Estoril Praia	2021		24	4
18	Magomedkhabib Abdusalamov	(Russia)	FW	1 May 2003 (aged 19)	Rodina Moscow	2021		18	3
22	Hamadi Al Ghaddioui	(Germany)	FW	22 September 1990 (aged 31)	VfB Stuttgart	2022		13	3
33	Lysandros Papastylianou	(Cyprus)	FW	29 November 2005 (aged 16)	Academy	2021		1	0
	Martinos Zinonos	(Cyprus)	FW	30 January 2001 (aged 21)	Academy	2020		0	0
	Michalis Mavrommatis	(Cyprus)	FW	5 April 2002 (aged 20)	Academy	2020		0	0
Out on loan
3	Ailton	(Brazil)	DF	16 March 1995 (aged 27)	Midtjylland	2021		6	0
5	Kyriakos Antoniou	(Cyprus)	DF	3 May 2001 (aged 21)	Academy	2018		31	1
	Marcelo Torres	(Argentina)	FW	6 November 1997 (aged 24)	Boca Juniors	2020		36	9
Left during the season
17	Edgar Babayan	(Armenia)	MF	28 October 1995 (aged 26)	Riga	2021		6	0

=== Out on loan ===
Note: Flags indicate national team as defined under FIFA eligibility rules; some limited exceptions apply. Players may hold more than one non-FIFA nationality.

No.	Pos.	Nation	Player
—	DF	BRA	Ailton (at Náutico until 30 June 2022)
—	DF	CYP	Kyriakos Antoniou (at Akritas Chlorakas until 30 June 2022)
—	FW	ARG	Marcelo Torres (at Akritas Chlorakas until 30 June 2022)

=== Left club during season ===
Note: Flags indicate national team as defined under FIFA eligibility rules; some limited exceptions apply. Players may hold more than one non-FIFA nationality.

No.	Pos.	Nation	Player
17	MF	ARM	Edgar Babayan (to Vejle)

== Transfers ==
=== In ===
Date	Position	Nationality	Name	From	Fee	Ref.
21 June 2021	DF	(Colombia)	Jeisson Palacios	Santa Fe	Undisclosed	
22 June 2021	FW	(Cape Verde)	Willy Semedo	Grenoble	Undisclosed	
23 June 2021	FW	(Brazil)	Douglas Aurélio	Estoril Praia	Undisclosed	
29 June 2021†	MF	(Cape Verde)	Bruno Leite	Haugesund	Undisclosed	
7 July 2021	MF	(Montenegro)	Deni Hočko	Mouscron	Undisclosed	
27 July 2021	GK	(Austria)	Daniel Antosch	Liefering	Undisclosed	
29 July 2021	FW	(Croatia)	Franko Kovačević	Hoffenheim II	Undisclosed	
3 August 2021	DF	(Croatia)	Martin Pajić	HNK Šibenik	Undisclosed	
16 August 2021	FW	(Russia)	Magomedkhabib Abdusalamov	Rodina Moscow	Undisclosed	
19 August 2021	FW	(Brazil)	Jairo	Hajduk Split	Undisclosed	
24 August 2021	DF	(Brazil)	Ailton	Midtjylland	Undisclosed	
27 August 2021	DF	(Cyprus)	Demetris Moulazimis	Enosis Neon Paralimni	Undisclosed	
30 August 2021	MF	(Romania)	Vlad Dragomir	Virtus Entella	Undisclosed	
7 September 2021	MF	(Armenia)	Edgar Babayan	Riga	Free	
9 January 2022	MF	(Norway)	Eirik Hestad	Molde	Free	
14 January 2022	FW	(Germany)	Hamadi Al Ghaddioui	VfB Stuttgart	Undisclosed	

† Leite's move was announced on the above date, but was not finalised until 1 August 2021.

=== Loans in ===
Start date	Position	Nationality	Name	From	End date	Ref.
24 July 2021	DF	(Slovenia)	Kenan Bajrić	Slovan Bratislava	End of season	
7 January 2022	DF	(Brazil)	Talys	NK Osijek	End of season	
27 January 2022	DF	(Croatia)	Ivan Tomečak	Rijeka	End of season	

=== Out ===
Date	Position	Nationality	Name	To	Fee	Ref.
17 July 2021	GK	(Cyprus)	Andreas Theokli	Digenis Akritas Morphou	Undisclosed	
3 August 2021	GK	(England)	Will Mannion	Cambridge United	Undisclosed	

=== Loans out ===
Start date	Position	Nationality	Name	To	End date	Ref.
9 January 2022	FW	(Argentina)	Marcelo Torres	Akritas Chlorakas	End of season	
12 January 2022	DF	(Cyprus)	Kyriakos Antoniou	Akritas Chlorakas	End of season	
12 April 2021	DF	(Brazil)	Ailton	Náutico	30 June 2022	

=== Released ===
Date	Position	Nationality	Name	Joined	Date	Ref
27 January 2022	MF	(Armenia)	Edgar Babayan	Vejle	26 January 2022	
11 June 2022†	DF	(Portugal)	João Aurélio	Nacional	1 July 2022	
30 June 2022†	MF	(Serbia)	Stefan Panić	RFS	1 July 2022	
30 June 2022	GK	(Ukraine)	Artur Rudko	Metalist Kharkiv		
30 June 2022	DF	(Brazil)	Ailton	Rodina Moscow	20 September 2022	
30 June 2022	DF	(Croatia)	Martin Pajić	HNK Šibenik		
30 June 2022	DF	(Cyprus)	Demetris Moulazimis	Ayia Napa		
30 June 2022	MF	(Angola)	Vá	Apollon Limassol		
30 June 2022	MF	(Cyprus)	Manolis Charalambous			
30 June 2022	MF	(Cyprus)	Pavlos Charidimou	ASIL Lysi		
30 June 2022	MF	(England)	Jason Puncheon	Anorthosis Famagusta		
30 June 2022	FW	(England)	Rushian Hepburn-Murphy	Swindon Town	1 September 2022	
30 June 2022	FW	(France)	Kévin Bérigaud			
30 June 2022	FW	(Cyprus)	Pavlos Charidimou	AEZ Zakakiou		

† Transfers were announced on the above date, but didn't come into effect until 1 July 2022 once their contracts expired on 30 June 2022.

== Friendlies ==
11 July 2021	Pafos (Cyprus)	0–1	(Germany) Borussia Dortmund II	Schwaz, Austria
17:00 EEST (UTC+3)		Report		Stadium: Schwaz Hammers Stadium

16 July 2021	Pafos (Cyprus)	1–0	(Czech Republic) Dynamo České Budějovice	Schwaz, Austria
16:00 EEST (UTC+3)		Report		Stadium: Schwaz Hammers Stadium

24 July 2021	Pafos (Cyprus)	1–0	(Spain) CD Lugo	Spain
20:00 EEST (UTC+3)		Report

28 July 2021	Pafos (Cyprus)	2–0	(Spain) Coruxo	Spain
21:00 EEST (UTC+3)		Report

31 July 2021	Pafos (Cyprus)	0–2	(Spain) Celta de Vigo	Spain
12:30 EEST (UTC+3)		Report

4 August 2021	Pafos (Cyprus)	0–0	(Spain) Berço SC	Spain
19:00 EEST (UTC+3)		Report

11 August 2021	Pafos	2–0	Akritas Chlorakas	Paphos
18:30 EEST (UTC+3)	Kvída 12'; M.Jovanovic 46'	Report		Stadium: Stelios Kyriakides Stadium

14 August 2021	Pafos	1–1	Aris Limassol	Paphos
20:00 EEST (UTC+3)		Report		Stadium: Stelios Kyriakides Stadium

26 August 2021	Pafos	3–1	Karmiotissa	Paphos
19:00 EEST (UTC+3)	Jairo; Panić; Georgiou	Report	Goal	Stadium: Stelios Kyriakides Stadium

28 August 2021	Apollon Limassol	1–2	Pafos	Limassol
19:00 EEST (UTC+3)	Goal	Report	Aurélio; Jairo	Stadium: Tsirio Stadium

== Competitions ==
=== Overview ===
Competition	First match	Last match	Starting round	Final position	Record							
Competition	First match	Last match	Starting round	Final position	Pld	W	D	L	GF	GA	GD	Win %
Cyta Championship	21 August 2021	22 May 2022	Matchday 1	6th	32	11	13	8	39	30	+9	34.38
Cypriot Cup	22 September 2021	3 February 2022	First round	Second round	3	1	1	1	2	3	−1	33.33
Total					35	12	14	9	41	33	+8	34.29

Last updated: 22 May 2022
Source: Competitions

=== Cyta Championship ===
==== Regular season ====
===== League table =====
Pos	Team	Pld	W	D	L	GF	GA	GD	Pts	Qualification or relegation
4	Anorthosis Famagusta	22	11	5	6	36	26	+10	38	Qualification for the Championship round
5	Aris Limassol	22	10	6	6	23	20	+3	36	Qualification for the Championship round
6	Pafos	22	8	10	4	27	19	+8	34	Qualification for the Championship round
7	Omonia	22	9	4	9	25	25	0	31	Qualification for the Relegation round
8	AEL Limassol	22	7	4	11	26	28	−2	25	Qualification for the Relegation round

Source: Cyprus Football Association
Rules for classification: 1) Points; 2) Head-to-head points; 3) Head-to-head goal difference; 4) Head-to-head goals scored; 5) Head-to-head away goals scored (only if two teams); 6) Goal difference; 7) Goals scored; 8) Play-off (only if deciding championship round, relegation round or relegation).

===== Results summary =====
Overall								Home						Away					
Pld	W	D	L	GF	GA	GD	Pts	W	D	L	GF	GA	GD	W	D	L	GF	GA	GD
22	8	10	4	26	18	+8	34	4	6	1	15	6	+9	4	4	3	11	12	−1

Last updated: 25 February 2022.
Source: Results

===== Results by results =====
Matchday	1	2	3	4	5	6	7	8	9	10	11	12	13	14	15	16	17	18	19	20	21	22
Ground	H	A	H	A	H	H	A	H	A	H	A	A	H	A	H	A	H	A	H	A	A	H
Result	W	L	D	D	D	D	L	W	L	W	D	D	W	W	D	W	L	W	D	W	D	D
Position	1	8	8	5	7	6	8	6	8	6	5	6	4	4	5	4	5	4	5	5	6	6

Updated to match(es) played on 25 February 2022. Source: Results
A = Away; H = Home; W = Win; D = Draw; L = Loss; P = Postponed

===== Results =====
21 August 2021 1	Pafos	4–0	APOEL	Paphos
19:00 EEST (UTC+3)	Semedo 2', 45+3' (yellow card) 45+4'; Panić (yellow card) 18'; Valakari 45+1' (pen.), 62'	Report	Daushvili (yellow card) 35'	Stadium: Stelios Kyriakides Stadium; Referee: Chrysovalantis Theouli

13 September 2021 2	AEL Limassol	4–0	Pafos	Limassol
20:00 EEST (UTC+3)	Šćepović 8', 37'; Bruno Santos (yellow card) 22'; Ristevski (yellow card) 26'; Euller 50'; Riera (yellow card) 62'; Mazurek 75'	Report		Stadium: Tsirio Stadium; Referee: Nikolas Neokleous

18 September 2021 3	Pafos	1–1	AEK Larnaca	Paphos
18:00 EEST (UTC+3)	Panić (yellow card) 6'; A.Michael (yellow card) 35'; Dragomir 59' (yellow card) 80'; Kvída (yellow card) 75'	Report	Mamas (yellow card) 1'; Gyurcsó (yellow card) 35'; Trichkovski 52'	Stadium: Stelios Kyriakides Stadium; Referee: Chrysovalantis Theouli

26 September 2021 4	AC Omonia	1–1	Pafos	Strovolos
19:00 EEST (UTC+3)	A.Michael 55' (o.g.)	Report	Semedo 16' (yellow card) 58'; A.Michael (yellow card) 85'; Kvída (yellow card) 88'	Stadium: GSP Stadium; Referee: Marios Christoforou

2 October 2021 5	Pafos	1–1	Doxa Katokopias	Paphos
19:00 EEST (UTC+3)	Panić (yellow card) 19'; M.Pajić (yellow card) 25'; Dragomir (yellow card) 63'; J.Aurélio (yellow card) 65'; Jairo 67'; Bajrić (yellow card) 84'	Report	Ebralidze 28'; Adamović (yellow card) 35'; B.Kovačević (yellow card) 53'	Stadium: Stelios Kyriakides Stadium; Referee: Anastasis Anastasi

16 October 2021 6	Pafos	1–1	Olympiakos Nicosia	Paphos
19:00 EEST (UTC+3)	Valakari 53'; Jairo (yellow card) 60'; J.Aurélio (yellow card) 76'; M.Pajić (yellow card) 76'; Fylaktou (yellow card) 89'	Report	E.Kyriacou (yellow card) 38'; F.Eftychidis 90'	Stadium: Stelios Kyriakides Stadium; Referee: Giorgos Nikolaou

23 October 2021 7	Apollon Limassol	2–0	Pafos	Limassol
19:00 EEST (UTC+3)	Katelaris (yellow card) 33'; Pittas 50'; Albanis 63'	Report	Panić (yellow card) 20' (yellow-red card) 44'	Stadium: Tsirio Stadium; Referee: Demetris Solomou

1 November 2021 8	Pafos	2–0	PAEEK	Paphos
19:00 EET (UTC+2)	Valakari 41', 86' (pen.); Jairo (yellow card) 45+6'; Kvída (yellow card) 60'	Report	Enoh (yellow card) 45+3'; Kouros (yellow card) 58'	Stadium: Stelios Kyriakides Stadium; Referee: Kyriakos Christodoulou

7 November 2021 9	Anorthosis Famagusta	1–0	Pafos	Larnaca
17:00 EET (UTC+2)	Kaltsas 43'; Artymatas (yellow card) 64'	Report	Dragomir (yellow card) 42'; Puncheon (yellow card) 85'	Stadium: Antonis Papadopoulos Stadium; Referee: Marios Christoforou

20 November 2021 10	Pafos	3–0	Ethnikos Achna	Paphos
19:00 EET (UTC+2)	Jairo (yellow card) 28'; M.Abdusalamov 34', 54'; Semedo 39'; Puncheon (yellow card) 47'	Report	Ioannou (yellow card) 26'; Eloundou (yellow card) 42'; Hall (yellow card) 44'; M.Peratikos (yellow card) 53'; Khudobyak (yellow card) 66'	Stadium: Stelios Kyriakides Stadium; Referee: Constantinos Photiou

27 November 2021 11	Aris Limassol	3–0	Pahos	Limassol
17:00 EET (UTC+2)	Monnet-Paquet (yellow card) 24'; Frangos (yellow card) 55'; Sikorski (yellow card) 65'	Report	Panić (yellow card) 80'	Stadium: Tsirio Stadium; Referee: Kyriakos Christodoulou

5 December 2021 12	APOEL	1–1	Pafos	Nicosia
17:00 EET (UTC+2)	Savić (yellow card) 23'; Lundemo (yellow card) 47'; Léo Natel 79' (pen.)	Report	M.Pajić (yellow card) 25'; Bajrić (yellow card) 60'; A.Michael (yellow card) 70'; D.Aurélio 88'; Jairo (yellow card) 90'	Stadium: GSP Stadium; Referee: Chrysovalantis Theouli

10 December 2021 13	Pafos	1–0	AEL Limassol	Paphos
19:00 EET (UTC+2)	Valakari 5'; Foor (yellow card) 17'; J.Aurélio (yellow card) 89'	Report	Antoniou (yellow card) 27'; Majdevac (yellow card) 28'; Mazurek (yellow card) 34'	Stadium: Stelios Kyriakides Stadium; Referee: Menelaos Antoniou

20 December 2021 14	AEK Larnaca	1–3	Pafos	Larnaca
19:00 EET (UTC+2)	Thandi 11'; I.Toumbas (yellow card) 45+1'; Rosales (yellow card) 90+3'	Report	M.Abdusalamov 16'; J.Aurélio (yellow card) 34'; Valakari 36'; Panić 38' (yellow card) 66'; Semedo (yellow card) 45+1'; Foor (yellow card) 45+1'; Hočko (yellow card) 85'	Stadium: AEK Arena; Referee: Giorgos Nikolaou

5 January 2022 15	Pafos	1–1	AC Omonia	Paphos
17:00 EET (UTC+2)	Panić (yellow card) 11'; Valakari 19'; Kvída (red card) 39'	Report	Gómez 90+4'	Stadium: Stelios Kyriakides Stadium; Referee: Giorgos Nikolaou

15 January 2022 17	Olympiakos Nicosia	1–2	Pafos	Nicosia
17:00 EET (UTC+2)	Charalambous 33'; Sambinha (yellow card) 65'	Report	Kovačević 16'; Talys (yellow card) 30' Palacios (yellow card) 45+1'; Jairo 53'; Panić (yellow card) 56'; Dragomir (yellow card) 90+4'	Stadium: GSP Stadium; Referee: Nikolas Neokleous

22 January 2022 18	Pafos	0–1	Apollon Limassol	Paphos
17:00 EET (UTC+2)	Kovačević (yellow card) 17' (yellow-red card) 36'; Jairo (yellow card) 89'	Report	Mavrias (yellow card) 34'; Janga (yellow card) 39'; Pittas 85'	Stadium: Stelios Kyriakides Stadium; Referee: Menelaos Antoniou

28 January 2022 19	PAEEK	0–2	Pafos	Lakatamia
19:00 EET (UTC+2)	Obanor (yellow card) 45+1'; Neofytou (yellow card) 87'	Report	Al Ghaddioui 39'; Kvída (yellow card) 42'; Puncheon (yellow card) 60'; Jairo 69'	Stadium: Keryneia Epistrophi; Referee: Chrysovalantis Theouli

6 February 2022 20	Pafos	1–1	Anorthosis Famagusta	Paphos
16:00 EET (UTC+2)	Valakari 17' (pen.) (red card) 22'; Bajrić (yellow card) 19'; Semedo (yellow card) 75'; Puncheon (yellow card) 81'; Talys (yellow card) 81'; Hočko (yellow card) 90+1'	Report	Arajuuri (yellow card) 5'; Deletić 10' (yellow card) 11'; Hambardzumyan (yellow card) 17'; Avraam (yellow card) 80'; Correa (yellow card) 87'	Stadium: Stelios Kyriakides Stadium; Referee: Menelaos Antoniou

13 February 2022 21	Ethnikos Achna	0–1	Pafos	Achna
19:00 EET (UTC+2)	Wojtkowski (yellow card) 47'	Report	Jairo (yellow card) 5'; Panić 32'; Hočko (yellow card) 35'; Tomečak (yellow card) 85'	Stadium: Dasaki Stadium; Referee: Marios Christoforou

18 February 2022 16	Doxa Katokopias	1–1	Pafos	Nicosia
17:00 EET (UTC+2)	Avto 23'; Benny (yellow card) 50'; Adénon (yellow card) 72' (yellow-red card) 90+9'; Benjamín (yellow card) 90'; Sadik (yellow card) 90+7'	Report	J.Aurélio (yellow card) 3'; Palacios 74'	Stadium: Makario Stadium; Referee: Constantinos Photiou
Note: Match originally scheduled for 10 January, but postponed on 10 January due to COVID-19 cases within the Pafos squad.

25 February 2022 22	Pafos	1–1	Aris Limassol	Paphos
19:00 EET (UTC+2)	Puncheon (yellow card) 31'; Al Ghaddioui 75'; Panić (yellow card) 79'	Report	Sikorski 31' (pen.); Brown (yellow card) 49'; Roncaglia (yellow card) 68'; Moucketou-Moussounda (yellow card) 88'	Stadium: Stelios Kyriakides Stadium; Referee: Marios Christoforou

==== Championship round ====
===== League table =====
Pos	Team	Pld	W	D	L	GF	GA	GD	Pts	Qualification
1	Apollon Limassol (C)	32	16	10	6	50	33	+17	58	Qualification for the Champions League third qualifying round
2	AEK Larnaca	32	14	12	6	44	29	+15	54	Qualification for the Champions League second qualifying round
3	APOEL	32	14	10	8	48	41	+7	52	Qualification for the Europa Conference League second qualifying round
4	Aris Limassol	32	13	11	8	37	32	+5	50	Qualification for the Europa Conference League second qualifying round
5	Anorthosis Famagusta	32	13	10	9	48	40	+8	49	
6	Pafos	32	11	13	8	39	30	+9	46	

Updated to match(es) played on 22 May 2022. Source: Cyprus Football Association
Rules for classification: 1) Points; 2) Head-to-head points; 3) Head-to-head goal difference; 4) Head-to-head goals scored; 5) Head-to-head away goals scored (only if two teams); 6) Goal difference; 7) Goals scored; 8) Play-off (only if deciding championship round, relegation round or relegation).
(C) Champions

===== Results summary =====
Overall								Home						Away					
Pld	W	D	L	GF	GA	GD	Pts	W	D	L	GF	GA	GD	W	D	L	GF	GA	GD
10	3	3	4	12	11	+1	12	2	3	0	8	4	+4	1	0	4	4	7	−3

Last updated: 22 May 2022.
Source: Results

===== Results by results =====
Matchday	1	2	3	4	5	6	7	8	9	10
Ground	H	A	H	H	A	A	H	A	A	H
Result	D	L	D	W	L	W	D	L	L	W
Position	6	6	6	6	6	6	6	6	6	6

Updated to match(es) played on 22 May 2022. Source: Results
A = Away; H = Home; W = Win; D = Draw; L = Loss; P = Postponed

===== Results =====
7 March 2022 23	Pafos	0–0	Apollon Limassol	Paphos
18:00 EET (UTC+2)	Puncheon (yellow card) 42'	Report	Mavrias (yellow card) 51'; Diguiny (yellow card) 90+3'	Stadium: Stelios Kyriakides Stadium; Referee: Marios Christoforou

12 March 2022 24	Aris Limassol	2–1	Pafos	Limassol
19:00 EET (UTC+2)	Stępiński 21', 45'; Schildenfeld (yellow card) 66'; Delmiro (yellow card) 82'; Kvashuk (yellow card) 89'	Report	Aurélio 81'; Kvída (yellow card) 82'	Stadium: Tsirio Stadium; Referee: Nikolas Neokleous

19 March 2022 25	Pafos	2–2	Anorthosis Famagusta	Paphos
19:00 EET (UTC+2)	Aurélio 7'; Al Ghaddioui (yellow card) 22'; Kovačević (yellow card) 33'; Aurélio (yellow card) 83'; Jairo 90+1'	Report	Christofi 58' (pen.); Hambardzumyan (yellow card) 72'; Arajuuri (yellow card) 82'; Christodoulopoulos 90+7'	Stadium: Stelios Kyriakides Stadium; Referee: Nikolas Neokleous

4 April 2022 26	Pafos	2–0	AEK Larnaca	Paphos
19:00 EEST (UTC+3)	Aurélio 42'; Al Ghaddioui (yellow card) 71'; Puncheon 83'; Jairo (yellow card) 89'; Bajrić (yellow card) 90+1'	Report	Altman (yellow card) 27'; Ledes (yellow card) 57'; Tomović (yellow card) 81'; Thandi (yellow card) 90+5'	Stadium: Stelios Kyriakides Stadium; Referee: Chrysovalantis Theouli

10 April 2022 27	APOEL	2–1	Pafos	Nicosia
17:00 EEST (UTC+3)	Okriashvili (yellow card) 4'; Ndongala 66'; Karo (yellow card) 81'; Zabala 90+2'	Report	Puncheon (yellow card) 54'; Al Ghaddioui (yellow card) 60'; Valakari 83' (yellow card) 88'	Stadium: GSP Stadium; Referee: Giorgos Nikolaou

16 April 2022 28	Apollon Limassol	0–2	Pafos	Limassol
19:00 EEST (UTC+3)	Roberge (yellow card) 48'; Mavrias (yellow card) 67'	Report	Bajrić (yellow card) 19'; Jairo 62'; Al Ghaddioui 90'; Rudko (yellow card) 90+6'	Stadium: Tsirio Stadium; Referee: Miguel Nogueira

29 April 2022 29	Pafos	1–1	Aris Limassol	Paphos
19:00 EEST (UTC+3)	E.Petrou (red card) 63'; Jairo (yellow card) 77' (goal) 90+8'; Puncheon (yellow card) 88'; Bajrić (yellow card) 90+4'	Report	M.Šlogar (yellow card) 18'; Yablonsky (yellow card) 35'; Yago (yellow card) 55'; Bognár (yellow card) 67'; Brown (yellow card) 85'; Delmiro 90+2'	Stadium: Stelios Kyriakides Stadium; Referee: Rosario Abisso

9 May 2022 30	Anorthosis Famagusta	1–0	Pafos	Larnaca
19:00 EEST (UTC+3)	J.Escoval (yellow card) 20'; Correa (yellow card) 56'; Vrhovec (yellow card) 67' (goal) 72'; Christodoulopoulos (yellow card) 74'; Correia (yellow card) 83'	Report	Tomečak (yellow card) 7'; Puncheon (yellow card) 66'; Palacios (yellow card) 71'	Stadium: Antonis Papadopoulos Stadium; Referee: João Pinheiro

14 May 2022 31	AEK Larnaca	2–0	Pafos	Larnaca
19:00 EEST (UTC+3)	Gyurcsó 15' (yellow card) 80'; Trichkovski 25' (pen.); Mamas (yellow card) 68'	Report	Hočko (yellow card) 35'; Fylaktou (yellow card) 58'; Semedo (red card) 73'; Talys (yellow card) 80'	Stadium: AEK Arena; Referee: Marco Piccinini

22 May 2022 32	Pafos	3–1	APOEL	Paphos
19:00 EEST (UTC+3)	Kvída 4'; Jairo 33', 78'; Bajrić (yellow card) 56'	Report	Souza (yellow card) 7' (yellow-red card) 86' (goal) 54'; De Vincenti (yellow card) 48'	Stadium: Stelios Kyriakides Stadium; Referee: Fábio Veríssimo

=== Cypriot Cup ===
22 September 2021 First Round	Omonia 29is Maiou	0–1	Pafos	Lakatamia
19:00 EET (UTC+2)		Report	K.Antoniou (yellow card) 7'; A.Michael (yellow card) 65'; Valakari 88'; Fylaktou (yellow card) 90'	Stadium: Keryneia Epistrophi Stadium

19 January 2022 Second Round 1st leg	Pafos	1–3	Anorthosis Famagusta	Paphos
16:30 EET (UTC+2)	Antoniades 42' (o.g.); Rudko (red card) 50'; Panić (yellow card) 81'; Bajrić (yellow card) 82'; Kovačević (yellow card) 86'; Palacios (red card) 90+2'	Report	Popović 53'; Deletić (yellow card) 64'; Hambardzumyan 71'; Christodoulopoulos 80'	Stadium: Stelios Kyriakides Stadium

3 February 2022 Second Round 2nd leg	Anorthosis Famagusta	0–0 (3–1 agg.)	Pafos	Larnaca
18:00 EET (UTC+2)	Hočko (yellow card) 39+18'; Aurélio (yellow card) 52'; Panić (yellow card) 90'	Report	Vrhovec (yellow card) 54'; Escoval (yellow card) 74'; Artymatas (yellow card) 90'	Stadium: Antonis Papadopoulos Stadium; Referee: D.Solomou

== Squad statistics ==
As of match played 22 May 2022

=== Appearances and goals ===
No.	Pos	Nat	Player	Total		Cyta Championship		Cypriot Cup	
No.	Pos	Nat	Player	Apps	Goals	Apps	Goals	Apps	Goals
1	GK	(Ukraine) UKR	Artur Rudko	31	0	28	0	3	0
2	DF	(Colombia) COL	Jeisson Palacios	13	1	8+3	1	2	0
4	DF	(Czech Republic) CZE	Josef Kvída	28	1	25+2	1	1	0
6	MF	(Montenegro) MNE	Deni Hočko	16	0	10+4	0	1+1	0
7	FW	(Cape Verde) CPV	Willy Semedo	28	4	25+1	4	1+1	0
8	FW	(Croatia) CRO	Franko Kovačević	28	1	11+14	1	2+1	0
9	FW	(France) FRA	Kévin Bérigaud	9	0	2+6	0	1	0
10	FW	(Brazil) BRA	Jairo	32	8	29+1	8	1+1	0
12	GK	(Cyprus) CYP	Evgenios Petrou	4	0	3+1	0	0	0
14	FW	(Brazil) BRA	Douglas Aurélio	24	4	6+16	4	2	0
16	MF	(Cape Verde) CPV	Bruno Leite	4	0	0+2	0	1+1	0
18	FW	(Russia) RUS	Magomedkhabib Abdusalamov	18	3	6+11	3	1	0
19	MF	(Norway) NOR	Eirik Hestad	10	0	4+4	0	0+2	0
20	DF	(Portugal) POR	João Aurélio	19	0	19	0	0	0
21	MF	(Cyprus) CYP	Gerasimos Fylaktou	5	0	1+3	0	1	0
22	FW	(Germany) GER	Hamadi Al Ghaddioui	13	3	8+5	3	0	0
23	DF	(Cyprus) CYP	Alexandros Michael	8	0	6+1	0	1	0
24	MF	(Finland) FIN	Onni Valakari	28	11	24+2	10	1+1	1
25	MF	(Netherlands) NED	Navarone Foor	28	0	10+16	0	1+1	0
27	DF	(Brazil) BRA	Talys	18	0	15+1	0	0+2	0
28	MF	(Serbia) SRB	Stefan Panić	28	2	22+3	2	1+2	0
30	MF	(Romania) ROU	Vlad Dragomir	27	1	13+11	1	3	0
31	GK	(Austria) AUT	Daniel Antosch	2	0	1	0	0+1	0
33	DF	(Slovenia) SLO	Kenan Bajrić	32	0	30	0	2	0
42	MF	(England) ENG	Jason Puncheon	24	1	20+3	1	0+1	0
44	DF	(Croatia) CRO	Ivan Tomečak	14	0	12+1	0	1	0
55	DF	(Croatia) CRO	Martin Pajić	18	0	12+3	0	3	0
Players away on loan:
3	DF	(Brazil) BRA	Ailton	6	0	2+3	0	1	0
5	DF	(Cyprus) CYP	Kyriakos Antoniou	1	0	0	0	1	0
Players who appeared for Pafos but left during the season:
17	MF	(Armenia) ARM	Edgar Babayan	6	0	0+5	0	1	0

=== Goal scorers ===
Place	Position	Nation	Number	Name	Cyta Championship	Cypriot Cup	Total
1	MF	(Finland)	24	Onni Valakari	10	1	11
2	FW	(Brazil)	10	Jairo	8	0	8
3	FW	(Cape Verde)	7	Willy Semedo	4	0	4
3	FW	(Brazil)	14	Douglas Aurélio	4	0	4
5	FW	(Russia)	18	Magomedkhabib Abdusalamov	3	0	3
5	FW	(Germany)	21	Hamadi Al Ghaddioui	3	0	3
7	MF	(Serbia)	28	Stefan Panić	2	0	2
8	MF	(Romania)	30	Vlad Dragomir	1	0	1
8	FW	(Croatia)	8	Franko Kovačević	1	0	1
8	DF	(Colombia)	2	Jeisson Palacios	1	0	1
8	MF	(England)	42	Jason Puncheon	1	0	1
8	DF	(Croatia)	4	Josef Kvída	1	0	1
8				Own goal	0	1	1
Total					39	2	41

=== Clean sheets ===
Place	Position	Nation	Number	Name	Cyta Championship	Cypriot Cup	Total
1	GK	(Ukraine)	1	Artur Rudko	8	2	10
2	GK	(Cyprus)	12	Evgenios Petrou	2	0	2
TOTALS					10	2	12

=== Disciplinary record ===
Number	Nation	Position	Name	Cyta Championship		Cypriot Cup		Total	
Number	Nation	Position	Name	Booked	Sent off (straight red)	Booked	Sent off (straight red)	Booked	Sent off (straight red)
1	(Ukraine)	GK	Artur Rudko	1	0	0	1	1	1
2	(Colombia)	DF	Jeisson Palacios	2	0	0	1	2	1
4	(Czech Republic)	DF	Josef Kvída	5	1	0	0	5	1
6	(Montenegro)	MF	Deni Hočko	4	0	1	0	5	0
7	(Cape Verde)	FW	Willy Semedo	4	1	0	0	4	1
8	(Croatia)	FW	Franko Kovačević	3	1	1	0	4	1
10	(Brazil)	FW	Jairo	8	0	0	0	8	0
12	(Cyprus)	GK	Evgenios Petrou	0	1	0	0	0	1
14	(Brazil)	FW	Douglas Aurélio	0	0	1	0	1	0
20	(Portugal)	DF	João Aurélio	6	0	0	0	6	0
21	(Cyprus)	DF	Gerasimos Fylaktou	2	0	1	0	3	0
22	(Germany)	FW	Hamadi Al Ghaddioui	3	0	0	0	3	0
23	(Cyprus)	DF	Alexandros Michael	3	0	1	0	4	0
24	(Finland)	MF	Onni Valakari	1	1	0	0	1	1
25	(Netherlands)	MF	Navarone Foor	2	0	0	0	2	0
27	(Brazil)	DF	Talys	3	0	0	0	3	0
28	(Serbia)	MF	Stefan Panić	10	1	2	0	12	1
30	(Romania)	MF	Vlad Dragomir	4	0	0	0	4	0
33	(Slovenia)	DF	Kenan Bajrić	7	0	1	0	8	0
42	(England)	MF	Jason Puncheon	9	0	0	0	9	0
44	(Croatia)	DF	Ivan Tomečak	2	0	0	0	2	0
55	(Croatia)	DF	Martin Pajić	3	0	0	0	3	0
Players away on loan:
5	(Cyprus)	DF	Kyriakos Antoniou	0	0	1	0	1	0
Players who left Pafos during the season:
Total				82	6	9	2	91	8
