= Besart =

Besart is a given name. Notable people with the name include:

- Besart Abdurahimi (born 1990), Macedonian footballer
- Besart Berisha (born 1985), Kosovar-Albanian footballer
- Besart Ibraimi (born 1986), Macedonian footballer

== See also ==
- Beart (disambiguation)
