= Majchrowicz =

Majchrowicz is a Polish surname. Notable people with the surname include:

- Adam Majchrowicz (born 1991), Polish tennis player
- Filip Majchrowicz (born 2000), Polish footballer
