= Daniel Antosch =

Austrian association football player

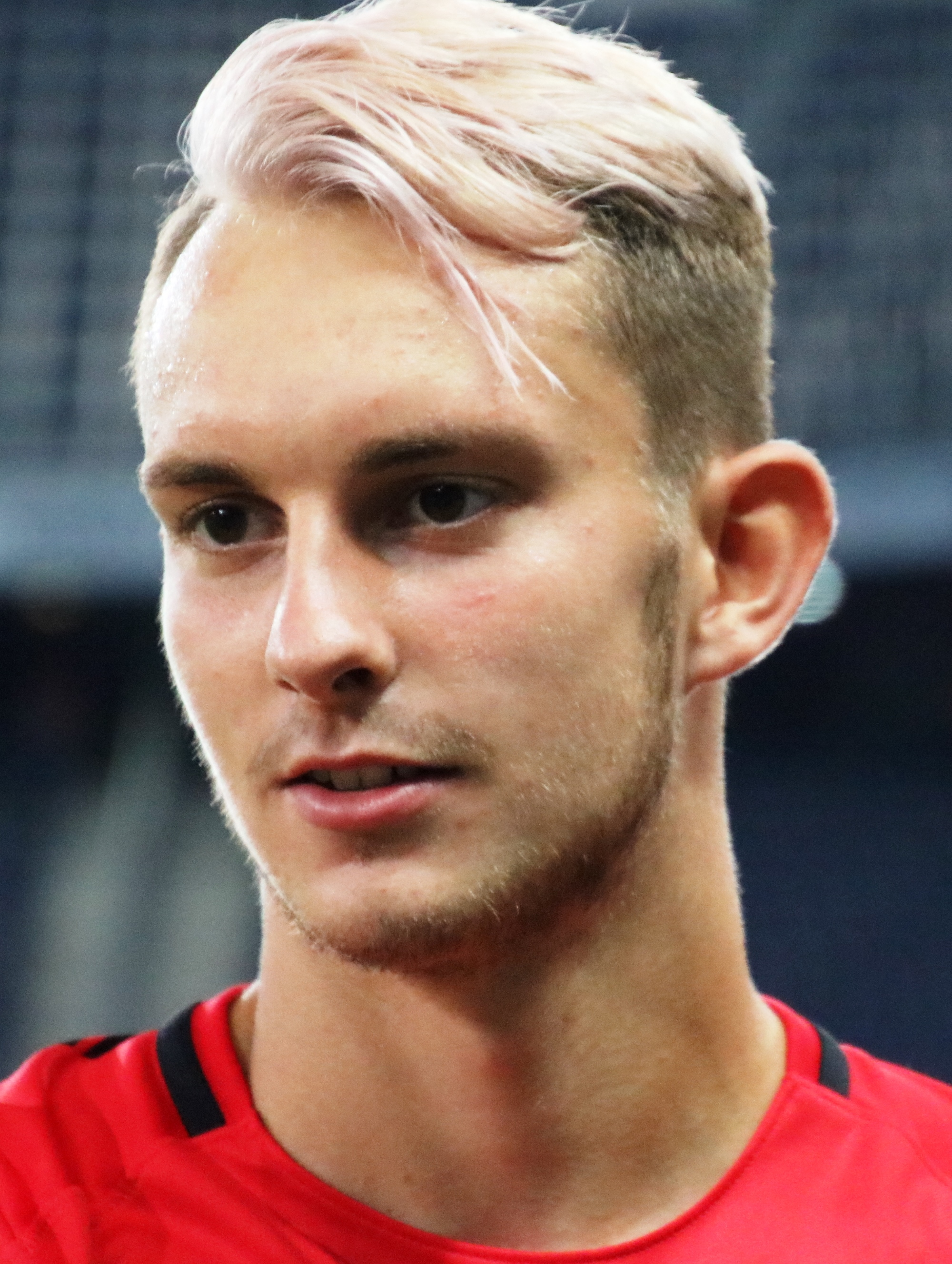

Personal information
- Full name: Daniel Antosch
- Date of birth: 7 March 2000 (age 26)
- Place of birth: Austria
- Height: 1.90 m (6 ft 3 in)
- Position: Goalkeeper

Team information
- Current team: Rheindorf Altach
- Number: 31

Youth career
- Red Bull Salzburg

Senior career*
| Years | Team | Apps | (Gls) |
| 2018–2021 | FC Liefering | 59 | (0) |
| 2020–2021 | → SV Horn (loan) | 11 | (0) |
| 2021–2023 | Pafos | 21 | (0) |
| 2023–2024 | Apollon Limassol | 0 | (0) |
| 2023–2024 | → Karmiotissa (loan) | 16 | (0) |
| 2024–2025 | Nea Salamina | 11 | (0) |
| 2025– | Rheindorf Altach | 1 | (0) |

International career^{‡}
| 2016–2017 | Austria U17 | 5 | (0) |
- * Club domestic league appearances and goals as of 10 June 2026 ‡ National team caps and goals as of 1 January 2019

Daniel Antosch (born 7 March 2000) is an Austrian professional footballer who plays as a goalkeeper for Rheindorf Altach.

== Career ==
Antosch started his career with FC Liefering.

== Career statistics ==
As of 27 May 2024

Appearances and goals by club, season and competition
| Club | Season | League | | | Cup | | Continental | | Other | | Total | |
| Club | Season | Division | Apps | Goals | Apps | Goals | Apps | Goals | Apps | Goals | Apps | Goals |
|---|---|---|---|---|---|---|---|---|---|---|---|---|
| FC Liefering | 2017–18 | 2. Liga | 2 | 0 | — | | — | | — | | 2 | 0 |
| FC Liefering | 2018–19 | 2. Liga | 18 | 0 | 0 | 0 | — | | — | | 18 | 0 |
| FC Liefering | 2019–20 | 2. Liga | 27 | 0 | 0 | 0 | — | | — | | 27 | 0 |
| FC Liefering | 2020–21 | 2. Liga | 12 | 0 | 0 | 0 | — | | — | | 21 | 0 |
| FC Liefering | Total | | 59 | 0 | 9 | 0 | — | | — | | 59 | 0 |
| SV Horn (loan) | 2020–21 | 2. Liga | 11 | 0 | — | | — | | — | | 11 | 0 |
| Pafos | 2021–22 | Cypriot First Division | 2 | 0 | 1 | 0 | — | | — | | 3 | 0 |
| Pafos | 2022–23 | Cypriot First Division | 19 | 0 | 0 | 0 | — | | — | | 19 | 0 |
| Pafos | Total | | 21 | 0 | 1 | 0 | 0 | 0 | 0 | 0 | 22 | 0 |
| Karmiotissa (loan) | 2023–24 | Cypriot First Division | 16 | 0 | 0 | 0 | — | | — | | 16 | 0 |
| Career total | | | 107 | 0 | 1 | 0 | 0 | 0 | 0 | 0 | 108 | 0 |
