= Ailton (footballer, born 1995) =

Brazilian footballer

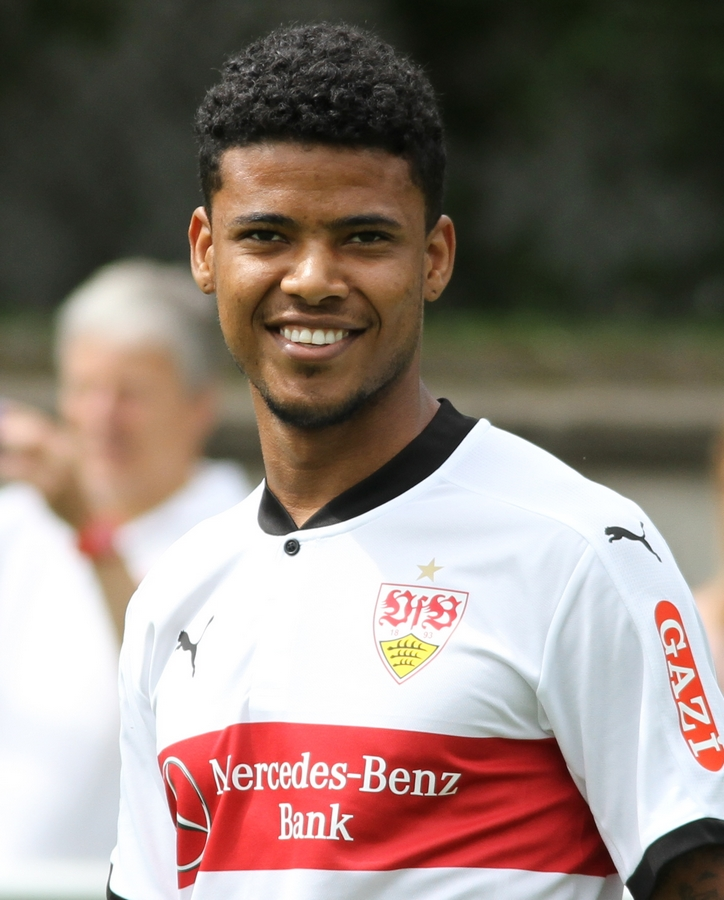
- Ailton with VfB Stuttgart in 2017

Personal information
- Full name: Ailton Ferreira Silva
- Date of birth: 16 March 1995 (age 31)
- Place of birth: Lauro de Freitas, Brazil
- Height: 1.81 m (5 ft 11 in)
- Position: Left back

Team information
- Current team: Amazonas

Youth career
- –2013: Fluminense

Senior career*
Years	Team	Apps	(Gls)
2013–2017	Fluminense	5	(0)
2015	→ Jacobina (loan)	7	(0)
2015–2016	→ Neftçi (loan)	32	(3)
2016–2017	→ Estoril (loan)	18	(0)
2017–2021	VfB Stuttgart	5	(0)
2018	→ Estoril (loan)	11	(0)
2018–2019	→ Braga (loan)	2	(0)
2019–2020	→ Qarabağ (loan)	15	(1)
2021	Midtjylland	8	(0)
2021–2022	Pafos	5	(0)
2022	→ Náutico (loan)	4	(1)
2022–2023	Rodina Moscow	0	(0)
2024	Amazonas	0	(0)
2026–	ASA	0	(0)
- * Club domestic league appearances and goals as of 19 November 2026

Ailton Ferreira Silva (born 16 March 1995), commonly known as Ailton, is a Brazilian professional footballer who plays as a left back for Amazonas.

== Career ==
=== Fluminense ===
Having started his career with Brazilian side Fluminense, he made his league debut for the club against Grêmio on 12 October 2013.

=== Neftçi ===
Ailton moved to Azerbaijan Premier League side Neftchi Baku on a season-long loan deal in June 2015. He made his league debut for the club against Kapaz on 9 August 2015. Ailton scored his first league goal for the club against Qarabağ on 16 April 2016, scoring in the 74th minute.

=== Estoril ===
The following season, Ailton moved to Portuguese Primeira Liga side Estoril on a season-long loan deal. He made his league debut against Rio Ave on 1 October 2016. Ailton scored his first goal for the club in the Taça de Portugal, scoring against Cova Piedade on 19 November 2016, scoring in the 21st minute.

=== VfB Stuttgart ===
In July 2017, Ailton joined VfB Stuttgart and agreed to a four-year-contract. The transfer fee paid to Estoril was reported as close to €1 million.

Ailton made his league debut for the club against Hertha BSC on 19 August 2017.

=== Second spell at Estoril ===
On 25 January 2018, Ailton was loaned out to Estoril until the end of the season. During his second spell at the club, he made his league debut against Tondela on 30 January 2018.

=== SC Braga ===
For the 2018–19 season he was loaned out to Braga. Ailton made his league debut for the club against C.D. Nacional on 18 January 2019.

He also made an appearance for S.C. Braga B, making his debut for the club against Académica on 11 November 2018.

=== Qarabağ ===
On 4 July 2019, Ailton was loaned out at Qarabağ until the end of the season. He made his league debut for the club against Shamakhi on 16 August 2019. Ailton scored his first goal for the club against Zira on 15 February 2020, scoring in the 28th minute.

=== Midtjylland ===
Ailton moved to Danish Superliga club FC Midtjylland on a permanent transfer on 1 February 2021, the last day of the 2020–21 transfer window. He made his league debut for the club against Lyngby on 4 March 2021.

=== Pafos ===
On 24 August 2021, Pafos announced the signing of Ailton. He made his league debut for the club against Apollon on 23 October 2021.

=== Náutico ===
Ailton scored on his league debut for Náutico against CRB on 28 April 2022, scoring in the 89th minute.

=== Rodina Moscow ===
On 20 September 2022, Rodina Moscow announced the signing of Ailton. He made his debut for the club in the Russian Cup against Kosmos Dolgoprudny on 5 October 2022.

== Career statistics ==
As of match played 27 May 2022

Appearances and goals by club, season and competition
Club	Season	League			State League		National Cup		League Cup		Continental		Total	
Club	Season	Division	Apps	Goals	Apps	Goals	Apps	Goals	Apps	Goals	Apps	Goals	Apps	Goals
Fluminense	2013	Brasileirão Série A	2	0	0	0	0	0	—		0	0	2	0
Fluminense	2014	Brasileirão Série A	0	0	3	0	0	0	—		—		3	0
Fluminense	2015	Brasileirão Série A	0	0	0	0	0	0	—		—		0	0
Fluminense	2016	Brasileirão Série A	0	0	0	0	0	0	—		—		0	0
Fluminense	2017	Brasileirão Série A	0	0	0	0	0	0	—		—		0	0
Fluminense	Total		2	0	3	0	0	0	0	0	0	0	5	0
Jacobina (loan)	2015	Campeonato Baiano	0	0	7	0	0	0	—				7	0
Neftchi Baku (loan)	2015–16	Azerbaijan Premier League	32	3	—		5	0	—		2	0	39	3
Estoril (loan)	2016–17	Primeira Liga	18	0	—		5	1	1	0	—		24	1
Stuttgart	2017–18	Bundesliga	5	0	—		0	0	—				5	0
Stuttgart	2018–19	Bundesliga	0	0	—		0	0	—				0	0
Stuttgart	2019–20	2. Bundesliga	0	0	—		0	0	—				0	0
Stuttgart	2020–21	Bundesliga	0	0	—		0	0	—				0	0
Stuttgart	Total		5	0	-	-	0	0	-	-	-	-	5	0
Estoril (loan)	2017–18	Primeira Liga	11	0	—		0	0	0	0	—		11	0
Braga (loan)	2018–19	Primeira Liga	2	0	—		0	0	1	0	0	0	3	0
Braga B (loan)	2018–19	LigaPro	1	0	—		0	0	—				1	0
Qarabağ (loan)	2019–20	Azerbaijan Premier League	15	1	—		1	0	—		12	2	28	3
Midtjylland	2020–21	Danish Superliga	8	0	—		4	0	—				12	0
Pafos	2021–22	Cypriot First Division	5	0	—		1	0	—				6	0
Náutico (loan)	2022	Brasileirão Série B	4	1	0	0	0	0	—				4	1
Rodina Moscow	2022–23	Russian First League	0	0	—		0	0	—				0	0
Career total			110	5	3	0	16	1	2	0	14	2	145	8
