= Jefté Betancor =

Spanish footballer (born 1993)

Personal information
- Full name: Jefté Betancor Sánchez
- Date of birth: 6 July 1993 (age 33)
- Place of birth: Las Palmas, Spain
- Height: 1.87 m (6 ft 2 in)
- Position: Forward

Team information
- Current team: Las Palmas
- Number: 7

Youth career
- Unión Viera
- 2009–2011: Vecindario
- 2011: → Real Madrid (loan)
- 2011–2012: Hércules

Senior career*
Years	Team	Apps	(Gls)
2011–2012	Hércules B		
2011	Hércules	2	(0)
2012	Ontinyent	6	(0)
2013–2014	Tenerife B	50	(28)
2014–2015	Eldense	16	(2)
2015	Unión Viera	14	(5)
2015	Badajoz	0	(0)
2015–2017	Las Palmas B	31	(16)
2016–2017	→ Arandina (loan)	18	(3)
2017	→ San Fernando (loan)	14	(8)
2017	Unión Viera	10	(8)
2018	Stadl-Paura	10	(9)
2018–2019	Mattersburg	6	(1)
2019	→ Vorwärts Steyr (loan)	14	(5)
2019–2020	Ried	28	(14)
2020–2021	Voluntari	29	(8)
2021–2022	Farul Constanța	35	(16)
2022–2023	CFR Cluj	21	(2)
2023	→ Pafos (loan)	8	(0)
2024–2025	Panserraikos	30	(18)
2025–2026	Olympiacos	0	(0)
2025	→ Panserraikos (loan)	13	(5)
2025–2026	→ Albacete (loan)	38	(14)
2026–	Las Palmas	12	(2)
- * Club domestic league appearances and goals as of 9 November 2026

Jefté Betancor Sánchez (born 6 July 1993) is a Spanish professional footballer who plays as a forward for Segunda División club Las Palmas.

== Career ==
=== Spain ===
Born in Las Palmas, Canary Islands of Malaysian descent, Betancor was noted as a 17-year-old at UD Vecindario, being called to the Canary Islands autonomous team and invited by Real Madrid to play an international tournament with its youth side in April 2011. In the 2011–12 season, Hércules CF director of football Sergio Fernández decided to sign the player for the club's youth system, and he immediately started appearing for the reserves in the regional leagues.

On 27 August 2011, first-team manager Juan Carlos Mandiá handed Betancor his professional debut, as he played injury time in a 2–0 home win against FC Cartagena in the Segunda División. Following his release, he joined Ontinyent CF of Segunda División B.

On 16 January 2013, Betancor agreed to a deal at CA Ceuta in the Tercera División, but eventually moved to CD Tenerife B instead. He departed the latter on 25 June 2014,

After struggling with injuries, Betancor joined CF Unión Viera, a club he already represented as a youth, on 29 January 2015. He moved to CD Badajoz for the play-offs on 13 May, before signing for another reserve team, UD Las Palmas Atlético, on 14 July.

Betancor subsequently served loans at Arandina CF and UD San Fernando before returning to Viera in August 2017.

=== Austria ===
Betancor moved abroad in December 2017, signing with modest Austrian side ATSV Stadl-Paura. In the ensuing off-season he joined SV Mattersburg also in the country, making his first appearance in top-flight football on 11 August and scoring in the Bundesliga away fixture against TSV Hartberg (4–2 loss). On 22 January 2019, he was loaned to SK Vorwärts Steyr until 30 June.

On 26 June 2019, Betancor joined SV Ried also in Austria. He was crowned 2. Liga champion in his only season.

=== Romania ===
Betancor moved to Romania in September 2020 with FC Voluntari, helping the club retain its Liga I status before signing for FCV Farul Constanța the next summer. In December 2021, he was handed the Foreign Player of the Year award by the Gazeta Sporturilor daily after netting 19 times during the calendar year.

On 18 June 2022, Betancor transferred to five-time defending champions CFR Cluj. In the following transfer window, he was loaned to Pafos FC of Cypriot First Division.

=== Greece ===
Betancor joined Super League Greece side Panserraikos F.C. in January 2024. In September that year, he began a run of eight consecutive matches scoring, helping his team to leave the relegation zone.

On 14 January 2025, Betancor was signed by Olympiacos F.C. in the same country; he was immediately loaned to his previous club until the end of the season.

=== Back to Spain ===
On 8 August 2025, Jefté returned to Spain seven years after leaving, joining second-tier Albacete Balompié on a one-year loan deal. The following 14 January he scored twice, including a stoppage-time winner, in a 3–2 victory over Real Madrid in the round of 16 of the Copa del Rey.

After 18 goals in all competitions, Jefté returned to his hometown on a three-year contract at UD Las Palmas.

== Career statistics ==
As of 9 November 2026

Appearances and goals by club, season and competition
Club	Season	League			National cup (Note: Includes Copa del Rey, Austrian Cup, Romanian Cup, Cypriot Cup, Greek Football Cup)		Continental		Other		Total	
Club	Season	Division	Apps	Goals	Apps	Goals	Apps	Goals	Apps	Goals	Apps	Goals
Hércules	2011–12	Segunda División	2	0	0	0	—		—		2	0
Ontinyent	2012–13	Segunda División B	6	0	0	0	—		—		6	0
Tenerife B	2012–13	Tercera División	16	11	—		—		—		16	11
Tenerife B	2013–14	Tercera División	34	17	—		—		5 (Note: Appearance(s) in Tercera División play-offs)	1	39	18
Tenerife B	Total		50	28	—		—		5	1	55	29
Eldense	2014–15	Segunda División B	16	2	2	1	—		—		18	3
Unión Viera	2014–15	Tercera División	14	5	—		—		—		14	5
Badajoz	2014–15	Tercera División	—		—		—		2	0	2	0
Las Palmas Atlético	2015–16	Tercera División	31	16	—		—		4	0	35	16
Arandina (loan)	2016–17	Segunda División B	18	3	0	0	—		—		18	3
San Fernando (loan)	2016–17	Tercera División	14	8	—		—		4	1	18	9
Unión Viera	2017–18	Interinsular Preferente	10	8	—		—		—		10	8
Stadl-Paura	2017–18	Austrian Regionalliga Central	10	9	0	0	—		—		10	9
Mattersburg	2018–19	Austrian Bundesliga	6	1	1	0	—		—		7	1
Vorwärts Steyr (loan)	2018–19	2. Liga	14	5	0	0	—		—		14	5
Ried	2019–20	2. Liga	28	14	2	2	—		—		30	16
Voluntari	2020–21	Liga I	20	6	0	0	—		11 (Note: Appearances in Liga I relegation playoffs)	4	31	10
Farul Constanța	2021–22	Liga I	28	15	1	0	—		7 (Note: Appearances in Liga I championship playoffs)	1	36	16
Cluj	2022–23	Liga I	7	1	0	0	7 (Note: One appearance in UEFA Champions League, six appearances and two goals in UEFA Conference League)	2	1 (Note: Appearance in Supercupa României)	0	15	3
Cluj	2023–24	Liga I	14	1	1	0	2 (Note: Appearances in UEFA Conference League)	1	—		17	2
Cluj	Total		21	2	1	0	9	3	1	0	32	5
Pafos (loan)	2022–23	Cypriot First Division	6	0	4	1	—		2 (Note: Appearances in Cypriot First Division championship round)	0	12	1
Panserraikos	2023–24	Super League Greece	7	3	3	1	—		6 (Note: Appearances in Super League Greece play-out)	1	16	4
Panserraikos	2024–25	Super League Greece	22	16	3	2	—		8	3	33	21
Panserraikos	Total		29	19	6	3	0	0	14	4	49	25
Albacete (loan)	2025–26	Segunda División	38	14	5	4	—		—		43	18
Las Palmas	2026–27	Segunda División	12	2	0	0	—		—		12	2
Career total			373	157	22	11	9	3	50	11	454	182

== Honours ==
Ried

- 2. Liga: 2019–20

CFR Cluj

- Supercupa României runner-up: 2022

Individual

- Super League Greece top scorer: 2024–25
- Foreign Player of the Year in Romania (Gazeta Sporturilor): 2021
- Gazeta Sporturilor Romania Player of the Month: August 2021
- Liga I Team of the Season: 2021–22
