= Bruno Tavares =

Portuguese football player (born 2002)

Personal information
- Full name: Bruno Miguel Costa Monteiro Tavares
- Date of birth: 16 April 2002 (age 24)
- Place of birth: Lisbon, Portugal
- Height: 1.70 m (5 ft 7 in)
- Position: Winger

Team information
- Current team: TransINVEST
- Number: 49

Youth career
- 2010–2011: Sporting CP
- 2011–2012: Belenenses
- 2012–2021: Sporting CP

Senior career*
Years	Team	Apps	(Gls)
2021–2022	Sporting CP	0	(0)
2021–2022	→ Varzim (loan)	17	(0)
2022–2024	Pafos	16	(0)
2024	Auda	30	(0)
2025	Žalgiris	35	(2)
2026–	TransINVEST	10	(0)

International career
2017	Portugal U15	5	(0)
2017–2018	Portugal U16	9	(1)
2018–2019	Portugal U17	18	(4)
2019	Portugal U18	6	(4)
2022	Portugal U20	2	(0)
- * Club domestic league appearances and goals as of 7 July 2026

Bruno Miguel Costa Monteiro Tavares (born 16 April 2002) is a Portuguese professional footballer who plays as a winger for TransINVEST.

== Club career ==
Tavares is a youth academy graduate of Sporting CP. On 31 August 2021, he joined Varzim on a season-long loan deal. He made his professional debut for the club on 22 October 2021 in a 1–0 league defeat against Académico Viseu.

Tavares signed with Cypriot First Division club Pafos on 4 July 2022. He made his debut on 8 February 2023 in Cypriot First Division against AEL Limassol.

On 7 February 2025, it was announced that Bruno Tavares signed with the Lithuanian Žalgiris Club.

On 4 August 2025, Tavares scored his first goal in A Lyga against Kauno Žalgirs.

On 20 March 2026, Tavares signed for fellow TOPLYGA side TransINVEST.

== International career ==
Tavares is a Portuguese youth international. He was part of squad which reached quarter-finals of 2019 UEFA European Under-17 Championship.

== Career statistics ==
=== Club ===
As of match played 8 February 2023

Appearances and goals by club, season and competition
Club	Season	League			Cup (Note: Includes Taça de Portugal and Cypriot Cup)		Europa		Total	
Club	Season	Division	Apps	Goals	Apps	Goals	Apps	Goals	Apps	Goals
Varzim (loan)	2021–22	Liga Portugal 2	17	0	1	0	0	0	18	0
Total			17	0	1	0	0	0	18	0
Pafos	2022–23	Cypriot First Division	1	0	2	0	0	0	3	0
Career total			18	0	3	0	0	0	21	0
