= Juninho (footballer, born December 1995) =

Brazilian association football player

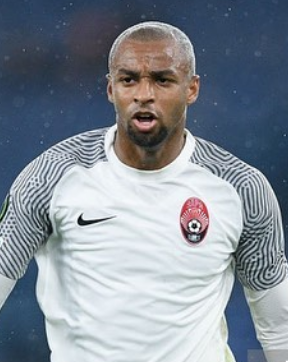
- Leovigildo Junior Reis Rodrigues

Personal information
- Full name: Leovigildo Júnior Reis Rodrigues
- Date of birth: 26 December 1995 (age 30)
- Place of birth: Santana de Cataguases, Minas Gerais, Brazil
- Height: 1.75 m (5 ft 9 in)
- Position: Defender

Team information
- Current team: Zorya Luhansk
- Number: 10

Youth career
- –2013: Metropolitano

Senior career*
Years	Team	Apps	(Gls)
2013–2017	Metropolitano	11	(1)
2017	Tupi	5	(0)
2018	Salgueiro	1	(0)
2018–2019	Makedonija	18	(0)
2019–2020	Vardar	37	(8)
2020–2022	Zorya Luhansk	24	(1)
2022	→ Goiás EC (loan)	0	(0)
2022–2023	Pafos	31	(1)
2024–	Zorya Luhansk	62	(1)
- * Club domestic league appearances and goals as of 3 June 2026

Leovigildo Júnior Reis Rodrigues (born 26 December 1995) Santana de Cataguases, Minas Gerais, Brazil, commonly known as Juninho, is a Brazilian professional footballer who plays as a defender for Zorya Luhansk in the Ukrainian Premier League.

== Career ==
On 28 July 2020, after two years in Macedonia, Juninho joined Ukrainian Premier League side Zorya Luhansk on a two-year deal.

== Career statistics ==
As of 3 July 2023

Appearances and goals by club, season and competition
Club	Season	League			Cup		State league		Other		Total	
Club	Season	Division	Apps	Goals	Apps	Goals	Apps	Goals	Apps	Goals	Apps	Goals
Metropolitano	2013	Série D	0	0	0	0	0	0	0	0	0	0
Metropolitano	2014	Série D	2	0	0	0	6 (Note: Appearance(s) in Campeonato Catarinense)	0	0	0	8	0
Metropolitano	2015	Série D	3	1	0	0	8	0	0	0	11	1
Metropolitano	2016	Série D	6	0	0	0	16	1	0	0	22	1
Metropolitano	2017	Série D	0	0	0	0	16	0	0	0	16	0
Metropolitano	Total		11	1	0	0	46	1	0	0	57	2
Tupi	2017	Série C	5	0	0	0	0	0	0	0	5	0
Salgueiro	2018	Série C	1	0	1	0	10 (Note: Appearance(s) in Campeonato Pernambucano)	0	4 (Note: Appearance(s) in Copa do Nordeste)	0	16	0
Makedonija	2018–19	Macedonian First League	18	0	2	0	—		0	0	20	0
Vardar	2018–19	Macedonian First League	16	3	0	0	—		—		16	3
Vardar	2019–20	Macedonian First League	21	5	0	0	—		—		21	5
Vardar	Total		37	8	0	0	—		—		37	8
Zorya Luhansk	2020–21	Ukrainian Premier League	13	1	1	0	—		—		14	1
Zorya Luhansk	2021–22	Ukrainian Premier League	11	0	1	0	5	0	—		17	0
Zorya Luhansk	Total		24	1	2	0	5	0	—		31	1
Pafos	2022–23	Cypriot First Division	31	1	5	0	—		—		36	1
Career total			127	11	9	0	61	1	4	0	202	12
