= Edgar Babayan =

Footballer (born 1995)

Personal information
- Date of birth: 28 October 1995 (age 31)
- Place of birth: Berlin, Germany
- Height: 1.78 m (5 ft 10 in)
- Position: Winger

Youth career
- Randers

Senior career*
Years	Team	Apps	(Gls)
2013–2017	Randers	19	(0)
2017	→ Hobro (loan)	9	(2)
2017–2021	Hobro	95	(18)
2021	Riga	11	(2)
2021–2022	Pafos	4	(0)
2022	Vejle	13	(0)
2022–2025	Randers	32	(2)

International career
2016	Denmark U20	1	(0)
2018–2022	Armenia	16	(1)
- * Club domestic league appearances and goals

Edgar Babayan (Armenian: Էդգար Բաբայան; born 28 October 1995) is a retired professional footballer who played as a winger.

== Club career ==
=== Randers ===
Babayan born in Berlin, Germany, but later moved to Denmark. He started his career at Randers FC.

On 11 November 2013, Babayan got his debut for Randers FC at the age of 18. Babayan started on the bench, but replaced Alexander Fischer in the 83rd minute in a 1–4 defeat against AaB. In February 2014, Babayan signed his first professional- and full-time contract ever, with Randers FC.

Babayan scored his first goal for Randers on 9 July 2015, when he came on the pitch in the 59th minute, replacing Joel Allansson, against Andorran club Sant Julià in the Europa League qualifications. Babayan scored in the 73rd minute on a freekick.

==== Loan to Hobro IK ====
On 27 January 2017, it was confirmed that Babayan would play the rest of the season on a loan at Hobro IK.

Babayan got an injury against Skive IK on 27 February 2017 in a friendly match, before the league began again. The first rumors were, that he had suffered a ligament injury, but later announced, that it only was a bad hamstring in the knee, that would keep him out for about a month.

Babayan went back from the injury in the start of April 2017. He got his debut for Hobro in a 0–0 draw against HB Køge when he in the 69th minute replaced Lucas Jensen. In the next match against Nykøbing FC, Babayan scored two goals in their 3–1 win. Babayan won the Danish 1st Division with Hobro, and the club was promoted to the Danish Superliga again. He was a very important profile in their hunt for promotion.

=== Hobro IK ===
After a successful 6-months loan spell, Babayan signed a permanent contract with the newly promoted Danish Superliga club. Babayan quickly became a key player for the team and made his breakthrough during the 2016–17 season. He was rewarded with a new contract in March 2018 until the summer 2021.

On 1 February 2021, Babayan's contract with Hobro was terminated by mutual consent after he bought himself free, with Edgar expressing an interest to play on a higher level.

=== Riga FC ===
After leaving Hobro, Babayan joined Latvian Higher League champions, Riga FC, on a free transfer on 15 February 2021. According to rumors from Danish medias, the plan was that Babayan should leave Riga again in the summer to join Cypriot club Pafos FC, who had the same owners as Riga. However, this rumor wasn't confirmed by any official sources.

Babayan got his official debut for the club on 13 March 2021 against FK Ventspils. He came on as a substitute in the 65th minute and scored the last goal in a 3–0 victory.

=== Pafos ===
On 7 September 2021, Riga FC confirmed that Babayan's contract had been terminated by mutual agreement and that he would continue his career at Cypriot club Pafos FC. On 25 January 2022, Danish media learned that Babayan had had his contract with Pafos terminated.

=== Vejle ===
On 26 January 2022, Babayan joined Danish Superliga club Vejle Boldklub on a deal for the rest of the season. On 16 May 2022, after a total of 15 appearances for Vejle, it was confirmed that Babayan would leave the club at the end of the season, as his contract was expiring.

=== Return to Randers ===
After a spell at Vejle, it was confirmed on 7 June 2022, that Babayan would return to his former club, Randers FC, from the upcoming 2022–23 season. Babayan signed a contract until June 2025.

In September 2023, Babayan was seriously injured in a match against AGF when he ruptured a tendon under his kneecap, requiring a complicated operation. The injury ended up keeping Babayan out of action for 15 months, as Babayan didn't make his comeback on the pitch until December 2024 in a reserve team match.

On February 5, 2025, it was confirmed that 29-year-old Babayan ended his career due to the injury he sustained in September 2023, which still caused him a lot of pain.

== International career ==
Babayan was born in Germany to Armenian parents who emigrated to Denmark when he was three. He received his Danish passport in 2016, and one month later got a callup and debut for the Denmark U20 squad in a 2–0 loss to the Italy U20s. Babayan made his debut in a friendly game against Malta on 30 May 2018, where he came in off the bench and played the last 30 minutes.

He scored his first senior international goal on 18 November 2019, in a 9–1 away defeat to Italy, in Armenia's final Euro 2020 qualifier.

== Career statistics ==
=== Club ===
As of match played 24 September 2024

Club	Season	League			National Cup (Note: Includes Danish Cup, Latvian Cup, Cypriot Cup)		Continental		Other		Total	
Club	Season	Division	Apps	Goals	Apps	Goals	Apps	Goals	Apps	Goals	Apps	Goals
Randers	2013-14	Danish Superliga	1	0	0	0	0	0	—		1	0
Randers	2014-15	Danish Superliga	3	0	0	0	—		—		3	0
Randers	2015-16	Danish Superliga	7	0	0	0	3 (Note: Appearance(s) in UEFA Europa League)	1	—		10	1
Randers	2016-17	Danish Superliga	8	0	0	0	—		0	0	8	0
Randers	Total		19	0	0	0	3	1	0	0	22	1
Hobro (loan)	2016-17	Danish 1st Division	9	2	0	0	—		—		9	2
Hobro	2017-18	Danish Superliga	31	3	1	0	—		2 (Note: Appearance(s) in Danish Superliga European play-offs)	0	34	3
Hobro	2018-19	Danish Superliga	21	5	1	0	—		3 (Note: Appearance(s) in Danish Superliga Relegation play-offs)	0	25	5
Hobro	2019-20	Danish Superliga	29	4	0	0	—		2	1	31	5
Hobro	2020-21	Danish 1st Division	10	5	0	0	—		—		10	5
Hobro	Total		91	17	2	0	0	0	7	1	100	18
Riga	2021	Virslīga	11	2	0	0	7 (Note: Two appearances in UEFA Champions League, Five appearances in UEFA Europa Conference League)	0	—		18	2
Pafos	2021-22	Cypriot First Division	5	0	0	0	—		—		5	0
Vejle	2021-22	Danish Superliga	13	0	2	0	—		—		15	0
Randers	2022-23	Danish Superliga	23	2	2	0	—		—		25	2
Randers	2023-24	Danish Superliga	9	0	0	0	—		0	0	9	0
Randers	2024-25	Danish Superliga	0	0	0	0	—		—		0	0
Randers	Total		32	2	2	0	0	0	0	0	34	2
Career total			180	23	4	0	10	1	7	1	201	25

=== International ===
As of match played 19 November 2022

Armenia
Year	Apps	Goals
2018	1	0
2019	7	1
2020	3	0
2021	2	0
2022	3	0
Total	16	1

Scores and results list Armenia's goal tally first, score column indicates score after each Babayan goal.

List of international goals scored by Edgar Babayan
No.	Date	Venue	Opponent	Score	Result	Competition
1	18 November 2019	Stadio Renzo Barbera, Palermo, Italy	Italy	1–8	1–9	UEFA Euro 2020 qualifying
