= Besart Abdurahimi =

Macedonian footballer

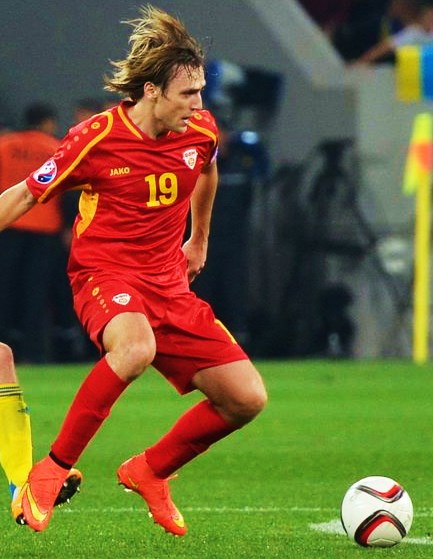

Personal information
- Date of birth: 31 July 1990 (age 36)
- Place of birth: Zagreb, SR Croatia, SFR Yugoslavia
- Height: 1.80 m (5 ft 11 in)
- Position: Right winger

Youth career
- NK Zelengaj Zagreb
- Lokomotiva Zagreb
- 2004–2008: NK Zagreb

Senior career*
| Years | Team | Apps | (Gls) |
| 2008–2014 | NK Zagreb | 121 | (29) |
| 2013–2014 | → Hapoel Tel Aviv (loan) | 20 | (4) |
| 2014–2016 | Lokeren | 32 | (5) |
| 2016 | → Astana (loan) | 7 | (0) |
| 2016 | → Cerezo Osaka (loan) | 3 | (1) |
| 2017 | Shkëndija | 26 | (5) |
| 2018 | Partizani Tirana | 13 | (2) |
| 2018–2019 | Hermannstadt | 4 | (0) |
| 2019–2020 | Bravo | 18 | (1) |
| 2020–2021 | NK Rudeš | 26 | (12) |
| 2021–2023 | Akritas Chlorakas | 31 | (10) |
| 2022–2023 | → Pafos (loan) | 25 | (8) |
| 2023–2024 | Apollon Limassol | 17 | (2) |
| 2024–2025 | Zrinjski Mostar | 6 | (2) |

International career^{‡}
| 2006 | Croatia U16 | 9 | (1) |
| 2006 | Croatia U17 | 5 | (1) |
| 2008 | Croatia U18 | 4 | (0) |
| 2008 | Croatia U19 | 8 | (5) |
| 2009 | Croatia U20 | 3 | (2) |
| 2009–2012 | Croatia U21 | 7 | (0) |
| 2014–2015 | Macedonia | 12 | (1) |
- * Club domestic league appearances and goals as of 11 August 2024 ‡ National team caps and goals as of 12 October 2015

Besart Abdurahimi (Macedonian: Бесарт Абдурахими; born 31 July 1990) is a Macedonian-Croatian footballer of Albanian descent who plays for Bosnian club Zrinjski Mostar.

== Early life ==
Abdurahimi was born in 1990 in Zagreb, Croatia to Albanian parents from Gradec, Vrapčište in North Macedonia, who had moved there five years earlier.

== Club career ==
In March 2016, Abdurahimi joined FC Astana on loan.

In October 2020, Abdurahimi returned to Croatia to join second-tier NK Rudeš in his hometown of Zagreb.

On 30 September 2022, Pafos announced the signing of Abdurahimi on loan from Akritas Chlorakas.

== International career ==
In February 2014 the Albanian media wrote about him as a good alternative for Albania's attack, since he is an ethnic Albanian. On 14 May 2014 Besart had received a call up by the Macedonia national football team for the matches against Cameroon and Qatar on 26–30 May 2014. He had accepted the call up and will represent Macedonia at the international level. He made his debut on 26 May 2014 against Cameroon. He scored his first international "winning" goal in the 92nd minute in their 3–2 win against Luxembourg on 9 October 2014.

== Career statistics ==
=== International ===
Appearances and goals by national team and year
| National team | Year | Apps | Goals |
|---|---|---|---|
| Macedonia | 2014 | 6 | 1 |
| Macedonia | 2015 | 6 | 0 |
| Total | | 12 | 1 |

Scores and results list Macedonia's goal tally first, score column indicates score after each Abdurahimi goal.

List of international goals scored by Besart Abdurahimi
| No. | Date | Venue | Opponent | Score | Result | Competition |
|---|---|---|---|---|---|---|
| 1 | 9 October 2014 | Philip II Arena, Skopje, Macedonia | Luxembourg | 3–2 | 3–2 | UEFA Euro 2016 qualification |
