= Douglas Aurélio =

Brazilian footballer (born 1999)

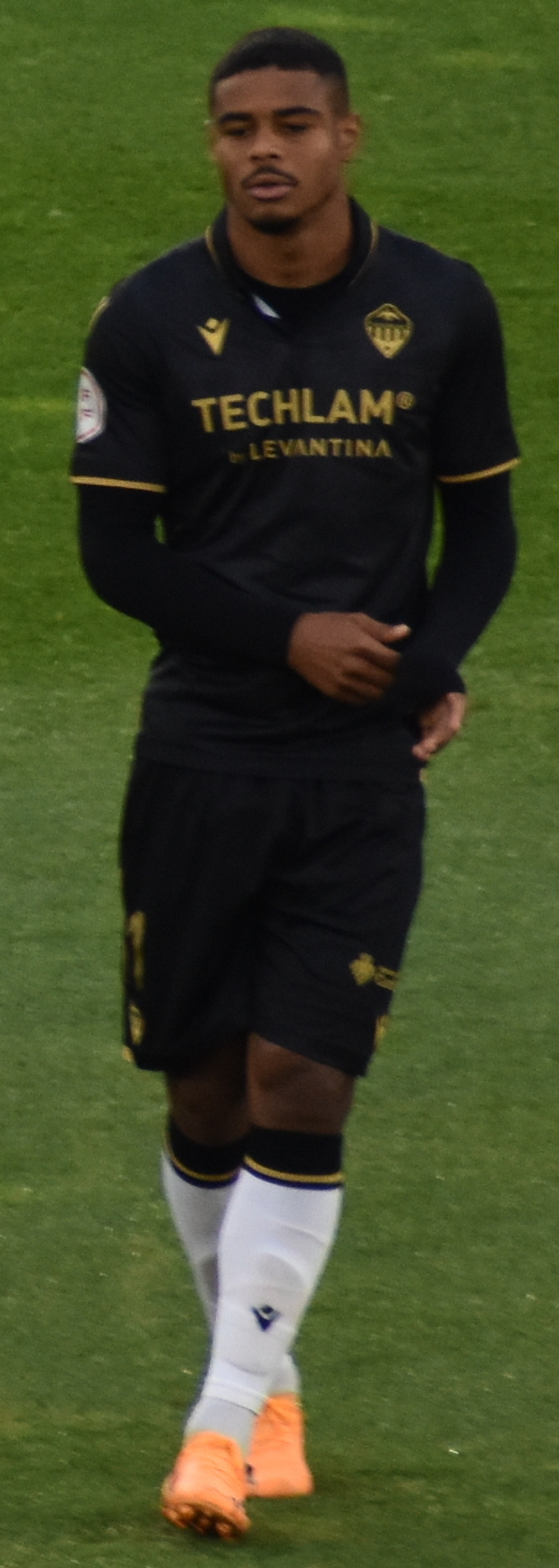
- Douglas Aurélio with Castellón in 2024

Personal information
- Date of birth: 27 March 1999 (age 27)
- Place of birth: Teófilo Otoni, Brazil
- Height: 1.83 m (6 ft 0 in)
- Position: Forward

Team information
- Current team: Huesca (on loan from Castellón)

Youth career
- 2009–2010: Loures
- 2010–2012: San Roque Lepe
- 2012–2013: Nuevo Molino
- 2013–2014: Real Massamá
- 2014–2018: Sporting CP
- 2018–2019: Belenenses SAD

Senior career*
Years	Team	Apps	(Gls)
2019–2020	Belenenses SAD	1	(0)
2020–2021	Estoril	0	(0)
2021–2023	Pafos	16	(4)
2022	→ Riga (loan)	17	(5)
2023–2024	Riga	35	(8)
2024–	Castellón	44	(8)
2026–	→ Huesca (loan)	0	(0)
- * Club domestic league appearances and goals as of 30 June 2026

Douglas Aurélio (born 27 March 1999) is a Brazilian professional footballer who plays as a forward for Spanish club SD Huesca, on loan from CD Castellón.

== Club career ==
Aurélio made his professional debut with Belenenses SAD in a 5–1 Primeira Liga loss to Vitória S.C. on 12 May 2019. On 23 June 2021, he moved to Pafos in Cyprus.

On 3 February 2023, Riga announced the singing of Aurélio. In January 2024, he joined Spanish Primera Federación – Group 2 club CD Castellón.

On 27 August 2026, Aurélio was loaned to SD Huesca for one year.
