= Deni Hočko =

Montenegrin footballer (born 1994)

Deni Hočko Дени Хочко
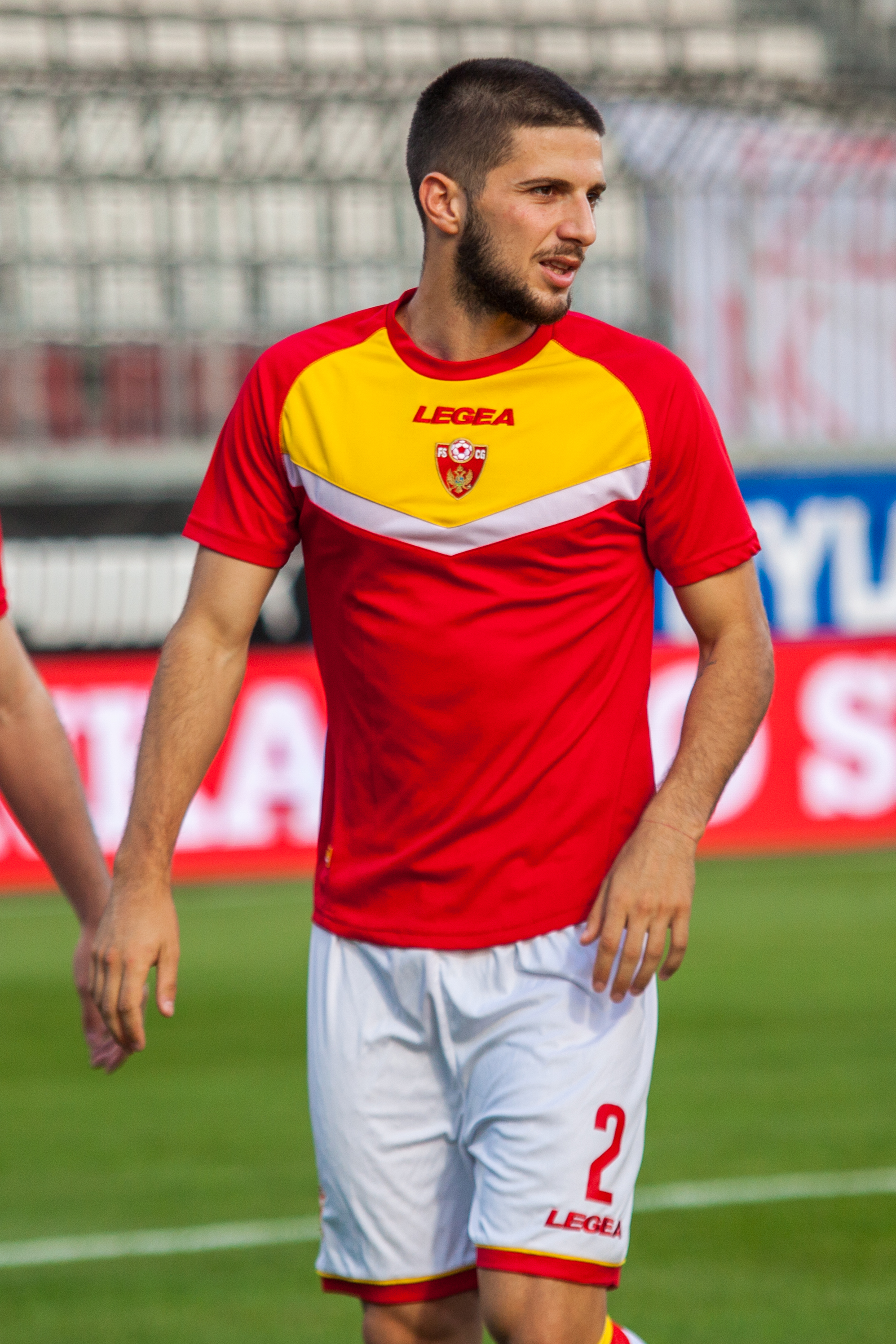
- Hočko with Montenegro in 2019

Personal information
- Date of birth: 22 April 1994 (age 32)
- Place of birth: Cetinje, FR Yugoslavia
- Height: 1.75 m (5 ft 9 in)
- Position: Midfielder

Team information
- Current team: Sutjeska
- Number: 44

Senior career*
| Years | Team | Apps | (Gls) |
| 2011–2013 | Lovćen | 26 | (0) |
| 2013–2017 | Budućnost | 117 | (7) |
| 2017–2019 | Famalicão | 63 | (1) |
| 2019–2021 | Mouscron | 53 | (1) |
| 2021–2023 | Pafos | 34 | (0) |
| 2023 | Beitar Jerusalem | 3 | (0) |
| 2024 | Košice | 9 | (0) |
| 2024–2025 | Karmiotissa | 29 | (0) |
| 2025 | Egaleo | 10 | (1) |
| 2026– | Sutjeska | 14 | (1) |

International career^{‡}
| 2010 | Montenegro U17 | 2 | (0) |
| 2012 | Montenegro U19 | 3 | (0) |
| 2013–2015 | Montenegro U21 | 7 | (0) |
| 2018– | Montenegro | 5 | (0) |
- * Club domestic league appearances and goals as of 1 June 2026 ‡ National team caps and goals as of 03:55, 15 November 2019 (UTC)

Deni Hočko (Serbian Cyrillic: Дени Хочко; born 22 April 1994) is a Montenegrin professional footballer who plays as a central midfielder for Sutjeska and the Montenegro national football team.

== Club career ==
=== Budućnost ===
Hočko was born in Cetinje, Montenegro. He joined Budućnost from his hometown club Lovćen in 2013. In his first season at the club, Budućnost fielded the youngest team in the entire Montenegrin First League that season. One teammate at Budućnost belonging to Hočko's generation was Momčilo Raspopović, who was also born in 1994. They both ended up playing together in Montenegro's national team from 2019.

=== Famalicão ===
On 21 July 2017, Hočko signed a two-year contract with Portuguese club Famalicão. In his second season at the club, Famalicão finished in second place in the 2018–19 LigaPro, earning promotion to Portugal's Primeira Liga for the first time since the 1993–94 season.

=== Mouscron ===
On 28 June 2019, Hočko signed a three-year contract with Belgian club Royal Excel Mouscron.

=== Pafos ===
On 14 July 2021, he moved to Pafos in Cyprus for an undisclosed fee.

=== Beitar Jerusalem ===
On 23 August 2023 signed for the Israeli Premier League club Beitar Jerusalem.

== International career ==
On 28 May 2018, Hočko made his debut for Montenegro under coach Ljubiša Tumbaković in a 0–0 tie with Bosnia and Herzegovina.
