= Filip Majchrowicz =

Polish footballer

Personal information
- Full name: Filip Majchrowicz
- Date of birth: 9 February 2000 (age 26)
- Place of birth: Olsztyn, Poland
- Height: 1.94 m (6 ft 4 in)
- Position: Goalkeeper

Team information
- Current team: Radomiak Radom
- Number: 1

Youth career
- –2016: Stomil Olsztyn
- 2016–2018: Polonia Warsaw

Senior career*
| Years | Team | Apps | (Gls) |
| 2018–2021 | Cracovia | 0 | (0) |
| 2019 | → Resovia (loan) | 3 | (0) |
| 2020 | Cracovia II | 5 | (0) |
| 2021–2024 | Radomiak Radom | 44 | (0) |
| 2022–2023 | → Pafos (loan) | 0 | (0) |
| 2023 | → IK Sirius (loan) | 0 | (0) |
| 2024–2025 | Górnik Zabrze | 12 | (0) |
| 2024 | Górnik Zabrze II | 2 | (0) |
| 2025– | Radomiak Radom | 34 | (0) |

International career
| 2021 | Poland U21 | 1 | (0) |
- * Club domestic league appearances and goals as of 22:20, 29 May 2026 (UTC)

Filip Majchrowicz (born 9 February 2000) is a Polish professional footballer who plays as a goalkeeper for Ekstraklasa club Radomiak Radom.

== Honours ==
Individual

- Ekstraklasa Young Player of the Month: November 2021
