= 2022–23 Watford F.C. season =

English football team season

Watford
2022–23 season
- Owner: Gino Pozzo
- Chairman: Scott Duxbury
- Head Coach: Rob Edwards (until 26 September); Slaven Bilić (from 26 September to 7 March); Chris Wilder (from 7 March)
- Stadium: Vicarage Road
- Championship: 11th
- FA Cup: Third round
- EFL Cup: Second round
- Top goalscorer: League: João Pedro (11); All: João Pedro (11)
- Highest home attendance: 20,204 v Millwall, Championship, 26 December 2022
- Lowest home attendance: 8,891 v Milton Keynes Dons, EFL Cup, 23 August 2022
Home colours	Away colours	Third colours

The 2022–23 season was the 124th season in the existence of Watford Football Club and the club's first season back in the Championship since the 2020–21 following their relegation from the Premier League in the previous season. In addition to the league, they also competed in the FA Cup and the EFL Cup.

== Players ==
=== Current squad ===
As of 8 May 2023

Squad No.	Name	Nationality	Position	Date of birth (age)	Since	Ends	Signed from	Apps	Goals
Goalkeepers
1	Daniel Bachmann	(Austria)	GK	9 July 1994 (age 28)	2017	2024	(England) Stoke	86	0
26	Ben Hamer	(England)	GK	20 November 1987 (age 35)	2022	2024	(Wales) Swansea	1	0
35	Maduka Okoye	(Nigeria)	GK	28 August 1999 (age 23)	2022	2027	(Netherlands) Sparta Rotterdam	2	0
Defenders
2	Jeremy Ngakia	(England)	RB	7 September 2000 (age 22)	2020	2024	(England) West Ham	59	0
3	Mario Gaspar	(Spain)	RB	24 November 1990 (age 32)	2022	2024	(Spain) Villarreal	33	0
13	João Ferreira	(Portugal)	RB	22 March 2001 (age 22)	2023	2027	(Portugal) Benfica	5	1
14	Hassane Kamara	(Ivory Coast)	LB	5 March 1994 (age 29)	2022	2023	(Italy) Udinese (on loan)	51	1
15	Craig Cathcart	(Northern Ireland)	CB	6 February 1989 (age 34)	2014	2023	(England) Blackpool	262	8
22	Ryan Porteous	(Scotland)	CB	25 March 1999 (age 24)	2023	2027	(Scotland) Hibernian	17	2
27	Christian Kabasele	(Belgium)	CB	24 February 1991 (age 32)	2016	2024	(Belgium) Genk	166	7
30	Kortney Hause	(England)	CB	16 July 1995 (age 27)	2022	2023	(England) Aston Villa (on loan)	3	0
31	Francisco Sierralta	(Chile)	CB	6 May 1997 (age 26)	2020	2027	(Italy) Udinese	57	2
42	James Morris	(England)	LB	23 November 2001 (age 21)	2021	2026	(England) Southampton	15	0
44	Wesley Hoedt	(Netherlands)	CB	6 March 1994 (age 29)	2023	2025	(Belgium) Anderlecht	15	1
57	Ryan Andrews	(England)	RB	26 August 2004 (age 18)	2012	2024	(England) Academy	7	0
Midfielders
4	Hamza Choudhury	(England)	CM	1 October 1997 (age 25)	2022	2023	(England) Leicester (on loan)	37	0
6	Imran Louza	(Morocco)	CM	1 May 1999 (age 24)	2021	2028	(France) Nantes	43	5
8	Tom Cleverley	(England)	CM	12 August 1989 (age 33)	2017	2023	(England) Everton	181	19
11	Ismaël Koné	(Canada)	CM	16 June 2002 (age 20)	2023	2027	(Canada) Montréal	17	0
12	Ken Sema	(Sweden)	LM	30 September 1993 (age 29)	2018	2026	(Sweden) Östersunds	127	11
16	Dan Gosling	(England)	CM	1 February 1990 (age 33)	2021	2023	(England) Bournemouth	37	3
18	Yáser Asprilla	(Colombia)	AM	19 November 2003 (age 19)	2022	2026	(Colombia) Envigado	39	1
24	Tom Dele-Bashiru	(Nigeria)	CM	17 September 1999 (age 23)	2019	2025	(England) Manchester City	11	1
25	Leandro Bacuna	(Curaçao)	CM	21 August 1991 (age 31)	2022	2023	(Wales) Cardiff	15	0
39	Edo Kayembe	(Democratic Republic of the Congo)	CM	3 June 1998 (age 24)	2022	2026	(Belgium) Eupen	35	0
Forwards
7	Keinan Davis	(England)	ST	13 February 1998 (age 25)	2022	2023	(England) Aston Villa (on loan)	34	7
10	João Pedro	(Brazil)	ST	26 September 2001 (age 21)	2020	2028	(Brazil) Fluminense	109	24
21	Henrique Araújo	(Portugal)	ST	19 January 2002 (age 21)	2023	2023	(Portugal) Benfica (on loan)	8	0
23	Ismaïla Sarr	(Senegal)	RW	25 February 1998 (age 25)	2019	2024	(France) Rennes	131	34
28	Samuel Kalu	(Nigeria)	RW	26 August 1997 (age 25)	2022	2025	(France) Bordeaux	13	0
34	Britt Assombalonga	(Democratic Republic of the Congo)	ST	6 December 1992 (age 30)	2023	2023	(Turkey) Adana Demirspor	15	2
37	Matheus Martins	(Brazil)	LW	16 July 2003 (age 19)	2023	2023	(Italy) Udinese (on loan)	6	0
49	Michael Adu-Poku	(England)	ST	22 September 2005 (age 17)	2018	2024	(England) Academy	2	0
50	Adrian Blake	(England)	LW	15 July 2005 (age 17)	2013	2023	(England) Academy	3	0
53	Jack Grieves	(England)	ST	5 December 2004 (age 18)	2020	2023	(England) Academy	3	0
54	Tobi Adeyemo	(England)	ST	14 March 2005 (age 18)	2018	2026	(England) Academy	5	1

== Transfers ==
=== Transfers in ===
Date	Position	Nationality	Name	From	Fee	Ref.
19 May 2022	DF	(England)	Scott Holding	(England) Stockport County	Undisclosed	
2 July 2022	CF	(Ivory Coast)	Vakoun Issouf Bayo	(Belgium) Sporting Charleroi	Undisclosed	
6 July 2022	DM	(England)	Luigi Gaspar	(England) Arsenal	Free Transfer	
12 July 2022	CF	(Albania)	Rey Manaj	(Spain) Barcelona	Undisclosed	
19 July 2022	GK	(England)	Ben Hamer	(Wales) Swansea City	Free Transfer	
29 July 2022	RB	(Spain)	Mario Gaspar	(Spain) Villarreal	Free Transfer	
4 August 2022	DM	(England)	Max Delyfer	(England) Potters Bar Town	Free Transfer	
15 November 2022	CB	(Australia)	Aidan Coyne	(Australia) Perth Glory	Free Transfer	
14 December 2022	CM	(Curaçao)	Leandro Bacuna	(Wales) Cardiff City	Free Transfer	
1 January 2023	CM	(Canada)	Ismaël Koné	(Canada) Montréal	Undisclosed	
7 January 2023	RB	(Portugal)	João Ferreira	(Portugal) Benfica	Undisclosed	
13 January 2023	FW	(England)	James Collins	(England) Hertford Town	Undisclosed	
13 January 2023	MF	(England)	Jordan Fankwe	(England) Mickleover	Undisclosed	
13 January 2023	CM	(England)	Zak Fraser-Grante	(England) Hampton & Richmond Borough	Undisclosed	
13 January 2023	FW	(England)	David Hamiga	(England) Beaconsfield Town	Undisclosed	
13 January 2023	CF	(Italy)	Ezio Touray	(England) Basingstoke Town	Undisclosed	
27 January 2023	CB	(Scotland)	Ryan Porteous	(Scotland) Hibernian	Undisclosed	
29 January 2023	CF	(Democratic Republic of the Congo)	Britt Assombalonga	(Turkey) Adana Demirspor	Free Transfer	
31 January 2023	CB	(Netherlands)	Wesley Hoedt	(Belgium) Anderlecht	Undisclosed	

=== Transfers out ===
Date	Position	Nationality	Name	To	Fee	Ref.
21 June 2022	CF	(Colombia)	Cucho Hernández	(United States) Columbus Crew	Undisclosed	
24 June 2022	RW	(Denmark)	Philip Zinckernagel	(Greece) Olympiacos	Undisclosed	
30 June 2022	CB	(Netherlands)	Derek Agyakwa	(England) Port Vale	Released	
30 June 2022	GK	(England)	Dante Baptiste	(England) Wealdstone	Released	
30 June 2022	DF	(England)	Jack Broome	Unattached	Released	
30 June 2022	CB	(England)	Jack Burchell	Unattached	Released	
30 June 2022	CF	(Republic of Ireland)	Ryan Cassidy	Unattached	Released	
30 June 2022	CF	(England)	Jimiel Chikukwa	Unattached	Released	
30 June 2022	CM	(Sierra Leone)	Kamil Conteh	(England) Middlesbrough	Released	
30 June 2022	CM	(Bermuda)	Kane Crichlow	(Greece) Episkopi	Released	
30 June 2022	GK	(Republic of Ireland)	Rob Elliot	(England) Gateshead	Released	
30 June 2022	GK	(England)	Ben Foster	Retired	N/A	
30 June 2022	CF	(Jamaica)	Andre Gray	(Greece) Aris Thessaloniki	Released	
30 June 2022	DF	(England)	Will Hall	Unattached	Released	
30 June 2022	MF	(Australia)	Jordan Harrison	Unattached	Released	
30 June 2022	MF	(England)	Dominic Hutchinson	(England) Wealdstone	Released	
30 June 2022	CB	(Kosovo)	Andi Janjeva	Unattached	Released	
30 June 2022	SS	(Norway)	Joshua King	(Turkey) Fenerbahçe	Released	
30 June 2022	CM	(Slovakia)	Juraj Kucka	(Slovakia) Slovan Bratislava	Released	
30 June 2022	CB	(England)	George Langston	(England) Eastleigh	Released	
30 June 2022	CF	(England)	Kyreece Lisbie	(England) Brentford	Released	
30 June 2022	LW	(England)	Kyrell Lisbie	Unattached	Released	
30 June 2022	FW	(England)	Freddie Moriarty	Unattached	Released	
30 June 2022	MF	(England)	Enoch Muwonge	Unattached	Released	
30 June 2022	CB	(Cameroon)	Nicolas Nkoulou	(Greece) Aris Thessaloniki	Released	
30 June 2022	CB	(Republic of Ireland)	Josh O'Brien	(England) Salford City	Released	
30 June 2022	GK	(England)	Adam Parkes	(England) Plymouth Argyle	Released	
30 June 2022	CM	(Trinidad and Tobago)	Daniel Phillips	(Scotland) St Johnstone	Released	
30 June 2022	RW	(Spain)	Maurizio Pochettino	(Spain) Gimnàstic	Released	
30 June 2022	MF	(England)	Ben Smith	Unattached	Released	
30 June 2022	CM	(England)	Henry Wise	(United States) New York Red Bulls	Released	
1 July 2022	CM	(France)	Moussa Sissoko	(France) Nantes	Undisclosed	
13 July 2022	CF	(Turkey)	Tiago Cukur	(Turkey) Fenerbahçe	Undisclosed	
18 July 2022	LB	(Morocco)	Adam Masina	(Italy) Udinese	Undisclosed	
28 July 2022	RB	(Spain)	Kiko Femenía	(Spain) Villarreal	Undisclosed	
11 August 2022	GK	(Sweden)	Pontus Dahlberg	(Sweden) IFK Göteborg	Undisclosed	
13 August 2022	CB	(Brazil)	Samir	(Mexico) Tigres UANL	Undisclosed	
14 August 2022	LW	(Nigeria)	Emmanuel Dennis	(England) Nottingham Forest	Undisclosed	
23 August 2022	LB	(Ivory Coast)	Hassane Kamara	(Italy) Udinese	Undisclosed	
1 September 2022	CF	(Venezuela)	Adalberto Peñaranda	(Portugal) Boavista	Mutual Consent	
1 September 2022	LB	(England)	Danny Rose	Unattached	Mutual Consent	
3 September 2022	CF	(Scotland)	Dapo Mebude	(Belgium) KV Oostende	Undisclosed	
30 January 2023	GK	(Scotland)	Vincent Angelini	(England) Brentford	Undisclosed	
8 February 2023	CF	(Albania)	Rey Manaj	Unattached	Mutual Consent	

=== Loans in ===
Date from	Position	Nationality	Name	From	Date until	Ref.
10 August 2022	CM	(England)	Hamza Choudhury	(England) Leicester City	End of Season	
13 August 2022	CF	(England)	Keinan Davis	(England) Aston Villa	End of Season	
22 August 2022	CB	(England)	Kortney Hause	(England) Aston Villa	End of Season	
23 August 2022	LB	(Ivory Coast)	Hassane Kamara	(Italy) Udinese	End of Season	
13 January 2023	LW	(Brazil)	Matheus Martins	(Italy) Udinese	End of Season	
23 January 2023	CF	(Portugal)	Henrique Araújo	(Portugal) Benfica	End of Season	

=== Loans out ===
Date from	Position	Nationality	Name	To	Date until	Ref.
2 July 2022	CM	(Colombia)	Juergen Elitim	(Spain) Racing Santander	End of Season	
11 July 2022	CB	(Colombia)	Jorge Segura	(Colombia) Independiente Medellín	End of Season	
29 July 2022	LW	(Germany)	Kwadwo Baah	(Germany) Fortuna Düsseldorf	End of Season	
3 August 2022	AM	(England)	JJ McKiernan	(England) Eastleigh	1 January 2023	
8 August 2022	GK	(England)	Myles Roberts	(England) Welling United	End of Season	
12 August 2022	CF	(England)	Ashley Fletcher	(England) Wigan Athletic	End of Season	
16 August 2022	AM	(Portugal)	Domingos Quina	(Spain) Elche	31 January 2023 (Note: On 31 January, Qunia was recalled from Elche and loaned to Rotherham)	
1 September 2022	RW	(Argentina)	Ignacio Pussetto	(Italy) Sampdoria	End of Season	
15 October 2022	RB	(England)	Scott Holding	(England) Stalybridge Celtic	15 November 2022	
28 November 2022	FW	(England)	Tobi Adeyemo	(England) Hitchin Town	25 December 2022	
28 December 2022	CF	(England)	Shaq Forde	(England) York City	End of Season	
16 January 2023	RW	(England)	Joseph Hungbo	(England) Huddersfield Town	End of Season	
24 January 2023	CB	(Nigeria)	William Troost-Ekong	(Italy) Salernitana	End of Season	
25 January 2023	CM	(Northern Ireland)	JJ McKiernan	(England) Eastleigh	End of Season	
29 January 2023	CB	(England)	Mattie Pollock	(Scotland) Aberdeen	End of Season	
30 January 2023	CF	(Ivory Coast)	Vakoun Issouf Bayo	(Belgium) Sporting Charleroi	End of Season	
31 January 2023	CM	(Portugal)	Domingos Quina	(England) Rotherham United	End of Season	
8 February 2023	GK	(South Africa)	Roraigh Browne	(England) Chertsey Town	4 March 2023	
14 February 2023	DF	(Romania)	Bogdan Marian	(England) AFC Rushden & Diamonds	30 April 2023	
20 February 2023	MF	(England)	Ethan Goulding	(England) Oxhey Jets	30 April 2023	
20 February 2023	FW	(England)	Damani Hunter	(England) Grays Athletic	30 April 2023	
24 March 2023	CF	(Italy)	Ezio Touray	(England) Maidstone United	End of Season	

== Pre-season and friendlies ==
Win Draw Loss

On June 24, Watford announced their pre-season schedule, which included a training camp in Austria. A replacement fixture for the Austria training camp was confirmed, against Panathinaikos.

2 July 2022 Friendly	Watford	1–3	Cambridge United	St Albans
13:00 BST	Morris	Report	Knibbs; Ironside x2	Stadium: Watford Football Club Training Ground; Attendance: 0 (behind-closed-doors)

10 July 2022 Friendly	Panathinaikos	0–0	Watford	Walchsee, Austria
13:30 CEST		Report		Stadium: Kaiserwinkle Arena

12 July 2022 Friendly	Watford	0–2	Bolton Wanderers	St Albans
15:00 BST		Report	Lee 14'; Afolayan 43'	Stadium: Watford Football Club Training Ground; Attendance: 0 (behind-closed-doors)

16 July 2022 Friendly	Watford	4–1	Wycombe Wanderers	St Albans
13:00 BST	Sarr 2' (pen.), 50'; Dennis 52'; Asprilla 90'	Report	Tafazolli 67'	Stadium: Watford Football Club Training Ground; Attendance: 0 (behind-closed-doors)

23 July 2022 Friendly	Watford	0–0	Southampton	Ruislip
15:00 BST		Report		Stadium: Grosvenor Vale; Referee: Sunny Gill; Assistant referees: Bhupinder Gill; Steve Durnell

26 November 2022 Friendly	Watford	1–1	Blackpool	Marbella, Spain
TBA CET	Davis 43'	Report	Carey 13'	Stadium: TBA

3 December 2022 Friendly	Arsenal	2–4	Watford	London Colney
15:00 GMT	Marquinhos 28'; Nketiah 38'	Report	Davis 35', 50'; Asprilla 59'; Pedro 77'	Stadium: Arsenal Training Centre; Attendance: 0 (Behind-closed-doors)

== Competitions ==
=== Overall record ===
Competition	First match	Last match	Starting round	Final position	Record							
Competition	First match	Last match	Starting round	Final position	Pld	W	D	L	GF	GA	GD	Win %
Championship	1 August 2022	8 May 2023	Matchday 1	11th	46	16	15	15	56	53	+3	34.78
FA Cup	7 January 2023		Third round	Third round	1	0	0	1	0	2	−2	0.00
EFL Cup	23 August 2022		Second round	Second round	1	0	0	1	0	2	−2	0.00
Total					48	16	15	17	56	57	−1	33.33

Last updated: 8 May 2023
Source: Soccerway

=== Championship ===
==== League table ====
Pos	Team	Pld	W	D	L	GF	GA	GD	Pts
8	Millwall	46	19	11	16	57	50	+7	68
9	West Bromwich Albion	46	18	12	16	59	53	+6	66
10	Swansea City	46	18	12	16	68	64	+4	66
11	Watford	46	16	15	15	56	53	+3	63
12	Preston North End	46	17	12	17	45	59	−14	63
13	Norwich City	46	17	11	18	57	54	+3	62
14	Bristol City	46	15	14	17	55	56	−1	59

Source: EFL Official Website
Rules for classification: 1) Points; 2) Goal difference; 3) Number of goals scored; 4) Head-to-head results; 5) Wins; 6) Away goals; 7) Penalty points (sec 9.5); 8) 12-point sending off offences

==== Results summary ====
Overall								Home						Away					
Pld	W	D	L	GF	GA	GD	Pts	W	D	L	GF	GA	GD	W	D	L	GF	GA	GD
46	16	15	15	56	53	+3	63	11	6	6	35	23	+12	5	9	9	21	30	−9

Last updated: 8 May 2023.
Source: Soccerway

==== Results by round ====
Round	1	2	3	4	5	6	7	8	9	10	11	12	13	14	15	16	17	18	19	20	21	22	23	24	25	26	27	28	29	30	31	32	33	34	35	36	37	38	39	40	41	42	43	44	45	46
Ground	H	A	H	A	A	H	H	A	A	H	A	H	A	H	A	H	H	A	H	H	A	H	A	H	A	A	H	H	A	A	H	A	H	A	H	A	H	H	A	H	A	H	H	A	A	H
Result	W	D	W	D	D	L	W	D	L	D	W	L	L	W	L	W	W	W	L	W	D	D	W	L	L	W	W	D	L	D	D	D	W	L	D	L	W	D	L	L	D	W	L	L	D	W
Position	7	6	3	3	2	7	4	6	10	10	7	10	12	10	15	12	10	6	7	5	4	5	4	4	5	4	3	3	4	5	6	6	5	8	9	11	10	10	11	12	12	12	12	13	13	11

Updated to match(es) played on 8 May 2023. Source: Soccerway
A = Away; H = Home; W = Win; D = Draw; L = Loss; P = Postponed

==== Matches ====
Win Draw Loss Fixtures

On 23 June, the league fixtures were announced.

1 August 2022 1	Watford	1–0	Sheffield United	Watford
20:00 BST	Sierralta (yellow card) 25'; Cleverley (yellow card) 45+2'; João Pedro (yellow card) 49', (goal) 56'; Kamara (yellow card) 90+5'	Report	Clark (yellow card) 14'; Fleck (yellow card) 24'; Berge (yellow card) 90+2'	Stadium: Vicarage Road; Attendance: 19,536; Referee: Josh Smith

8 August 2022 2	West Bromwich Albion	1–1	Watford	West Bromwich
20:00 BST	Molumby (yellow card) 45'; Grant 45+2'; Furlong (yellow card) 69'	Report	Sarr 12', (penalty missed) 73'; Kabasele (yellow card) 74'	Stadium: The Hawthorns; Attendance: 22,365; Referee: Tim Robinson

12 August 2022 3	Watford	1–0	Burnley	Watford
20:00 BST	Cleverley 45+2'; Kamara (red card) 81'; Asprilla (yellow card) 88'	Report	Brownhill (yellow card) 85'	Stadium: Vicarage Road; Attendance: 19,225; Referee: Thomas Bramall

16 August 2022 4	Birmingham City	1–1	Watford	Bordesley
19:45 BST	Hall 19'; Sanderson (yellow card) 81'	Report	Choudhury (yellow card) 45+3'; Manaj 63'	Stadium: St Andrew's Stadium; Attendance: 16,811; Referee: David Webb

20 August 2022 5	Preston North End	0–0	Watford	Preston
15:00 BST	Brady (yellow card) 79'; Cunningham (yellow card) 90+3'	Report	Manaj (yellow card) 37'; Cathcart (yellow card) 83'	Stadium: Deepdale; Attendance: 15,317; Referee: Darren Bond

27 August 2022 6	Watford	2–3	Queens Park Rangers	Watford
15:00 BST	Sema 27'; Pedro (yellow card) 40', (goal) 50'; Kayembe (yellow card) 45+4'; Kamara (yellow card) 84'; Kabasele (yellow card) 90'	Report	Chair 18'; Willock 34'; Johansen (yellow card) 44'; Adomah 70'; Dieng (yellow card) 81'; Dozzell (yellow card) 85'	Stadium: Vicarage Road; Attendance: 19,977; Referee: Keith Stroud

30 August 2022 7	Watford	2–1	Middlesbrough	Watford
19:45 BST	Sarr 24'; Sierralta (yellow card) 61'; Choudhury (yellow card) 90+2'; Bayo 90+3'	Report	Muniz 4'; Crooks (yellow card) 38'; Jones (yellow card) 82'; McNair (yellow card) 87'; McGree (yellow card) 90+2'	Stadium: Vicarage Road; Attendance: 20,022; Referee: Chris Kavanagh

3 September 2022 8	Rotherham United	1–1	Watford	Rotherham
15:00 BST	Wood 2'; Peltier (yellow card) 27'; Wiles (yellow card) 32'	Report	Bayo 33'; Asprilla (yellow card) 41'; Kayembe (yellow card) 66'	Stadium: New York Stadium; Attendance: 10,607; Referee: Leigh Doughty

13 September 2022 9	Blackburn Rovers	2–0	Watford	Blackburn
19:45 BST	Hyam (yellow card) 24', (goal) 82'; Hedges 38', (yellow card) 79'	Report		Stadium: Ewood Park; Attendance: 11,803; Referee: Steve Martin

17 September 2022 10	Watford	2–2	Sunderland	Watford
15:00 BST	Davis 34'; O'Nien 62' (o.g.)	Report	Alese 45'; Roberts (yellow card) 59'; Evans (yellow card) 61'; Bennette 87', (yellow card) 88'; Matete (yellow card) 90+5'	Stadium: Vicarage Road; Attendance: 19,767; Referee: John Busby

2 October 2022 11	Stoke City	0–4	Watford	Stoke-on-Trent
12:00 BST	Fosu (yellow card) 14'; Delap (yellow card) 52'	Report	Sarr 12'; Bachmann (yellow card) 32'; Asprilla (yellow card) 48'; Sema 64' (yellow card) 65'; Sierralta (yellow card) 69'; Davis 78'; Bayo 84'; Choudhury (yellow card) 90+3'	Stadium: Bet365 Stadium; Attendance: 19,905; Referee: Josh Smith

5 October 2022 12	Watford	1–2	Swansea City	Watford
19:45 BST	Sarr 34'; Louza (yellow card) 90+12'	Report	Ntcham 52'; Grimes (yellow card) 67'; Cabango 90+8'; Darling (yellow card) 90+14'; Fulton (yellow card) 90+16'; Latibeaudiere (yellow card) 90+17'; Wood (yellow card) 90+18'	Stadium: Vicarage Road; Attendance: 17,231; Referee: Tim Robinson

8 October 2022 13	Blackpool	3–1	Watford	Blackpool
15:00 BST	Madine 10'; Thompson (yellow card) 51'; Yates 81' 85'	Report	Louza 29' (yellow card) 88'	Stadium: Bloomfield Road; Attendance: 11,567; Referee: Bobby Madley

15 October 2022 14	Watford	2–1	Norwich City	Watford
19:45 BST	Louza (penalty missed) 13' 18'; Davis 31'; Kamara (yellow card) 74'	Report	Aarons (yellow card) 43'; Sargent 45'	Stadium: Vicarage Road; Attendance: 19,400; Referee: Darren England

19 October 2022 15	Millwall	3–0	Watford	Bermondsey
19:45 BST	Bradshaw 8' 26' 33'	Report	Davis (yellow card) 22'; Kamara (yellow card) 56'	Stadium: The Den; Attendance: 12,787; Referee: David Webb

23 October 2022 16	Watford	4–0	Luton Town	Watford
12:00 BST	Davis 3' (yellow card) 29'; Troost-Ekong 45' (yellow card) 45+1'; Pedro 57'; Sema (yellow card) 67'; Sarr 79'	Report	Bradley (yellow card) 18'; Doughty (yellow card) 51'; Campbell (yellow card) 59'; Cornick (yellow card) 67'; Osho (red card) 83'	Stadium: Vicarage Road; Attendance: 19,282; Referee: Bobby Madley

29 October 2022 17	Wigan Athletic	0–1	Watford	Wigan
15:00 BST	Darikwa (yellow card) 14'; Shinnie (yellow card) 62'	Report	Sierralta (yellow card) 42'; Choudhury (yellow card) 77'; Pedro 87'	Stadium: DW Stadium; Attendance: 10,642; Referee: Matt Donohue

2 November 2022 18	Cardiff City	1–2	Watford	Leckwith
19:45 GMT	Kipré 9'; Nkounkou (yellow card) 40'; Wintle (yellow card) 77'	Report	Sierralta 38'; Sarr 59'; Sema (yellow card) 77'; Gaspar (yellow card) 82'	Stadium: Cardiff City Stadium; Attendance: 17,036; Referee: Keith Stroud

5 November 2022 19	Watford	0–1	Coventry City	Watford
15:00 GMT	Sierralta (yellow card) 69'; Choudhury (yellow card) 74'; Kamara (yellow card) 83'; Bachmann (yellow card) 90+6'	Report	Gyökeres 50'; Eccles (yellow card) 60'; Wilson (yellow card) 90+5'	Stadium: Vicarage Road; Attendance: 20,164; Referee: Leigh Doughty

8 November 2022 20	Watford	2–0	Reading	Watford
20:00 GMT	Pedro 15' (pen.), 87'; Asprilla (yellow card) 34'; Sema (yellow card) 49'	Report	Ejaria (yellow card) 38'; Rahman (yellow card) 73'; Loum (yellow card) 78'	Stadium: Vicarage Road; Attendance: 18,847; Referee: James Linington
Note: The match, originally scheduled for 10 September 2022, was postponed as a mark of respect following the passing of Queen Elizabeth II.

12 November 2022 21	Bristol City	0–0	Watford	Ashton Gate
15:00 GMT	Scott (yellow card) 88'	Report	Gaspar (yellow card) 53'	Stadium: Ashton Gate; Attendance: 23,501; Referee: David Webb

11 December 2022 22	Watford	0–0	Hull City	Watford
15:00 GMT		Report	Woods (yellow card) 19'; Greaves (yellow card) 36'; Christie (yellow card) 44'; Jones (yellow card) 50'	Stadium: Vicarage Road; Attendance: 18,846; Referee: Dean Whitestone

17 December 2022 23	Huddersfield Town	0–2	Watford	Huddersfield
15:00 GMT	Diarra (yellow card) 17'; Hogg (yellow card) 20'	Report	Bacuna (yellow card) 28'; Pedro 54', 86'; Sema (yellow card) 81'	Stadium: John Smith's Stadium; Attendance: 18,434; Referee: Leigh Doughty

26 December 2022 24	Watford	0–2	Millwall	Watford
12:00 GMT	Bacuna (yellow card) 10'; Kamara (red card) 38'; Bachmann (yellow card) 90+4'	Report	Voglsammer 22'; Saville (yellow card) 28'; McNamara (yellow card) 39'; Long (yellow card) 63'; Flemming 83'	Stadium: Vicarage Road; Attendance: 20,204; Referee: Joshua Smith

30 December 2022 25	Swansea City	4–0	Watford	Landore
19:45 GMT	Grimes (yellow card) 9'; Darling (yellow card) 28'; Piroe 39', 78'; Fulton (yellow card) 60'; Latibeauduere (yellow card) 64', (goal) 87'; Cullen 74'	Report	Kalu (yellow card) 70'; Bachmann (yellow card) 71'	Stadium: Swansea.com Stadium; Attendance: 17,339; Referee: John Busby

2 January 2023 26	Norwich City	0–1	Watford	Norwich
15:00 GMT	Gibbs (yellow card) 18'; Hanley (yellow card) 45'	Report	Ngakia (yellow card) 4'; Morris (yellow card) 49'; Sierralta (yellow card) 68'; Bayo 86'	Stadium: Carrow Road; Attendance: 26,587; Referee: James Linington

14 January 2023 27	Watford	2–0	Blackpool	Watford
15:00 GMT	Gaspar (yellow card) 41'; Ferreira (yellow card) 64'; Adeyemo 72'; Sarr 87' (pen.)	Report	Husband (yellow card) 86'; Maxwell (yellow card) 86'; Patino (yellow card) 88'	Stadium: Vicarage Road; Attendance: 19,679; Referee: Gavin Ward

21 January 2023 28	Watford	1–1	Rotherham United	Watford
15:00 GMT	Mario Gaspar (yellow card) 39'; Bachmann (yellow card) 45+7'; Ferreira 53'; Sierralta (yellow card) 90+2'	Report	Ferguson 20', (yellow card) 45+6'; Hjelde (yellow card) 30'; Peltier (yellow card) 90+5'	Stadium: Vicarage Road; Attendance: 18,911; Referee: David Webb

28 January 2023 29	Middlesbrough	2–0	Watford	Middlesbrough
15:00 GMT	Akpom 36'; Howson (yellow card) 44'; Forss 45+3'	Report	Cathcart (yellow card) 38'; Adeyemo (yellow card) 90+2'	Stadium: Riverside Stadium; Attendance: 25,469; Referee: Darren Bond

4 February 2023 30	Reading	2–2	Watford	Reading
15:00 GMT	Mbengue (yellow card) 32'; Ince 66' (pen.); Hendrick 80'; Holmes (yellow card) 84'; Loum (yellow card) 87'	Report	Sarr 30'; Porteous 48'; Martins (yellow card) 64'; Kamara (yellow card) 76'; Pedro (yellow card) 90+4'; Choudhury (yellow card) 90+5'	Stadium: Select Car Leasing Stadium; Attendance: 13,861; Referee: Steve Martin

11 February 2023 31	Watford	1–1	Blackburn Rovers	Watford
15:00 GMT	Choudhury (yellow card) 36'; Hoedt 74'; Kamara (yellow card) 90+3'	Report	Dack 24'; Thomas (yellow card) 31'; Rankin-Costello (yellow card) 59'; Buckley (yellow card) 90'; Gallagher (yellow card) 90+6'	Stadium: Vicarage Road; Attendance: 19,294; Referee: Jeremy Simpson

14 February 2023 32	Burnley	1–1	Watford	Burnley
20:00 GMT	Roberts (yellow card) 12'; Barnes (yellow card) 58'; Obafemi (yellow card) 90+2', (goal) 90+5'	Report	Pedro 32', (yellow card) 85'; Kamara (yellow card) 35'; Koné (yellow card) 70'	Stadium: Turf Moor; Attendance: 18,393; Referee: Leigh Doughty

20 February 2023 33	Watford	3–2	West Bromwich Albion	Watford
20:00 GMT	Sema 23'; Hoedt (yellow card) 31'; Choudhury (yellow card) 46'; Sarr 66'; Pieters 78' (o.g.)	Report	Pieters (yellow card) 55'; Townsend 56'; Wallace 72'; Molumby (yellow card) 76'	Stadium: Vicarage Road; Attendance: 18,634; Referee: Tim Robinson

25 February 2023 34	Sheffield United	1–0	Watford	Sheffield
15:00 GMT	Ahmedhodžić (yellow card) 17'; Lowe (yellow card) 34'; Porteous 73' (o.g.)	Report	Hoedt (yellow card) 12'; Porteous (yellow card) 51'; Koné (yellow card) 70'	Stadium: Bramall Lane; Attendance: 29,132; Referee: Keith Stroud

5 March 2023 35	Watford	0–0	Preston North End	Watford
15:00 GMT	Louza (yellow card) 90+5'	Report	Evans (yellow card) 47'; Diaby (yellow card) 51'; Potts (yellow card) 85'; Woodman (yellow card) 89'	Stadium: Vicarage Road; Attendance: 19,244; Referee: Gavin Ward

11 March 2023 36	Queens Park Rangers	1–0	Watford	Shepherd's Bush
15:00 GMT	Iroegbunam 15', (yellow card) 61'; Lowe (yellow card) 44'	Report	Choudhury (yellow card) 45+1'; Hoedt (yellow card) 90+6'	Stadium: Loftus Road Stadium; Attendance: 17,247; Referee: James Linington

14 March 2023 37	Watford	3–0	Birmingham City	Watford
19:45 GMT	Louza 6'; Davis 16', (yellow card) 52'; Assombalonga 73'	Report	Jutkiewicz (yellow card) 61'; Long (yellow card) 66'; Dean (yellow card) 80'	Stadium: Vicarage Road; Attendance: 18,403; Referee: Darren England

18 March 2023 38	Watford	1–1	Wigan Athletic	Watford
15:00 GMT	Davis 45', (yellow card) 89'; Louza (yellow card) 90+6'	Report	Power (yellow card) 29'; Rekik (yellow card) 29'; Sinani (yellow card) 45+3'; McClean 51'; Darikwa (yellow card) 67'	Stadium: Vicarage Road; Attendance: 18,523; Referee: Graham Scott

1 April 2023 39	Luton Town	2–0	Watford	Luton
12:30 BST	Osho 28'; Drameh (yellow card) 90+1'; Campbell 90+1'; Mpanzu (yellow card) 90+2'	Report	Pedro (yellow card) 45+1'; Choudhury (yellow card) 78'; Louza (yellow card) 90+5'	Stadium: Kenilworth Stadium; Attendance: 10,046; Referee: Josh Smith

7 April 2023 40	Watford	2–3	Huddersfield Town	Watford
15:00 BST	Porteous (yellow card) 14'; Asprilla 32'; Pedro (yellow card) 54'; Assombalonga 90+2'; Choudhury (yellow card) 90+3'; Bachmann (yellow card) 90+7' (yellow-red card) 90+7'	Report	Rudoni 44'; Pearson 55'; Kasumu (yellow card) 60'; Harratt 82'; Hogg (yellow card) 90+3'	Stadium: Vicarage Road; Attendance: 19,511; Referee: David Webb

10 April 2023 41	Coventry City	2–2	Watford	Coventry
15:00 BST	McFadzean (yellow card) 14'; Eccles (yellow card) 45+3'; McNally (yellow card) 45+3'; Godden 58'; Sheaf 72'	Report	Pedro 6'; Choudhury (yellow card) 36'; Louza 45+1', (yellow card) 62'; Andrews (yellow card) 54'; Bacuna (yellow card) 59'; Hoedt (yellow card) 88'	Stadium: CBS Arena; Attendance: 21,112; Referee: Keith Stroud

15 April 2023 42	Watford	2–0	Bristol City	Watford
15:00 BST	Cornick 6' (o.g.); Pedro 54'; Porteous (yellow card) 61'	Report	Tanner (yellow card) 27'; James (yellow card) 84'; Mehmeti (yellow card) 90+4'	Stadium: Vicarage Road; Attendance: 19,148; Referee: Dean Whitestone

19 April 2023 43	Watford	1–3	Cardiff City	Watford
19:45 BST	Sarr 11'; Hoedt (yellow card) 40'; Davis (yellow card) 74'; Ngakia (yellow card) 77'	Report	Etete 31', (yellow card) 39'; Kipré 35'; Kaba 41'; Ralls (yellow card) 57'; O'Dowda (yellow card) 58'	Stadium: Vicarage Road; Attendance: 17,005; Referee: Jarred Gillett

22 April 2023 44	Hull City	1–0	Watford	Kingston upon Hull
15:00 BST	Tufan 25' (pen.); Coyle (yellow card) 60'; Ebiowei (yellow card) 79'; Woods (yellow card) 90+4'	Report	Louza (yellow card) 72'; Pedro (yellow card) 79'	Stadium: MKM Stadium; Attendance: 20,666; Referee: Oliver Langford

29 April 2023 45	Sunderland	2–2	Watford	Sunderland
15:00 BST	Clarke (yellow card) 65'; O'Nien 70', (yellow card) 78'; Diallo (yellow card) 84'; Roberts 90+5'	Report	Choudhury (yellow card) 10'; Kabasele 17'; Porteous (yellow card) 19', (goal) 69'; Davis (yellow card) 65'	Stadium: Stadium of Light; Attendance: 44,944; Referee: Gavin Ward

8 May 2023 46	Watford	2–0	Stoke City	Watford
15:00 BST	Louza 70'; Davis 74'	Report	Pearson (yellow card) 52'; Tymon (yellow card) 76'	Stadium: Vicarage Road; Attendance: 20,100; Referee: Lewis Smith

=== FA Cup ===
The Hornets were drawn away to Reading in the third round.

Win Draw Loss

7 January 2023 Third round	Reading	2–0	Watford	Reading
12:30 GMT	Hutchinson (yellow card) 13'; Abrefa 45+3'; Mbengue (yellow card) 69'; Long 90+3'	Report	Morris (yellow card) 59'; Adu-Poku (yellow card) 86'	Stadium: Select Car Leasing Stadium; Attendance: 7,954; Referee: Peter Bankes

=== EFL Cup ===
Watford entered in the second round and were drawn at home to Milton Keynes Dons.

Win Draw Loss

23 August 2022 Second round	Watford	0–2	Milton Keynes Dons	Watford
19:45 BST		Report	Dennis 45'; Burns 53'; Devoy (yellow card) 76'; Oyegoke (yellow card) 79'	Stadium: Vicarage Road; Attendance: 8,891; Referee: Andy Woolmer

== Statistics ==
=== Appearances and goals ===
As of 8 May 2023

No.	Pos.	Nat.	Name	League		FA Cup		EFL Cup		Total		Discipline	
No.	Pos.	Nat.	Name	Apps	Goals	Apps	Goals	Apps	Goals	Apps	Goals	A yellow rectangle, denoting the yellow penalty card shown to a player being cautioned	A red rectangle, denoting the red penalty card shown to a player being sent off
1	GK	AUT	Daniel Bachmann	45	0	0	0	0	0	45	0	5	1
2	DF	ENG	Jeremy Ngakia	10+4	0	0	0	0	0	10+4	0	2	0
3	DF	ESP	Mario Gaspar	18+13	0	1	0	1	0	20+13	0	4	0
4	MF	ENG	Hamza Choudhury	36	0	0	0	0+1	0	36+1	0	14	0
6	MF	MAR	Imran Louza	16+5	5	0	0	0	0	16+5	5	7	0
7	FW	ENG	Keinan Davis	27+7	7	0	0	0	0	27+7	7	6	0
8	MF	ENG	Tom Cleverley	3+1	1	0	0	0	0	3+1	1	1	0
10	FW	BRA	João Pedro	31+4	11	0	0	0	0	31+4	11	7	0
11	MF	CAN	Ismaël Koné	13+3	0	1	0	0	0	14+3	0	1	0
12	MF	SWE	Ken Sema	36+4	4	0	0	0+1	0	36+5	4	5	0
13	DF	POR	João Ferreira	3+2	1	0	0	0	0	3+2	1	1	0
14	DF	CIV	Hassane Kamara	30+2	0	0	0	0	0	30+2	0	8	2
15	DF	NIR	Craig Cathcart	26+2	0	0	0	1	0	27+2	0	2	0
16	MF	ENG	Dan Gosling	9+8	0	0	0	1	0	10+8	0	0	0
18	MF	COL	Yáser Asprilla	14+23	1	1	0	1	0	16+23	1	4	0
21	FW	POR	Henrique Araújo	3+5	0	0	0	0	0	3+5	0	0	0
22	DF	SCO	Ryan Porteous	17	2	0	0	0	0	17	2	5	0
23	FW	SEN	Ismaïla Sarr	36+3	10	0	0	0	0	36+3	10	0	0
24	MF	NGA	Tom Dele-Bashiru	4+2	0	0	0	0	0	4+2	0	0	0
25	MF	CUW	Leandro Bacuna	10+4	0	0+1	0	0	0	10+5	0	3	0
26	GK	ENG	Ben Hamer	1	0	0	0	0	0	1	0	0	0
27	DF	BEL	Christian Kabasele	21+4	1	0	0	0	0	21+4	1	2	0
28	FW	NGA	Samuel Kalu	2+7	0	0	0	0	0	2+7	0	1	0
30	DF	ENG	Kortney Hause	2+1	0	0	0	0	0	2+1	0	0	0
31	DF	CHI	Francisco Sierralta	17+1	1	1	0	0+1	0	18+2	1	7	0
34	FW	COD	Britt Assombalonga	1+10	2	0	0	0	0	1+10	2	0	0
35	GK	NGA	Maduka Okoye	0	0	1	0	1	0	2	0	0	0
37	FW	BRA	Matheus Martins	4+2	0	0	0	0	0	4+2	0	1	0
39	MF	COD	Edo Kayembe	19+2	0	0	0	1	0	20+2	0	2	0
42	DF	ENG	James Morris	6+6	0	1	0	0+1	0	7+7	0	1	0
44	DF	NED	Wesley Hoedt	14+1	1	0	0	0	0	14+1	1	5	0
49	FW	ENG	Michael Adu-Poku	0+1	0	1	0	0	0	1+1	0	0	0
50	FW	ENG	Adrian Blake	0+1	0	1	0	0+1	0	1+2	0	0	0
53	FW	ENG	Jack Grieves	0+2	0	0+1	0	0	0	0+3	0	0	0
54	FW	ENG	Tobi Adeyemo	0+4	1	0+1	0	0	0	0+5	1	1	0
57	DF	ENG	Ryan Andrews	6	0	0+1	0	0	0	6+1	0	1	0
Players who went out on loan or left permanently but made appearances for Watford prior to departing
5	DF	NGA	William Troost-Ekong	12+3	1	1	0	1	0	14+3	1	1	0
9	FW	ALB	Rey Manaj	2+4	1	0	0	1	0	3+4	1	1	0
19	FW	CIV	Vakoun Bayo	9+15	4	0	0	1	0	10+15	4	0	0
25	FW	NGA	Emmanuel Dennis	2	0	0	0	0	0	2	0	0	0
32	DF	ENG	Mattie Pollock	1+2	0	1	0	1	0	3+2	0	0	0
36	FW	ENG	Joseph Hungbo	0+7	0	1	0	1	0	2+7	0	0	0

=== Goalscorers ===
As of 8 May 2023

Rank	Pos.	No.	Player	Championship	FA Cup	EFL Cup	Total
1	FW	10	(Brazil) João Pedro	11	0	0	11
2	FW	23	(Senegal) Ismaïla Sarr	10	0	0	10
3	FW	7	(England) Keinan Davis	7	0	0	7
4	MF	6	(Morocco) Imran Louza	5	0	0	5
5	MF	12	(Sweden) Ken Sema	4	0	0	4
5	FW	19	(Ivory Coast) Vakoun Bayo	4	0	0	4
7	DF	22	(Scotland) Ryan Porteous	2	0	0	2
7	FW	34	(Democratic Republic of the Congo) Britt Assombalonga	2	0	0	2
9	DF	5	(Nigeria) William Troost-Ekong	1	0	0	1
9	MF	8	(England) Tom Cleverley	1	0	0	1
9	FW	9	(Albania) Rey Manaj	1	0	0	1
9	DF	13	(Portugal) João Ferreira	1	0	0	1
9	MF	18	(Colombia) Yáser Asprilla	1	0	0	1
9	DF	27	(Belgium) Christian Kabasele	1	0	0	1
9	DF	31	(Chile) Francisco Sierralta	1	0	0	1
9	DF	44	(Netherlands) Wesley Hoedt	1	0	0	1
9	FW	54	(England) Tobi Adeyemo	1	0	0	1
Own goals				2	0	0	2
Total				56	0	0	56

=== Assists ===
As of 8 May 2023

Rank	Pos.	No.	Player	Championship	FA Cup	EFL Cup	Total
1	MF	12	(Sweden) Ken Sema	9	0	0	9
2	FW	23	(Senegal) Ismaïla Sarr	7	0	0	7
3	MF	6	(Morocco) Imran Louza	4	0	0	4
3	FW	10	(Brazil) João Pedro	4	0	0	4
5	FW	7	(England) Keinan Davis	2	0	0	2
5	DF	14	(Ivory Coast) Hassane Kamara	2	0	0	2
5	MF	18	(Colombia) Yáser Asprilla	2	0	0	2
8	MF	11	(Canada) Ismaël Koné	1	0	0	1
8	DF	15	(Northern Ireland) Craig Cathcart	1	0	0	1
8	FW	19	(Ivory Coast) Vakoun Bayo	1	0	0	1
8	FW	21	(Portugal) Henrique Araújo	1	0	0	1
8	DF	22	(Scotland) Ryan Porteous	1	0	0	1
8	MF	24	(Nigeria) Tom Dele-Bashiru	1	0	0	1
8	FW	37	(Brazil) Matheus Martins	1	0	0	1

=== Clean sheets ===
As of 8 May 2023

No.	Player	Championship	FA Cup	EFL Cup	Total
1	(Austria) Daniel Bachmann	16	0	0	16
Total		16	0	0	16

== See also ==
- 2022–23 in English football
- List of Watford F.C. seasons
