= Kwadwo Baah =

German footballer (born 2003)

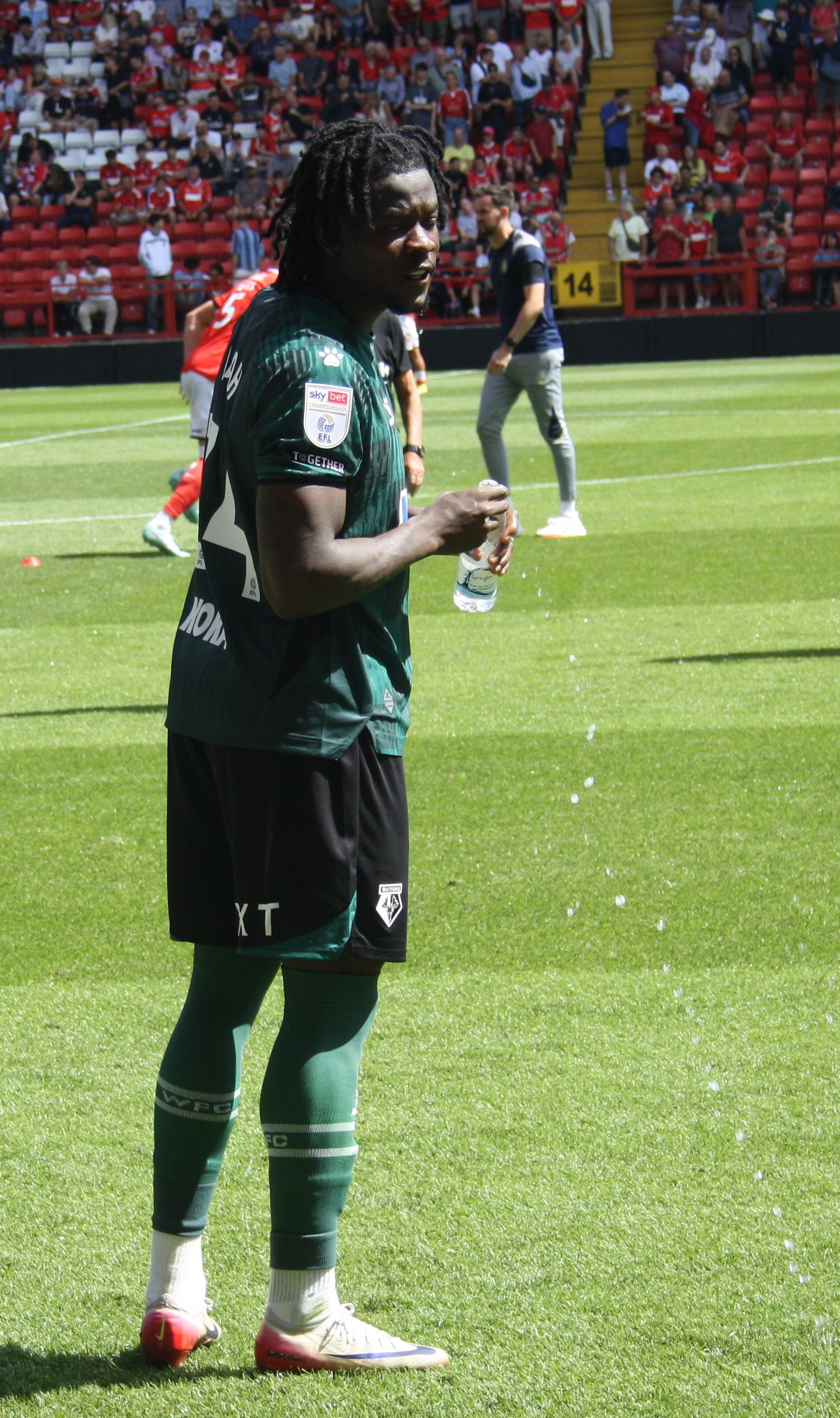
- Baah playing for Watford in 2025

Personal information
- Full name: Kwadwo Kyeremeh Baah
- Date of birth: 27 January 2003 (age 23)
- Place of birth: Horb am Neckar, Germany
- Height: 6 ft 0 in (1.83 m)
- Positions: Forward; winger

Team information
- Current team: Watford
- Number: 14

Youth career
- 2012–2013: Moonshot
- 2013–2017: Crystal Palace
- 2017–2019: Kinetic Academy

Senior career*
Years	Team	Apps	(Gls)
2019	Whyteleafe	1	(0)
2019–2021	Rochdale	37	(3)
2021–	Watford	46	(5)
2022–2023	→ Fortuna Düsseldorf (loan)	7	(0)
2023–2024	→ Burton Albion (loan)	20	(2)

International career
2021	England U18	1	(0)
2021–2022	Germany U19	4	(2)
- * Club domestic league appearances and goals as of 31 January 2026 (UTC)

Kwadwo Kyeremeh Baah (born 27 January 2003) is a German professional footballer who plays as a forward or winger for EFL Championship club Watford. Having played for Germany internationally at youth level, He has also represented the England U18 national team.

== Early life ==
Kwadwo Kyeremeh Baah was born on 27 January 2003 in Horb am Neckar, Germany to Ghanaian parents. At a young age, he was raised in South Norwood, England, which eventually made him eligible to represent England.

== Club career ==
=== Early career ===
In October 2016, aged 13, whilst Baah was at Crystal Palace, he caused controversy as a ball boy in a match against fellow London rivals West Ham United when he tried to stop the opponents time wasting by placing the ball in the six yard area for West Ham goalkeeper Adrián. Baah was released by Crystal Palace at 14. He has credited that moment as a disciplinary factor in his development, admitting he didn't take many things seriously and knew he needed to change.

Baah played one game for Whyteleafe in August 2019, who were managed by Kinetic Academy founder Harry Hudson. He also had a trial with Fulham.

=== Rochdale ===
On 20 September 2019, at the age of 16, Baah signed to a scholarship contract at Rochdale. Baah made his first team league debut for Rochdale on 1 October, appearing as an 82nd minute substitute for Aaron Wilbraham in an EFL Trophy match at home to Bolton Wanderers.

He scored his first professional goal in a 5–0 win at Wigan Athletic on 15 December 2020. In February 2021, Baah was named EFL Young Player of the Month for January.

=== Watford ===
On 1 February 2021, Baah was close to signing a pre-contract agreement with Manchester City, however the deal later collapsed. Having undergone a medical with Watford at the end of April and a fee of £125,000 agreed, he officially joined the club on 17 May ahead of their return to the Premier League.

On 13 August 2024, three years after signing for the club, Baah made his debut for Watford in a 5–0 EFL Cup win against MK Dons. He came on as a substitute for Rocco Vata in the 62nd minute and marked his debut by scoring just two minutes later.

==== Fortuna Düsseldorf (loan) ====
On 29 July 2022, Baah joined a German club for the first time, signing for 2. Bundesliga club Fortuna Düsseldorf on loan for the 2022–23 season.

==== Burton Albion (loan) ====
On 18 August 2023, Baah joined EFL League One club Burton Albion on loan for the 2023–24 season.

== International career ==
On 29 March 2021, Baah made his debut for England U18s during a 2–0 win away to Wales at the Leckwith Stadium. He was also called up to take part in an England U19s training camp in May 2021 at St George's Park.

Baah was called up by Germany for the first time to represent their U19 side against Slovakia under-19's on 6 October 2021, followed by games against Portugal and the Netherlands youth squads.

== Career statistics ==
As of 31 January 2026

Appearances and goals by club, season and competition
Club	Season	League			FA Cup		League Cup		Other		Total	
Club	Season	Division	Apps	Goals	Apps	Goals	Apps	Goals	Apps	Goals	Apps	Goals
Whyteleafe	2019–20	Isthmian League South East Division	1	0	0	0	0	0	0	0	1	0
Rochdale	2019–20	League One	7	0	1	0	0	0	2 (Note: Appearances in EFL Trophy)	0	10	0
Rochdale	2020–21	League One	30	3	0	0	2	0	2	0	34	3
Rochdale	Total		37	3	1	0	2	0	4	0	44	3
Watford	2021–22	Premier League	0	0	0	0	0	0	0	0	0	0
Watford	2022–23	Championship	0	0	0	0	0	0	0	0	0	0
Watford	2023–24	Championship	0	0	0	0	0	0	0	0	0	0
Watford	2024–25	Championship	27	4	1	0	3	1	0	0	31	5
Watford	2025–26	Championship	19	1	1	0	1	1	0	0	21	2
Watford	Total		46	5	2	0	4	2	0	0	52	7
Fortuna Düsseldorf (loan)	2022–23	2. Bundesliga	7	0	0	0	0	0	0	0	7	0
Burton Albion (loan)	2023–24	League One	20	2	0	0	0	0	1	0	21	2
Career total			111	10	3	0	6	2	5	0	125	12
