= Tom Dele-Bashiru =

Nigerian footballer (born 1999)

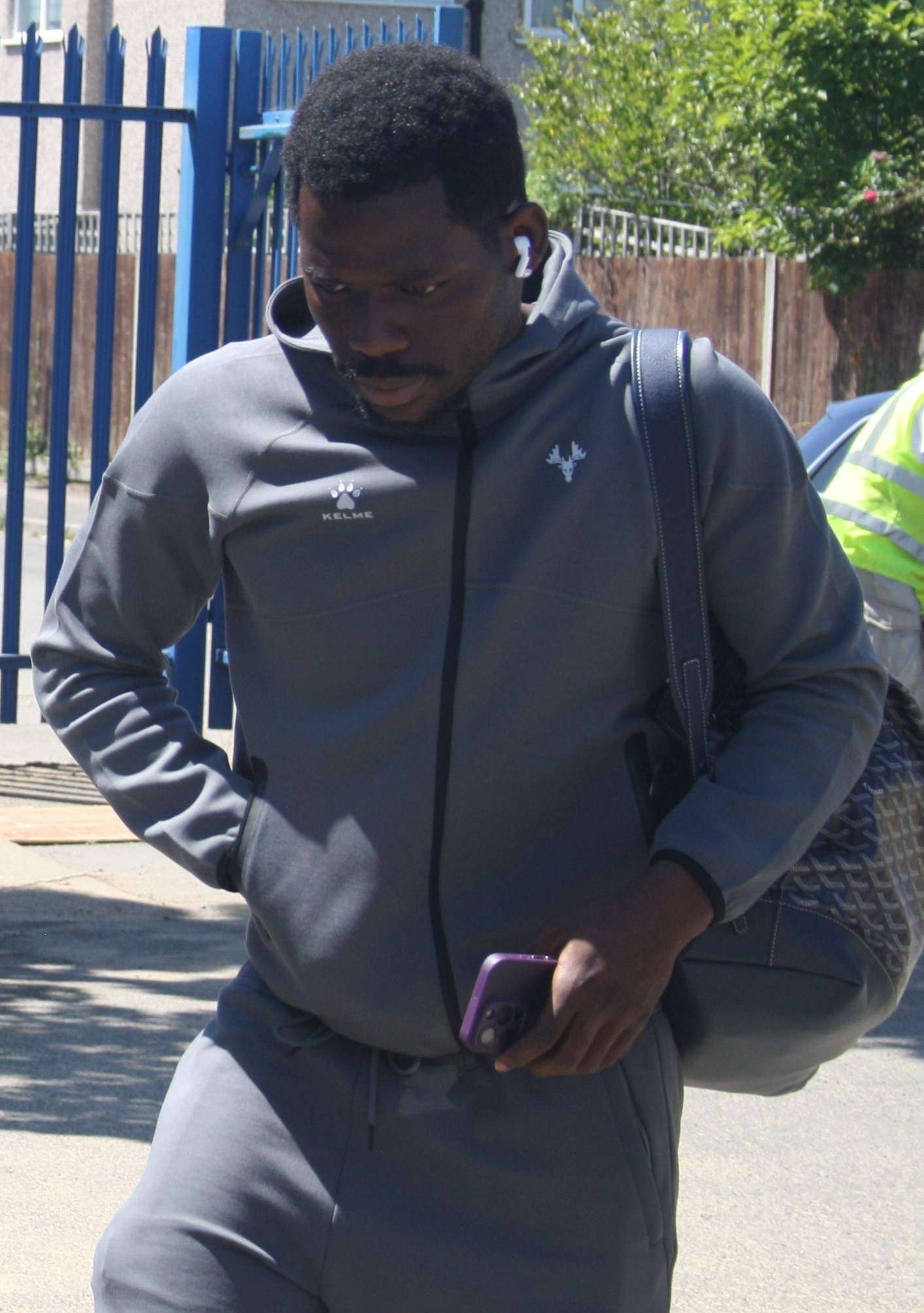
- Tom Dele-Bashiru in 2025.

Personal information
- Full name: Ayotomiwa Sherif Dele-Bashiru
- Date of birth: 17 September 1999 (age 27)
- Place of birth: Manchester, England
- Height: 6 ft 0 in (1.83 m)
- Position: Defensive midfielder

Team information
- Current team: Aris
- Number: 20

Youth career
- 2005–2017: Manchester City

Senior career*
Years	Team	Apps	(Gls)
2017–2019	Manchester City	0	(0)
2019–2026	Watford	71	(6)
2021–2022	→ Reading (loan)	38	(4)
2025–2026	→ Gençlerbirliği (loan)	28	(0)
2026–	Aris	4	(0)

International career^{‡}
2014	England U16	2	(0)
2019	Nigeria U20	3	(1)
2019	Nigeria U23	1	(1)
- * Club domestic league appearances and goals as of 13 September 2026 ‡ National team caps and goals as of 6 September 2020

Ayotomiwa Sherif "Tom" Dele-Bashiru (born 17 September 1999) is a professional footballer who plays as a defensive midfielder for Super League Greece club Aris. Born in England, Dele-Bashiru represents Nigeria internationally.

== Club career ==
Dele-Bashiru made his professional debut for Manchester City on 19 December 2017 in the EFL Cup against Leicester City, replacing Phil Foden in the 91st minute and playing in extra time.

On 24 July 2019, Dele-Bashiru joined Watford on a six-year deal after his contract with Manchester City expired. He made his Watford debut and scored the opening goal in a 3–3 draw against Tranmere Rovers in the FA Cup third round.

On his first league start, Dele-Bashiru came off injured in the first-half against Reading on 3 October 2020. It was confirmed that he would undergo surgery for an anterior cruciate ligament injury and would be out for around six months.

After returning to training and representing the Hornets during the pre-season in Summer 2021, Dele-Bashiru joined Reading on a season-long loan, in order to get more playing time and fully restore his fitness. He scored his first goals for Reading when he scored twice against Peterborough United on 14 September 2021 in a 3–1 win.

On 12 September 2025, Dele-Bashiru joined Süper Lig club Gençlerbirliği on a season-long loan.

On 22 May 2026, Watford said it had triggered a one-year extension to his contract.

== International career ==
Dele-Bashiru has represented the England under-16 team, but he is also eligible for Nigeria. He was part of the Nigeria national under-20 football team in the 2019 FIFA U-20 World Cup in Poland. Dele-Bashiru scored Nigeria's third goal in their opening match win against Qatar, with the game finishing 4–0.

== Personal life ==
Dele-Bashiru's younger brother Fisayo also came through the ranks at Manchester City before joining Sheffield Wednesday.

== Career statistics ==
As of match played 18 April 2026

Appearances and goals by club, season and competition
Club	Season	League			FA Cup		EFL Cup		Europe		Other		Total	
Club	Season	Division	Apps	Goals	Apps	Goals	Apps	Goals	Apps	Goals	Apps	Goals	Apps	Goals
Manchester City U21	2017–18	—			—		—		—		3 (Note: Appearances in EFL Trophy)	0	3	0
Manchester City U21	2018–19	—			—		—		—		5	1	5	1
Manchester City U21	Total		—		—		—		—		8	1	8	1
Manchester City	2017–18	Premier League	0	0	0	0	1	0	0	0	—		1	0
Manchester City	2018–19	Premier League	0	0	0	0	0	0	0	0	—		0	0
Manchester City	Total		0	0	0	0	1	0	0	0	—		1	0
Watford	2019–20	Premier League	0	0	2	1	1	0	—		—		3	1
Watford	2020–21	Championship	2	0	0	0	0	0	—		—		2	0
Watford	2021–22	Premier League	0	0	0	0	0	0	—		—		0	0
Watford	2022–23	Championship	6	0	0	0	0	0	—		—		6	0
Watford	2023–24	Championship	35	2	2	1	1	0	—		—		38	3
Watford	2024–25	Championship	27	4	0	0	3	0	—		—		30	4
Watford	2025–26	Championship	1	0	0	0	1	0	—		—		2	0
Watford	Total		71	6	4	2	6	0	—		—		81	8
Reading (loan)	2021–22	Championship	38	4	1	0	0	0	—		—		39	4
Gençlerbirliği (loan)	2025–26	Süper Lig	25	0	0	0	—		—		—		25	0
Career total			134	10	5	2	7	0	0	0	8	1	154	12
