= 2024–25 Watford F.C. season =

English football team season

Watford
2024–25 season
- Owner: Gino Pozzo
- Chairman: Scott Duxbury
- Head Coach: Tom Cleverley
- Stadium: Vicarage Road
- Championship: 14th
- FA Cup: Third round
- EFL Cup: Third round
- Top goalscorer: League: Vakoun Issouf Bayo (10); All: Vakoun Issouf Bayo (10)
- Highest home attendance: 20,696
- Lowest home attendance: 16,397
- Average home league attendance: 19,973
Home colours	Away colours	Third colours

The 2024–25 season is the 126th season in the history of Watford and their third consecutive season in the Championship. The club are participating in the Championship, the FA Cup, and the EFL Cup.

== Current squad ==
As of 3 February 2025

No.	Name	Position	Nationality	Date of birth (age)	Signed from	Since	Fee	Ends	Apps	Goals
Goalkeepers
1	Daniel Bachmann	GK	(Austria)	9 July 1994 (age 30)	Stoke City	2017	Free Transfer	2028	120	0
23	Jonathan Bond	GK	(England)	19 May 1993 (age 31)	Free Agent	2024 (Note: Bond re-signed for Watford playing 33 games between 2012-2015.)	Free Transfer	2025	35	0
Defenders
2	Jeremy Ngakia	RB	(England)	7 September 2000 (age 23)	West Ham United	2020	Free Transfer	2027	76	0
3	Francisco Sierralta	CB	(Chile)	6 May 1997 (age 27)	Udinese	2020	Undisclosed	2027	94	2
5	Ryan Porteous	CB	(Scotland)	25 March 1999 (age 25)	Hibernian	2023	£500,000	2027	60	5
6	Mattie Pollock	CB	(England)	28 September 2001 (age 22)	Grimsby Town	2021	£300,000	2026	29	1
13	Kayky Almeida	CB	(Brazil)	1 May 2005 (age 19)	Fluminese	2024	Undisclosed	2029	0	0
15	Antonio Tikvić	CB	(Croatia)	21 April 2004 (age 20)	Udinese	2024	Loan	2025	2	0
21	Angelo Ogbonna	CB	(Italy)	23 May 1988 (age 36)	West Ham United	2024	Free	2025	0	0
22	James Morris	LB	(England)	23 November 2001 (age 22)	Southampton	2021	Free Transfer	2026	36	0
25	James Abankwah	CB	(Republic of Ireland)	16 January 2004 (age 21)	Udinese	2024	Loan	2025	0	0
36	Festy Ebosele	RB	(Republic of Ireland)	2 August 2002 (age 22)	Udinese	2024	Loan	2025	0	0
37	Yasser Larouci	LB	(Algeria)	1 January 2001 (age 23)	Troyes	2024	Loan	2025	4	0
45	Ryan Andrews	RB	(England)	26 August 2004 (age 20)	Academy	2012	—	2028	57	4
—	Kévin Keben	CB	(Cameroon)	26 January 2004 (age 20)	Toulouse	2024	Undisclosed	2028	0	0
	Caleb Wiley	LB	(United States)	22 February 2004 (age 23)	Chelsea	2025	Loan	2025	0	0
Midfielders
8	Giorgi Chakvetadze	AM	(Georgia (country))	29 August 1999 (age 24)	Gent	2024	Undisclosed	2027	41	2
10	Imran Louza	CM	(Morocco)	1 May 1999 (age 25)	Nantes	2021	£10,000,000	2028	63	6
11	Rocco Vata	AM	(Republic of Ireland)	18 April 2005 (age 19)	Celtic	2024	Compensation	2028	2	0
14	Pierre Dwomoh	CM	(Belgium)	21 June 2004 (age 20)	Royal Antwerp	2024	Undisclosed	2028	0	0
17	Moussa Sissoko	CM	(France)	16 August 1989 (age 35)	Nantes	2024 (Note: Sissoko re-signed for Watford playing 38 games and scoring 2 goals between 2021-2022.)	Free Transfer	2026	42	3
24	Tom Dele-Bashiru	CM	(Nigeria)	17 September 1999 (age 24)	Manchester City	2019	Free Transfer	2026	55	4
39	Edo Kayembe	CM	(Democratic Republic of the Congo)	3 June 1998 (age 26)	KAS Eupen	2022	£4,700,000	2026	76	8
Forwards
7	Tom Ince	RW	(England)	30 January 1992 (age 32)	Reading	2023	£50,000	2026	33	5
12	Ken Sema	LW	(Sweden)	30 September 1993 (age 30)	Östersunds	2018	Undisclosed	2025	164	12
18	Daniel Jebbison	ST	(Canada)	13 August 2003 (age 21)	AFC Bournemouth	2024	Loan	2025	1	0
19	Vakoun Bayo	ST	(Ivory Coast)	10 January 1997 (age 27)	Udinese	2024 (Note: Bayo was loaned back to Watford after playing 70 games and scoring 12 goals between 2022-2024.)	Loan	2025	71	12
20	Mamadou Doumbia	ST	(Mali)	18 February 2006 (age 18)	Black Stars	2024	Undisclosed	2030	2	0
34	Kwadwo Baah	LW	(Germany)	27 January 2003 (age 21)	Rochdale	2021	Free Transfer	2026	5	1
Out on loan
9	Mileta Rajović	ST	(Denmark)	17 July 1999 (age 25)	Kalmar FF	2023	£1,000,000	2028	48	14
—	Jack Grieves	ST	(England)	5 December 2004 (age 19)	Academy	2020	—	2026	5	0
—	Jorge Hurtado	ST	(Colombia)	6 September 2003 (age 20)	Real Cartagena	2023	Undisclosed	2029	1	0
—	João Ferreira	RB	(Portugal)	22 March 2001 (age 23)	Benfica	2023	£2,500,000	2027	5	1

== Transfers ==
=== In ===
Date	Position	Player	From	Fee	Ref.
1 July 2024 (Note: Transfer was announced on 19 February, but joined the club on 1 July.)	CF	(Mali) Mamadou Doumbia	(Mali) Black Stars	Undisclosed	
3 July 2024	GK	(England) Jonathan Bond	Free agent	—N/a	
5 July 2024	AM	(Republic of Ireland) Rocco Vata	(Scotland) Celtic	Compensation	
10 July 2024	CM	(France) Moussa Sissoko	(France) Nantes	Free	
8 August 2024	CB	(Brazil) Kayky Almeida	(Brazil) Fluminese	Undisclosed	
26 August 2024	CM	(Belgium) Pierre Dwomoh	(Belgium) Royal Antwerp	Undisclosed	
27 August 2024	CB	(Italy) Angelo Ogbonna	(England) West Ham United	Free	
29 August 2024	CB	(Cameroon) Kévin Keben	(France) Toulouse	Undisclosed	
30 August 2024 (Note: On 23 January, Watford announced that Tikvić's season-long loan had been converted into a permanent transfer in August. As they did not give a specific date for the permanent transfer, 30 August, the final day of the English summer transfer window, is listed.)	CB	(Croatia) Antonio Tikvić	(Italy) Udinese	Undisclosed	
27 September 2024	LB	(England) Ian Kamga (Note: Signed initially for the Under-21s.)	(England) Stoke City	Free	
1 January 2025 (Note: Transfer was announced on 4 December, but would join the club on 1 January once the transfer window opens.)	LW	(Republic of Ireland) Nickson Okosun	(Republic of Ireland) Bohemians	Undisclosed	
31 January 2025	GK	(Norway) Egil Selvik	(Italy) Udinese	Undisclosed	
3 February 2025	CB	(England) Travis Akomeah	(England) Chelsea	Undisclosed	

=== Out ===
Date	Pos.	Player	To	Fee	Ref.
28 June 2024	CM	(Canada) Ismaël Koné	(France) Marseille	Undisclosed	
1 August 2024	CM	(Colombia) Óber Almanza	(Romania) Bihor Oradea	Free	
23 August 2024	RW	(Colombia) Yáser Asprilla	(Spain) Girona	Undisclosed	
25 August 2024	CB	(Netherlands) Wesley Hoedt	(Saudi Arabia) Al-Shabab	Undisclosed	
29 August 2024	ST	(Ivory Coast) Vakoun Bayo	(Italy) Udinese	Undisclosed	
30 August 2024	RW	(England) Shaq Forde	(England) Bristol Rovers	Undisclosed	
21 March 2025	CB	(Brazil) Kayky Almeida	(Brazil) Fluminense	Undisclosed	
11 April 2025	GK	(England) Jonathan Bond	(United States) Houston Dynamo	Undisclosed	

=== Loaned in ===
Date	Pos.	Player	From	Date until	Ref.
22 July 2024	CB	(Croatia) Antonio Tikvić	(Italy) Udinese	30 August 2024 (Note: On 23 January, Watford announced that Tikvić's season-long loan had been converted into a permanent transfer in August. As they did not give a specific date for the permanent transfer, 30 August, the final day of the English summer transfer window, is listed.)	
1 August 2024	LB	(Algeria) Yasser Larouci	(France) Troyes	End of season	
29 August 2024	ST	(Ivory Coast) Vakoun Bayo	(Italy) Udinese	End of season	
30 August 2024	CF	(Canada) Daniel Jebbison	(England) AFC Bournemouth	8 January 2025 (Note: On 8 January, Jebbison was recalled from his season-long loan.)	
30 August 2024	RB	(Republic of Ireland) Festy Ebosele	(Italy) Udinese	30 January 2025 (Note: On 30 January, Ebosele was recalled from his season-long loan.)	
16 January 2025	CB	(Republic of Ireland) James Abankwah	(Italy) Udinese	End of season	
3 February 2025	LB	(United States) Caleb Wiley	(England) Chelsea	End of season	

=== Loaned out ===
Date	Pos.	Player	To	Date until	Ref.
24 July 2024	FW	(England) Jack Grieves	(Scotland) Ross County	End of season	
29 July 2024	GK	(England) Myles Roberts	(Scotland) Partick Thistle	End of season	
15 August 2024	CF	(Colombia) Jorge Cabezas Hurtado	(Greece) PAOK	End of season	
2 September 2024	RB	(Portugal) João Ferreira	(Portugal) Braga	End of season	
2 September 2024	CF	(Denmark) Mileta Rajović	(Denmark) Brøndby IF	End of season	
9 September 2024	CB	(England) Joshua Mullins	(England) Bedford Town	5 October 2024	
17 October 2024	CF	(England) Michael Adu-Poku	(England) Solihull Moors	24 January 2025 (Note: On 24 January, Adu-Poku was recalled from his season-long loan.)	
22 October 2024	GK	(South Africa) Roraigh Browne	(England) Bishop's Stortford	19 November 2024	
22 October 2024	CF	(England) Jake Watkiss	(England) Farnborough	13 December 2024 (Note: On 13 December, Watkiss was recalled from his two-month loan at Farnborough, and subsequently joined Needham on loan.)	
25 October 2024	RB	(England) Albert Eames	(England) Chelmsford City	22 November 2024	
19 November 2024	GK	(Sweden) Jonathan Macaulay	(England) Oxford City	17 December 2024	
20 November 2024	CB	(England) Joshua Mullins	(England) Bedford Town	26 April 2025	
22 November 2024	GK	(South Africa) Roraigh Browne	(England) AFC Dunstable	11 January 2025	
29 November 2024	CB	(Scotland) Ali Gould	(England) Kings Langley	28 December 2024	
4 December 2024	CB	(Australia) Aidan Coyne	(England) Maidenhead United	1 January 2025	
6 December 2024	FW	(England) Bentley Assiedou	(England) Kings Langley	2 January 2025	
7 December 2024	CB	(England) Freddie Buers	(England) Potters Bar Town	5 January 2025	
7 December 2024	CB	(Wales) George Abbott	(England) Hendon	5 January 2025	
10 December 2024	CB	(England) James Clarridge	(England) St Albans City	End of season (Note: On 9 January, Clarridge's loan at St Albans, initially set to run until 6 January, was extended until the end of the season.)	
13 December 2024	CF	(England) Jake Watkiss	(England) Needham Market	13 January 2025	
26 December 2024	CF	(England) Jonathan Lawson	(England) Kings Langley	21 January 2025	
17 January 2025	GK	(South Africa) Roraigh Browne	(England) Hendon	13 February 2025	
18 January 2025	CB	(Wales) George Abbott	(England) Potters Bar Town	15 February 2025	
21 January 2025	GK	(England) Sam Morris	(England) Hendon	26 January 2025	
21 January 2025	LM	(Republic of Ireland) Prince Sikiru	(England) Grays Athletic	18 February 2025	
23 January 2025	CB	(Croatia) Antonio Tikvić	(Austria) Grazer AK	End of season	
24 January 2025	CF	(England) Jonathan Lawson	(England) Hitchin Town	20 February 2025	
3 February 2025	CB	(Scotland) Ryan Porteous	(England) Preston North End	End of season	
3 February 2025	GK	(England) Myles Roberts	(England) Bristol Rovers	End of season	
14 February 2025	CB	(Scotland) Ali Gould	(England) Potters Bar Town	14 March 2025	
28 February 2025	CF	(England) Jake Watkiss	(England) Needham Market	26 March 2025	
11 March 2025	RW	(England) Michael Adu-Poku	(England) Rochdale	5 May 2025	
21 March 2025	CB	(Australia) Aidan Coyne	(England) St Albans City	End of Season	
21 March 2025	GK	(Sweden) Jonathan Macaulay	(England) Bedford Town	End of Season	
27 March 2025	RB	(England) Charlie Bolding	(England) Colney Heath	19 April 2025	
27 March 2025	CB	(England) Aaron Burton	(England) Leverstock Green	26 April 2025	

=== Released / Out of Contract ===
Date	Pos.	Player	Subsequent club	Join date	Ref.
30 June 2024	CF	(England) Ashley Fletcher	(England) Blackpool	1 July 2024	
30 June 2024	CM	(England) Yianni Goulandris	(United States) Lancaster FC	1 July 2024	
30 June 2024	GK	(England) Ben Hamer	(England) Sheffield Wednesday	1 July 2024	
30 June 2024	CB	(England) Victor Wachowicz	(United States) Missouri State Bears	1 July 2024	
30 June 2024	RB	(England) Scott Holding	(England) Macclesfield	19 July 2024	
30 June 2024	CF	(England) James Collins	(England) Dulwich Hamlet	2 August 2024	
30 June 2024	DM	(England) Jack Taylor	(England) Bishop Stortford	16 August 2024	
30 June 2024	RB	(England) Hamzat Balogun	(England) Burnley	23 September 2024	
30 June 2024	RW	(Poland) Dawid Hamiga	(England) Badshot Lea	18 December 2024	
30 June 2024	CB	(England) Ben Casey			
30 June 2024	CM	(England) Charlie Davis			
30 June 2024	CM	(Germany) Edward Gyamfi			
30 June 2024	LB	(England) Alfie King			
30 June 2024	DM	(England) Jake Livermore			
30 August 2024	RW	(Nigeria) Samuel Kalu	Free agent	Mutual consent	
29 January 2025	LW	(Sweden) Ken Sema	(Cyprus) Pafos	31 January 2025	

== Pre-season and friendlies ==
On 22 May, Watford announced their initial pre-season schedule, with friendlies against Reading (behind closed doors), Boreham Wood, Stevenage, Gillingham, Wycombe Wanderers and Brentford. On 13 June, they added an away match against Scottish side Hibernian.

Win Draw Loss Fixtures

6 July 2024 Friendly	Watford	0–2	Reading	St Albans
11:00 BST(UTC+1)		Report	Akande 64'; Wareham 72'	Stadium: Watford Football Club Training Ground; Attendance: 0 (behind closed doors)

10 July 2024 Friendly	Boreham Wood	0–1	Watford	Borehamwood
18:00 BST		Report	Grieves 50'	Stadium: Meadow Park
Note: Kickoff was originally scheduled for 19:30 but was set back due to England progressing to the semi-final of EURO 2024.

13 July 2024 Friendly	Stevenage	2–2	Watford	Stevenage
15:00 BST	Piergianni 45'; Sweeney 90+2'	Report	Baah 9'; Louza 50'	Stadium: Broadhall Way; Attendance: 1,966

20 July 2024 Friendly	Gillingham	2–0	Watford	Gillingham
15:00 BST	Trialist 26'; Nolan 69'	Report		Stadium: Priestfield Stadium; Attendance: 2,922; Referee: Sebastian Stockbridge

24 July 2024 Friendly	Hibernian	2–3	Watford	Edinburgh
19:00 BST	Campbell 16'; McKirdy 53'	Report	Louza 30'; Vata 35'; Nabizada} 68'	Stadium: Easter Road; Attendance: 8,659; Referee: Nick Walsh

27 July 2024 Friendly	Fulham	6–1	Watford	Motspur Park
13:00 BST	Lukić; Muniz; Iwobi; Jiménez; Stansfield; Pajaziti	Report		Stadium: Motspur Park Training Ground; Attendance: 0 (Behind-closed-doors)

30 July 2024 Friendly	Wycombe Wanderers	3–2	Watford	High Wycombe
19:30 BST	Lubala 42'; Scowen 48'; Kone 79'	Report	Chakvetadze 13'; Rajović 90+3'	Stadium: Adams Park; Attendance: 3,106; Referee: Craig Hicks

3 August 2024 Friendly	Watford	1–1	Brentford	Watford
15:00 BST	Sissoko 8'	Report	Schade 6'	Stadium: Vicarage Road

== Competitions ==
=== Championship ===
==== League table ====
Pos	Team	Pld	W	D	L	GF	GA	GD	Pts
12	Sheffield Wednesday	46	15	13	18	60	69	−9	58
13	Norwich City	46	14	15	17	71	68	+3	57
14	Watford	46	16	9	21	53	61	−8	57
15	Queens Park Rangers	46	14	14	18	53	63	−10	56
16	Portsmouth	46	14	12	20	58	71	−13	54

Source: English Football League
Rules for classification: 1) Points; 2) Goal difference; 3) Number of goals scored; 4) Head-to-head results; 5) Wins; 6) Away goals; 7) Penalty points (sec 9.5); 8) Number of 12-point sending off offences; 9) Play-off (only if needed to determine promotion/relegation)

==== Results summary ====
Overall								Home						Away					
Pld	W	D	L	GF	GA	GD	Pts	W	D	L	GF	GA	GD	W	D	L	GF	GA	GD
46	16	9	21	53	61	−8	57	12	4	7	27	22	+5	4	5	14	26	39	−13

Last updated: complete.
Source: Soccerway

==== Results by round ====
Round	1	2	3	4	5	6	7	8	9	10	11	12	13	14	15	16	17	18	20	21	22	23	24	25	26	19^{1}	27	28	29	30	31	32	33	34	35	36	37	38	39	40	41	42	43	44	45	46
Ground	A	H	H	A	H	A	H	A	H	A	A	H	A	A	H	A	H	H	A	H	A	H	H	A	H	A	A	H	A	H	A	H	A	H	A	H	H	A	H	A	H	A	H	A	A	H
Result	W	W	W	L	D	L	W	L	W	L	L	W	W	L	W	D	W	D	D	W	L	W	L	L	L	D	W	L	L	L	D	L	W	W	D	L	W	L	D	L	W	L	L	L	L	D
Position	7	3	2	3	5	8	7	8	6	8	9	5	5	6	6	5	5	6	8	7	7	6	7	8	9	8	8	8	9	12	10	13	10	9	10	11	10	10	9	10	10	11	12	12	13	14
Points	3	6	9	9	10	10	13	13	16	16	16	19	22	22	25	26	29	30	31	34	34	37	37	37	37	38	41	41	41	41	42	42	45	48	49	49	52	52	53	53	56	56	56	56	56	57

Source: Soccerway
A = Away; H = Home; W = Win; D = Draw; L = Loss; P = Postponed
Notes:
- ^{1} Matchday 19 (vs. Cardiff City) was postponed due to advice from the Met Office, Cardiff Council and South Wales Police.

==== Matches ====
On 26 June, the Championship fixtures were announced.

Win Draw Loss Fixtures

10 August 2024 1	Millwall	2–3	Watford	Bermondsey
12:30 BST	Leonard (yellow card) 55'; Watmore 74', 88'; Bryan (yellow card) 86'	Report	Sierralta (yellow card) 7'; Kayembe 22', (yellow card) 86'; Chakvetadze 55'; Rajović 90', (yellow card) 90'	Stadium: The Den; Attendance: 16,456; Referee: John Busby

17 August 2024 2	Watford	3–0	Stoke City	Watford
15:00 BST	Bayo (yellow card) 31'; Kayembe 47', 73'; Andrews 49'; Sierralta (yellow card) 88'	Report	Thompson (yellow card) 55'; Laurent (yellow card) 90'	Stadium: Vicarage Road; Attendance: 18,789; Referee: Tom Nield

24 August 2024 3	Watford	2–1	Derby County	Watford
15:00 BST	Bayo 31'; Chakvetadze (yellow card) 45'; Sissoko 76'; Rajović (yellow card) 89'	Report	Adams 2', (yellow card) 50'; Bradley (yellow card) 89'; Nelson (yellow card) 90+5'	Stadium: Vicarage Road; Referee: Geoff Eltringham

1 September 2024 4	Sheffield United	1–0	Watford	Sheffield
15:00 BST	Bachmann 2' (o.g.); Moore (penalty missed) 16'; O'Hare (yellow card) 83'; Ahmedhodžić (yellow card) 85'; Hamer (yellow card) 90+3'; Souttar (yellow card) 90+4'; Cooper (yellow card) 90+5'	Report	Larouci (yellow card) 49'; Sierralta (yellow card) 52'; Jebbison (yellow card) 90+4'	Stadium: Bramall Lane; Attendance: 26,914; Referee: Andrew Kitchen
Note: Fixture was initially scheduled for 31 August, but was moved for live Sky Sports broadcast.

14 September 2024 5	Watford	1–1	Coventry City	Watford
15:00 BST	Pollock (yellow card) 38'; Dele-Bashiru 67'; Porteous (yellow card) 90+12'	Report	Simms 4'; Torp (yellow card) 44'; Latibeaudiere (yellow card) 45'	Stadium: Vicarage Road; Attendance: 19,441; Referee: Bobby Madley

21 September 2024 6	Norwich City	4–1	Watford	Norwich
12:30 BST	Doyle 3'; Sainz 45+3'; Núñez 54'; Fisher (yellow card) 74'; Chrisene 89', (yellow card) 90+1'	Report	Andrews 26'; Jebbison (yellow card) 36'	Stadium: Carrow Road; Attendance: 26,438; Referee: Anthony Backhouse
Note: Fixture was initially scheduled for a 15:00 kick-off, but was moved for live Sky Sports broadcast.

28 September 2024 7	Watford	2–1	Sunderland	Watford
15:00 BST	Ebosele 28', (yellow card) 30'; Dele-Bashiru 84' (pen.)	Report	Bellingham (yellow card) 45'; Isidor 49'	Stadium: Vicarage Road; Attendance: 20,335; Referee: Andy Davies

2 October 2024 8	Preston North End	3–0	Watford	Preston
19:45 BST	Brady (yellow card) 40'; Osmajić 53', 65'; Whiteman (yellow card) 70'; McCann 75'	Report		Stadium: Deepdale; Attendance: 13,602; Referee: Andrew Kitchen

5 October 2024 9	Watford	2–1	Middlesbrough	Watford
15:00 BST	Kayembe 75'; Baah 87', (yellow card) 90+1'; Porteous (yellow card) 89'; Chakvetadze (yellow card) 90+5'	Report	Hackney (yellow card) 23'; Edmundson 54'	Stadium: Vicarage Road; Attendance: 20,002; Referee: Matt Donohue

19 October 2024 10	Luton Town	3–0	Watford	Luton
12:30 BST	Clark 11', (yellow card) 16'; Doughty (yellow card) 35'; Morris 47'; Hashioka (yellow card) 61'; Brown 90+1'	Report	Bayo (yellow card) 6'; Porteous (yellow card) 37'	Stadium: Kenilworth Road; Referee: Stephen Martin
Note: Fixture was initially scheduled for 15:00, but was moved forward due to a police request.

22 October 2024 11	Leeds United	2–1	Watford	Leeds
19:45 BST	Ramazani 4'; Aaronson 7'	Report	Baah 47'	Stadium: Elland Road; Attendance: 34,968; Referee: Anthony Backhouse

26 October 2024 12	Watford	1–0	Blackburn Rovers	Watford
12:30 BST	Sierralta (yellow card) 36'; Chakvetadze (yellow card) 49'; Kayembe (yellow card) 51', (goal) 71'; Baah (yellow card) 55'; Ebosele (yellow card) 88'	Report	Cantwell (yellow card) 68'; Batth (yellow card) 69'; Brittain (yellow card) 90'; Hyam (yellow card) 90+5'	Stadium: Vicarage Road; Attendance: 18,800; Referee: Darren England
Note: Fixture was initially scheduled for 15:00, but was moved for live Sky Sports broadcast.

2 November 2024 13	Sheffield Wednesday	2–6	Watford	Owlerton
15:00 GMT	Smith 26', (yellow card) 34'; Iorfa (yellow card) 57'; Valentín 82'; Lowe (yellow card) 83'	Report	Porteous (yellow card) 25', (goal) 29'; Pollock (yellow card) 42'; Ince 52'; Bayo 58', 67', 84', 88'; Baah (yellow card) 76'	Stadium: Hillsborough Stadium; Referee: Sam Allison

5 November 2024 14	Swansea City	1–0	Watford	Landore
20:00 GMT	Peart-Harris 35', (yellow card) 79'; Grimes (yellow card) 40'; Franco (yellow card) 44'	Report	Ebosele (yellow card) 26'; Sierralta (yellow card) 45'	Stadium: Liberty Stadium; Attendance: 12,869; Referee: Josh Smith
Note: Fixture was initially scheduled for 19:45, but was moved for live Sky Sports broadcast.

8 November 2024 15	Watford	1–0	Oxford United	Watford
20:00 GMT	Porteous (yellow card) 34'; Baah (yellow card) 38'; Bayo 54', (yellow card) 75'; Ebosele (yellow card) 62'; Morris (yellow card) 90+3'	Report	McEachran (yellow card) 45+1'; Moore (yellow card) 75'	Stadium: Vicarage Road; Attendance: 20,268; Referee: Anthony Backhouse
Note: Fixture was initially scheduled for 9 November, but was moved for live Sky Sports broadcast.

22 November 2024 16	Plymouth Argyle	2–2	Watford	Plymouth
20:00 GMT	Mumba (yellow card) 1'; Gray 23', 90+6'; Gibson (yellow card) 54'	Report	Bayo 9'; Porteous 41', (yellow card) 88'	Stadium: Home Park; Referee: Andy Davies
Note: Fixture was initially scheduled for 23 November, but was moved for live Sky Sports broadcast.

26 November 2024 17	Watford	1–0	Bristol City	Watford
19:45 GMT	Sierralta (yellow card) 46'; Andrews 53'; Bayo (yellow card) 80'	Report	Twine (yellow card) 72'; Pring (yellow card) 87'	Stadium: Vicarage Road; Attendance: 17,579; Referee: James Linington

30 November 2024 18	Watford	0–0	Queens Park Rangers	Watford
12:30 GMT	Sierralta (yellow card) 34'; Pollock (yellow card) 54'	Report	Madsen (yellow card) 2'; Smyth (yellow card) 57'; Field (yellow card) 88'	Stadium: Vicarage Road; Attendance: 20,413; Referee: Andrew Kitchen
Note: Fixture was initially scheduled for 15:00, but was moved for live Sky Sports broadcast.

11 December 2024 20	Hull City	1–1	Watford	Kingston upon Hull
19:45 GMT	Palmer (yellow card) 36'; Kamara (yellow card) 80'; Bedia 82'	Report	Louza (yellow card) 36'; Ngakia (yellow card) 43'; Ebosele (yellow card) 78'; Vata 88'	Stadium: MKM Stadium; Attendance: 18,694; Referee: Leigh Doughty

15 December 2024 21	Watford	2–1	West Bromwich Albion	Watford
14:00 GMT	Sissoko (yellow card) 21'; Bayo 35', 50'; Louza (yellow card) 70'	Report	Molumby (yellow card) 53', (goal) 67'; Fellows (yellow card) 81'; Swift (yellow card) 90+8'	Stadium: Vicarage Road; Attendance: 19,774; Referee: Gavin Ward
Note: Fixture was initially scheduled for 14 December, but was moved to give both clubs another day of preparation.

21 December 2024 22	Burnley	2–1	Watford	Burnley
15:00 GMT	Anthony 9'; Laurent (yellow card) 49'; Brownhill 62'; Egan-Riley (yellow card) 64'; Trafford (yellow card) 88'	Report	Ngakia (yellow card) 44'; Baah 88'	Stadium: Turf Moor; Attendance: 19,601; Referee: James Linington

26 December 2024 23	Watford	2–1	Portsmouth	Watford
15:00 GMT	Baah (yellow card) 30', (red card) 90+8'; Kayembe 57' (pen.), (yellow card) 59'; Vata 90+5'	Report	Swanson 10', (yellow card) 75'; Pack (yellow card) 57'; Schmid (yellow card) 59'; Murphy (yellow card) 60'; Lang (yellow card) 64'; Moxon (yellow card) 90'	Stadium: Vicarage Road; Attendance: 20,696; Referee: Geoff Eltringham

29 December 2024 24	Watford	1–2	Cardiff City	Watford
15:00 GMT	Chakvetadze 38'; Louza (yellow card) 60'; Andrews (yellow card) 86'	Report	Robinson 1', 42'; Rinomhota (yellow card) 55'; Chambers (yellow card) 69'; Daland (yellow card) 81'	Stadium: Vicarage Road; Attendance: 19,916; Referee: Sam Allison

1 January 2025 25	Queens Park Rangers	3–1	Watford	Shepherd's Bush
12:30 GMT	Frey 5', (yellow card) 31'; Dunne 37'; Fox (yellow card) 47'; Field 56', (yellow card) 83'; Smyth (yellow card) 86'	Report	Baah 55'; Bachmann (yellow card) 38'; Kayembe (yellow card) 70'; Chakvetadze (yellow card) 82'; Ebosele (yellow card) 89'	Stadium: Loftus Road; Attendance: 17,268; Referee: Stephen Martin
Note: Fixture was initially scheduled for 15:00, but was moved for live Sky Sports broadcast.

4 January 2025 26	Watford	1–2	Sheffield United	Watford
15:00 GMT	Ngakia 20'; Louza (yellow card) 42'; Pollock (yellow card) 45+3'	Report	Hamer 13'; Davies (yellow card) 42'; Brooks 53'	Stadium: Vicarage Road; Attendance: 19,937; Referee: David Webb

14 January 2025 19	Cardiff City	1–1	Watford	Leckwith
19:45 GMT	Ashford 65'; Chambers (yellow card) 90+5'	Report	Ngakia (yellow card) 61'; Pollock (yellow card) 73'; Bayo 87'	Stadium: Cardiff City Stadium; Attendance: 16,942; Referee: Oliver Langford
Note: Fixture was originally scheduled for 7 December, but was postponed following advice received from the Met Office and the recommendations of Cardiff Council and South Wales Police.

18 January 2025 27	Derby County	0–2	Watford	Derby
15:00 GMT	Elder (yellow card) 19'	Report	Abankwah (yellow card) 1'; Louza 4'; Ngakia (yellow card) 31'; Kayembe 66'; Sierralta (yellow card) 90+1'	Stadium: Pride Park Stadium; Attendance: 29,040; Referee: Adam Herczeg

21 January 2025 28	Watford	1–2	Preston North End	Watford
19:45 GMT	Vata 90'	Report	Storey (yellow card) 27'; Osmajić 17', 56'; Þórðarson (yellow card) 71'	Stadium: Vicarage Road; Attendance: 16,397; Referee: Tom Nield

25 January 2025 29	Coventry City	2–1	Watford	Coventry
15:00 GMT	Torp 35', (yellow card) 50', (goal) 75'; Rudoni (yellow card) 87'; Kitching (yellow card) 90'	Report	Kayembe (yellow card) 21'; Morris (yellow card) 51'; Larouci (yellow card) 64'; Kitching 82' (o.g.); Sissoko (yellow card) 90+2'	Stadium: Coventry Building Society Arena; Attendance: 27,078; Referee: Martin Coy

1 February 2025 30	Watford	0–1	Norwich City	Watford
12:30 GMT	Bayo (red card) 35'; Louza (yellow card) 40'; Andrews (yellow card) 77'; Sissoko (yellow card) 89'	Report	Sargent 41'	Stadium: Vicarage Road; Attendance: 19,774; Referee: Lewis Smith
Note: Fixture was initially scheduled for a 15:00 kick-off, but was moved for live Sky Sports broadcasting.

8 February 2025 31	Sunderland	2–2	Watford	Sunderland
12:30 GMT	O'Nien 16'; Cirkin (yellow card) 32' (goal) 89'; Isidor (yellow card) 35'; Le Fée (yellow card) 64'; Mepham (yellow card) 80'; Poveda (yellow card) 90+6'	Report	Doumbia (yellow card) 31'; Dele-Bashiru 43' (pen.); Louza 46'	Stadium: Stadium of Light; Attendance: 41,329; Referee: Robert Jones
Note: Fixture was initially scheduled for a 15:00 kick-off, but was moved for live Sky Sports broadcasting.

11 February 2025 32	Watford	0–4	Leeds United	Watford
19:45 GMT		Report	James 20', 28'; Solomon 35'; Piroe 62'	Stadium: Vicarage Road; Attendance: 19,582; Referee: Oliver Langford

15 February 2025 33	Middlesbrough	0–1	Watford	Middlesbrough
15:00 GMT	Ayling (yellow card) 47'; Forss (yellow card) 83'	Report	Sissoko 40'; Chakvetadze (yellow card) 65'; Selvik (yellow card) 81'	Stadium: Riverside Stadium; Attendance: 24,326; Referee: Adam Herczeg

23 February 2025 34	Watford	2–0	Luton Town	Watford
12:00 GMT	Ngakia (yellow card) 5'; Dele-Bashiru 11' (pen.); Kayembe 23'; Pollock (yellow card) 58'	Report	Andersen (yellow card) 42'; Morris (yellow card) 73'	Stadium: Vicarage Road; Attendance: 20,252; Referee: Andrew Kitchen
Note: Fixture was initially scheduled for 22 February, but was moved on local police request.

1 March 2025 35	Stoke City	0–0	Watford	Stoke-on-Trent
15:00 GMT	Pearson (yellow card) 33'	Report	Louza (yellow card) 33'; Chakvetadze (yellow card) 69'	Stadium: Bet365 Stadium; Attendance: 21,894; Referee: Tom Nield

8 March 2025 36	Watford	1–2	Millwall	Watford
12:30 GMT	Pollock 30'	Report	Cundle (yellow card) 50'; De Norre 59'; Coburn 81'	Stadium: Vicarage Road; Attendance: 20,031; Referee: Gavin Ward
Note: Fixture was initially scheduled for a 15:00 kick-off, but was moved for live Sky Sports broadcasting.

12 March 2025 37	Watford	1–0	Swansea City	Watford
19:45 GMT	Sissoko 27'; Louza (yellow card) 42'; Selvik (yellow card) 72'; Kayembe (yellow card) 88'	Report	Cabango (yellow card) 48'; Cullen (yellow card) 88'	Stadium: Vicarage Road; Attendance: 16,739; Referee: Jeremy Simpson

15 March 2025 38	Oxford United	1–0	Watford	Oxford
15:00 GMT	Płacheta (yellow card) 67'; Dembélé 82'	Report	Sierralta (yellow card) 51'; Abankwah (yellow card) 67' (yellow-red card) 79'	Stadium: Kassam Stadium; Attendance: 11,535; Referee: Bobby Madley

29 March 2025 39	Watford	0–0	Plymouth Argyle	Watford
12:30 GMT	Larouci (yellow card) 90+7'	Report	Gyabi (yellow card) 8'; Pleguezuelo (yellow card) 64'; Hazard (yellow card) 82'	Stadium: Vicarage Road; Attendance: 19,545; Referee: Ruebyn Ricardo
Note: Fixture was initially scheduled for a 15:00 kick-off, but was moved for live Sky Sports broadcasting.

5 April 2025 40	Bristol City	2–1	Watford	Bristol
15:00 BST	McCrorie 24'; Wells 29'; Earthy (yellow card) 69'	Report	Doumbia 80'	Stadium: Ashton Gate; Attendance: 22,505; Referee: Darren Bond

8 April 2025 41	Watford	1–0	Hull City	Watford
19:45 BST	Sissoko (yellow card) 39', (goal) 55'; Kayembe (yellow card) 67'; Ince (yellow card) 90+1'	Report		Stadium: Vicarage Road; Attendance: 17,268; Referee: James Bell

12 April 2025 42	West Bromwich Albion	2–1	Watford	West Bromwich
15:00 BST	Grant 11'; Lankshear (yellow card) 41'; Furlong (yellow card) 45+1'; Johnston 60'; Price (yellow card) 65'; Bartley (yellow card) 78'	Report	Pollock (yellow card) 41'; Louza (yellow card) 59'; Sissoko 76'	Stadium: The Hawthorns; Attendance: 24,768; Referee: Bobby Madley

18 April 2025 43	Watford	1–2	Burnley	Watford
15:00 BST	Doumbia 8'; Sissoko (yellow card) 59' (yellow-red card) 60'; Kayembe (yellow card) 66' (yellow-red card) 69'; Louza (yellow card) 69'; Bayo (yellow card) 84'; Andrews (yellow card) 90+7'	Report	Flemming 43', (yellow card) 61'; Brownhill 58'; Cullen (yellow card) 66'; Sarmiento (yellow card) 90+7'; Trafford (yellow card) 90+8'	Stadium: Vicarage Road; Attendance: 20,523; Referee: Matthew Donohue

21 April 2025 44	Portsmouth	1–0	Watford	Portsmouth
15:00 BST	Bishop 25', (yellow card) 27'; Aouchiche (yellow card) 44'; Potts (yellow card) 64'; Lang (yellow card) 90+5'	Report	Dwomoh (yellow card) 53'; Keben (red card) 57'; Louza (yellow card) 67'	Stadium: Fratton Park; Attendance: 20,451; Referee: Sam Allison

26 April 2025 45	Blackburn Rovers	2–1	Watford	Blackburn
15:00 BST	Hedges (yellow card) 34'; Dolan (yellow card) 44', (goal) 74'; Cantwell 59'; Dennis (yellow card) 90+2'; Travis (yellow card) 90+5'; Forshaw (yellow card) 90+7'	Report	Louza (yellow card) 16'; Abankwah (yellow card) 24'; Morris (yellow card) 46'; Pollock 47'; Doumbia (yellow card) 65'; Kayembe (yellow card) 85'	Stadium: Ewood Park; Attendance: 15,154; Referee: Elliot Bell

3 May 2025 46	Watford	1–1	Sheffield Wednesday	Watford
12:30 BST	Sissoko 45+1'	Report	Windass 29'; Valery (yellow card) 65'	Stadium: Vicarage Road; Attendance: 20,657; Referee: Stephen Martin
Note: Fixture was initially scheduled for a 15:00 kick-off, but all EFL Championship final matchday fixtures were moved to an earlier kick-off.

=== FA Cup ===
Watford joined the FA Cup at the third round stage, and were drawn away against Fulham.

Win Draw Loss Fixtures

9 January 2025 Third round	Fulham	4–1	Watford	Fulham
19:45 GMT	Muniz 26'; Cuenca (yellow card) 38'; Jiménez 49' (pen.); Andersen 65'; Castagne 85'	Report	Kayembe (yellow card) 8'; Vata 33'	Stadium: Craven Cottage; Referee: Matt Donohue

=== EFL Cup ===
On 27 June, the draw for the first round was made, with Watford being drawn at home against Milton Keynes Dons. In the second round, they were drawn at home to Plymouth Argyle. On 28 August, Watford drew against the prior season's Premier League champions Manchester City in an away clash at the Etihad Stadium.

Win Draw Loss Fixtures

13 August 2024 First round	Watford	5–0	Milton Keynes Dons	Watford
19:45 BST	Pollock 24'; Ince 45+1', 67', 74'; Baah 64'; Sierralta (yellow card) 70'	Report	Williams (yellow card) 90'	Stadium: Vicarage Road; Attendance: 6,885; Referee: Lewis Smith

27 August 2024 Second round	Watford	2–0	Plymouth Argyle	Watford
19:45 BST	Rajović 17', 72'; Morris (yellow card) 41'; Dele-Bashiru (yellow card) 45'; Tikvić (yellow card) 84'	Report	Houghton (yellow card) 45+1'	Stadium: Vicarage Road; Attendance: 8,319; Referee: Andy Davies

24 September 2024 Third round	Manchester City	2–1	Watford	Manchester
19:45 BST	Doku 5'; Nunes 38'	Report	Ince 86'	Stadium: Etihad Stadium; Attendance: 40,584; Referee: David Webb

== Statistics ==
=== Appearances and goals ===
Players with no appearances are not included on the list
Italics indicate a loaned in player

No.	Pos.	Nat.	Name	League		FA Cup		EFL Cup		Total		Discipline	
No.	Pos.	Nat.	Name	Apps	Goals	Apps	Goals	Apps	Goals	Apps	Goals	A yellow rectangle, denoting the yellow penalty card shown to a player being cautioned	A red rectangle, denoting the red penalty card shown to a player being sent off
1	GK	AUT	Daniel Bachmann	22	0	0	0	0	0	22	0	1	0
2	DF	ENG	Jeremy Ngakia	23+6	1	0	0	0	0	23+6	1	4	0
3	DF	CHI	Francisco Sierralta	21+12	0	0	0	2	0	23+12	0	9	0
4	FW	CMR	Kévin Keben	3+3	0	0	0	0	0	3+3	0	0	1
5	DF	SCO	Ryan Porteous	18+4	2	1	0	2	0	21+4	2	6	0
6	DF	ENG	Mattie Pollock	42+3	2	0	0	1+2	1	43+3	3	6	0
7	FW	ENG	Tom Ince	13+19	1	1	0	3	4	17+19	5	1	0
8	MF	GEO	Giorgi Chakvetadze	37+2	2	0+1	0	0+1	0	37+4	2	6	0
9	FW	DEN	Mileta Rajović	0+3	1	0	0	2	2	2+3	3	1	0
10	MF	MAR	Imran Louza	30+3	2	0+1	0	3	0	33+4	2	11	0
11	MF	IRE	Rocco Vata	15+18	3	1	1	1+2	0	17+20	4	0	0
12	FW	SWE	Ken Sema	4+10	0	0	0	3	0	7+10	0	0	0
14	MF	BEL	Pierre Dwomoh	6+3	0	1	0	0+1	0	7+4	0	1	0
15	DF	CRO	Antonio Tikvić	0	0	1	0	0+2	0	1+2	0	1	0
17	MF	FRA	Moussa Sissoko	33+7	6	0	0	0	0	33+7	6	4	1
19	FW	CIV	Vakoun Issouf Bayo	22+16	10	0	0	1	0	23+16	10	3	1
20	FW	MLI	Mamadou Doumbia	12+7	2	1	0	0+2	0	13+9	2	2	0
21	DF	ITA	Angelo Ogbonna	5+1	0	1	0	1	0	7+1	0	0	0
22	DF	ENG	James Morris	13+5	0	0	0	3	0	16+5	0	4	0
24	MF	NGA	Tom Dele-Bashiru	25+2	4	0	0	2+1	0	27+3	4	1	0
25	DF	IRL	James Abankwah	17+2	0	0	0	0	0	17+2	0	3	1
26	DF	USA	Caleb Wiley	8+2	0	0	0	0	0	8+2	0	0	0
33	GK	NOR	Egil Selvik	16	0	0	0	0	0	16	0	2	0
34	FW	GER	Kwadwo Baah	16+11	4	0+1	0	2+1	1	17+13	5	5	1
37	DF	ALG	Yasser Larouci	26+13	0	1	0	1+1	0	28+14	0	3	0
39	MF	COD	Edo Kayembe	37+7	8	1	0	0+1	0	38+8	8	9	1
45	DF	ENG	Ryan Andrews	21+17	3	1	0	2	0	24+17	3	3	0
47	FW	ENG	Zavier Massiah-Edwards	0+4	0	0	0	0	0	0+4	0	0	0
49	FW	ENG	Michael Adu-Poku	0+1	0	0	0	0	0	0+1	0	0	0
52	MF	ENG	Leo Ramirez-Espain	0	0	0	0	0+2	0	0+2	0	0	0
53	FW	AFG	Amin Nabizada	0+1	0	0+1	0	0	0	0+2	0	0	0
Players who featured whilst on loan but returned to parent club on loan during the season:
18	FW	CAN	Daniel Jebbison	3+10	0	0	0	0	0	3+10	0	2	0
36	DF	IRL	Festy Ebosele	7+11	1	0	0	1+0	0	8+11	1	5	0
Players who featured but departed the club permanently during the season:
23	GK	ENG	Jonathan Bond	8+1	0	1	0	3	0	12+1	0	0	0
