= Jeremy Ngakia =

English footballer (born 2000)

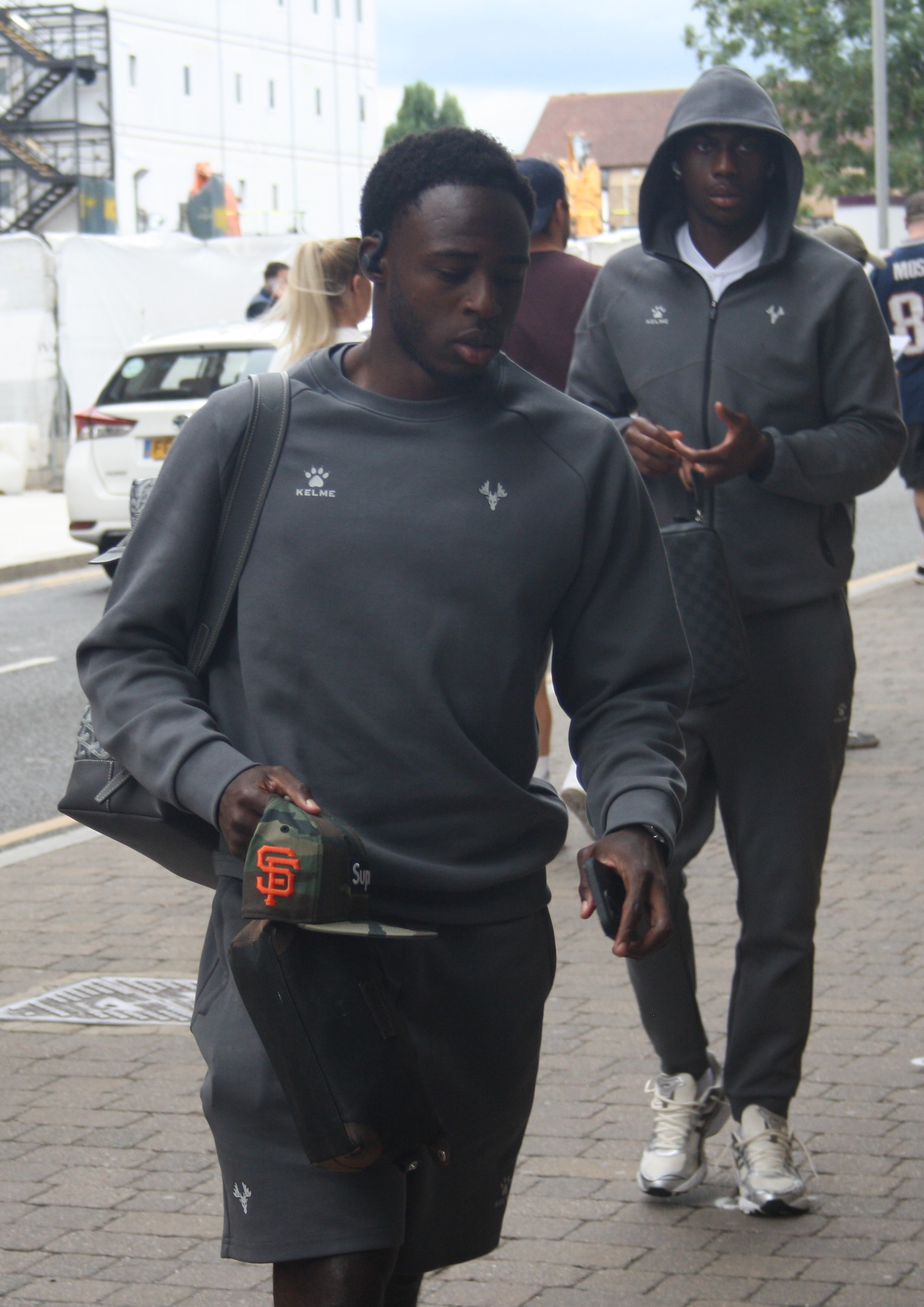
- Ngakia with Watford in 2025

Personal information
- Full name: Jeremy Mpobi Ngakia
- Date of birth: 7 September 2000 (age 26)
- Place of birth: Deptford, England
- Height: 6 ft 0 in (1.84 m)
- Position: Right back

Team information
- Current team: Watford
- Number: 2

Youth career
- Ballers Academy
- 2014–2019: West Ham United

Senior career*
Years	Team	Apps	(Gls)
2019–2020	West Ham United	5	(0)
2020–	Watford	128	(4)
- * Club domestic league appearances and goals as of 00:44, 28 February 2026 (UTC)

Jeremy Mpobi Ngakia (born 7 September 2000) is an English professional footballer who plays as a right-back for EFL Championship club Watford.

== Club career ==
=== Youth career ===
Born in Deptford, south east London, Ngakia had a trial with Chelsea's academy before joining West Ham United at the age of 14 after being scouted by West Ham academy goalkeeping coach Jerome John after being recommended by Surrey Quays-based youth club Ballers Football Academy. Ngakia made his under-18 debut for West Ham during the 2016–17 season and later made his under-23 debut in February 2018.

=== West Ham United ===
On 29 January 2020, Ngakia made his debut for West Ham in a 2–0 Premier League loss against Liverpool.

In June 2020, with his contract due to finish at the end of the month, Ngakia turned down the offer of an extension leaving him available on a free transfer when his current contract ended. West Ham later confirmed his departure at the end of June 2020. Ngakia's last appearance for West Ham was the 2–0 Premier League defeat against Wolverhampton Wanderers on 20 June 2020 with West Ham still having seven games remaining in their 2019–20 campaign.

=== Watford ===
Ngakia signed for Championship side Watford on 14 August 2020 on a four-year contract. He made his debut on the opening day of the 2020–21 season, 11 September 2020, in a 1–0 home win against Middlesbrough. On 23 May 2024, the club announced he had signed a three-year extension.

== International career ==
Ngakia was born and raised in England, but is also of Congolese descent, making him eligible to represent both England and the DR Congo at international level.

== Career statistics ==
As of match played 27 February 2026

Appearances and goals by club, season and competition
Club	Season	League			FA Cup		League Cup		Other		Total	
Club	Season	Division	Apps	Goals	Apps	Goals	Apps	Goals	Apps	Goals	Apps	Goals
West Ham United	2019–20	Premier League	5	0	0	0	0	0	—		5	0
Watford	2020–21	Championship	25	0	1	0	0	0	—		26	0
Watford	2021–22	Premier League	16	0	1	0	2	0	—		19	0
Watford	2022–23	Championship	14	0	0	0	0	0	—		14	0
Watford	2023–24	Championship	14	0	0	0	1	0	—		15	0
Watford	2024–25	Championship	29	1	0	0	0	0	—		29	1
Watford	2025–26	Championship	30	3	0	0	1	0	—		31	3
Watford	Total		128	4	2	0	4	0	—		134	4
Career total			133	4	2	0	4	0	—		139	4
