= Giorgi Chakvetadze =

Georgian footballer (born 1999)

Personal information
- Date of birth: 29 August 1999 (age 27)
- Place of birth: Tbilisi, Georgia
- Height: 1.83 m (6 ft 0 in)
- Positions: Attacking midfielder; left winger; central midfielder

Team information
- Current team: Udinese
- Number: 30

Youth career
- 2007–2010: Norchi Dinamoeli
- 2010–2016: Dinamo Tbilisi

Senior career*
Years	Team	Apps	(Gls)
2016–2017	Dinamo Tbilisi	29	(5)
2017–2024	Gent	50	(5)
2022	→ Hamburger SV (loan)	10	(1)
2022–2023	→ Slovan Bratislava (loan)	25	(1)
2023–2024	→ Watford (loan)	23	(1)
2024–2026	Watford	79	(2)
2026–	Udinese	7	(0)

International career^{‡}
2015–2016	Georgia U17	20	(5)
2016	Georgia U18	5	(0)
2016–2017	Georgia U19	14	(1)
2017	Georgia U21	3	(0)
2018–	Georgia	45	(10)
- * Club domestic league appearances and goals as of 31 October 2026 ‡ National team caps and goals as of 18 November 2026

Giorgi Chakvetadze (Order of Honor) (Georgian: გიორგი ჩაკვეტაძე; born 29 August 1999) is a Georgian professional footballer who plays for Serie A club Udinese and the Georgia national team. Mainly an attacking midfielder, he can also be deployed as a left winger or as a central midfielder.

Chakvetadze has earned the Footballer of the Year award in Georgia. He has also won the Slovak First League with Slovan Bratislava.

== Club career ==
=== Early career and Dinamo Tbilisi ===
Born in Tbilisi, Chakvetadze started his career with Norchi Dinamo. His first manager was former footballer Tamaz Kostava, who described Chakvetadze as a hardworking player.

In 2010, after some successful seasons in the youth championships of Georgia, Chakvetadze moved to Dinamo Tbilisi, where he won U15 and U17 championships. In 2015, Chakvetadze signed a three-year deal with Dinamo.

Chakvetadze was promoted to the first team in 2016, making his debut against Locomotive Tbilisi on 18 November 2016, replacing Otar Kiteishvili. That season the young midfielder made 5 appearances for Dinamo. In the following season, Chakvetadze became a key figure of the club, scoring five goals in 24 appearances with the club, with two of them against Dila Gori.

=== Gent ===
At the end of summer 2017, Chakvetadze signed with Gent. The president of the Georgian club, Roman Pipia confirmed that the Belgian club was not the only one interested in signing the young player, declaring that Liverpool, Tottenham Hotspur, Hoffenheim and Bayer Leverkusen tried to sign him as well.

Following the 2017 season, the Georgian Football Federation named Giorgi Chakvetadze the best young player of the year after his prolific performance both at the club and U19 Euro Championship.

In April 2018, he topped the list of seven young distinguished players based on votes from Belgian football fans.

Early next year Chakvetadze was included by UEFA in the list of 50 perspective players of 2019 among U21 players. Also, he was named in the symbolic team of Belgium's top division following the first half of the 2018–19 season.

Around the same time, Giorgi Chakvetadze received the Best Player of the Year award in Georgia, especially given his several impressive games in the 2018–19 UEFA Nations League campaign.

In December 2018, Chakvetadze suffered a knee injury, which later required a surgery. It saw him out of action for a long time.

His surname is transliterated as Tsjakvetadze in Dutch.

==== Loan to Hamburger SV ====
On 27 January 2022, Chakvetadze joined Hamburger SV on loan. He participated in ten matches with this 2.Bundesliga club, scoring once.

==== Loan to Slovan Bratislava ====
On 4 July 2022, Slovan Bratislava signed Giorgi Chakvetadze on a one-year loan. He debuted with his new club as a second-half substitute on 6 July during the UEFA Champions League 1st qualifying round game against Dinamo Batumi.

During this season Chakvetadze took part in 47 matches in all competitions and became a champion with Slovan. He played in eight UEFA Conference League games, providing four assists.

Before the start of the next season, Slovan intended to purchase him, but the sides failed to reach an agreement on his transfer fee.

=== Watford ===
In July 2023, Chakvetadze joined English club Watford on a season-long loan. He scored his first EFL Championship goal on Boxing day against Bristol City. On 1 February 2024, Watford confirmed that they had completed the permanent signing of Chakvetadze with the contract extended to another five-year period later in September that year.

Having played 37 games in all competitions during his first year, Chakvetadze had a memorable start to the 2024–25 season. As the club secured two wins from two Championship games, he not only scored and assisted, but also made it into the team of the week. Later, when some of the media outlets summed up the first half of this season, Chakvetadze was selected as best player of the team. According to some estimates made in December 2024, Chakvetadze had a 150% increase in his wages compared to his loan period, which made him the Hornets' fifth-highest earner.

=== Udinese ===
On 6 July 2026, Chakvetadze signed a four-year contract with Udinese in Italy.

== International career ==
Chakvetadze scored his debut goal of his senior career in a friendly match against Lithuania on 24 March 2018 in Tbilisi, where Georgia achieved a 4–0 win over its guests.

On 6 September 2018, Chakvetadze opened the scoring in a 2–0 win over Kazakhstan, the first goal in the history of the UEFA Nations League. On 19 November 2018, he assisted and scored again for Georgia in his country's 2–1 win over Kazakhstan which confirmed the country as the winner of its group.

On 25 March 2023, Chakvetadze bagged a brace in a 6–1 win over Mongolia.

A year later he took part in both UEFA Euro 2024 qualifying matches and made a vital contribution to Georgia's first major international achievement. He participated in all four games that the national team held in the tournament. On 2 July 2024, Chakvetadze was awarded the Order of Honour along with his teammates.

== Career statistics ==
=== Club ===
As of match played 2 May 2026

Appearances and goals by club, season and competition
Club	Season	League			National cup (Note: Includes Georgian Cup, Belgian Cup, DFB-Pokal, Slovak Cup, FA Cup, Coppa Italia)		Continental		Other		Total	
Club	Season	Division	Apps	Goals	Apps	Goals	Apps	Goals	Apps	Goals	Apps	Goals
Dinamo Tbilisi	2016	Erovnuli Liga	5	0	—		—		—		5	0
Dinamo Tbilisi	2017	Erovnuli Liga	24	5	2	0	—		—		26	5
Dinamo Tbilisi	Total		29	5	2	0	0	0	0	0	31	5
Gent	2017–18	Belgian First Division A	10	1	—		—		9 (Note: Appearances in Belgian Pro League play-offs)	0	19	1
Gent	2018–19	Belgian First Division A	20	4	4	1	4 (Note: Appearances in UEFA Europa League)	0	3	1	31	6
Gent	2019–20	Belgian First Division A	9	0	0	0	3	0	0	0	12	1
Gent	2020–21	Belgian First Division A	3	0	0	0	1 (Note: Appearance in UEFA Champions League)	0	0	0	4	0
Gent	2021–22	Belgian First Division A	8	0	1	1	6 (Note: Appearances in UEFA Conference League)	0	—		15	1
Gent	Total		50	5	5	2	8	0	12	1	81	8
Hamburger SV (loan)	2021–22	2. Bundesliga	10	1	2	0	—		—		12	1
Slovan Bratislava (loan)	2022–23	Super Liga	25	1	6	0	16 (Note: Four appearances in UEFA Champions League, two appearances in UEFA Europa League, ten appearances in UEFA Conference League)	0	—		47	1
Watford (loan)	2023–24	EFL Championship	23	1	0	0	—		—		23	1
Watford	2023–24	EFL Championship	11	0	3	0	—		—		14	0
Watford	2024–25	EFL Championship	39	2	1	0	—		1 (Note: Appearance in EFL Cup)	0	41	2
Watford	2025–26	EFL Championship	29	0	0	0	—		0	0	29	0
Watford	Total		79	2	4	0	0	0	1	0	84	2
Udinese	2026–27	Serie A	0	0	0	0	—		—		0	0
Career total			215	15	19	2	30	0	13	1	277	18

=== International ===
As of matches played on 17 November 2026

Appearances and goals by national team and year
National team	Year	Apps	Goals
Georgia	2018	7	5
Georgia	2019	0	0
Georgia	2020	2	0
Georgia	2021	4	0
Georgia	2022	1	0
Georgia	2023	8	3
Georgia	2024	13	1
Georgia	2025	2	1
2026	8	0	
Total		45	10

Scores and results list Georgia's goal tally first, score column indicates score after each Chakvetadze goal.

List of international goals scored by Giorgi Chakvetadze
No.	Date	Venue	Opponent	Cap	Score	Result	Competition
1	24 March 2018	Mikheil Meskhi Stadium, Tbilisi, Georgia	Lithuania	1	4–0	4–0	Friendly
2	6 September 2018	Astana Arena, Astana, Kazakhstan	Kazakhstan	2	1–0	2–0	2018–19 UEFA Nations League D
3	16 October 2018	Daugava Stadium, Riga, Latvia	Latvia	5	3–0	3–0	2018–19 UEFA Nations League D
4	15 November 2018	Estadi Nacional, Andorra la Vella, Andorra	Andorra	6	1–0	1–1	2018–19 UEFA Nations League D
5	19 November 2018	Boris Paichadze Dinamo Arena, Tbilisi, Georgia	Kazakhstan	7	2–0	2–1	2018–19 UEFA Nations League D
6	25 March 2023	Batumi Arena, Batumi, Georgia	Mongolia	15	2–1	6–1	Friendly
7	25 March 2023	Batumi Arena, Batumi, Georgia	Mongolia	15	3–1	6–1	Friendly
8	8 September 2023	Boris Paichadze Dinamo Arena, Tbilisi, Georgia	Spain	17	1–4	1–7	UEFA Euro 2024 qualifying
9	7 September 2024	Mikheil Meskhi Stadium, Tbilisi, Georgia	Czech Republic	30	2–0	4–1	2024–25 UEFA Nations League
10	23 March 2025	Boris Paichadze Dinamo Arena, Tbilisi, Georgia	Armenia	37	3–0	6–1	2024–25 UEFA Nations League promotion/relegation play-off

== Honours ==
Individual

- Player of the Year in Georgia: 2018
- Order of Honour

Team

- Slovak First League Winner: 2022–23
- Belgian Cup Winner: 2022; Runner-Up 2019
