= Michael Adu-Poku =

English footballer (born 2005)

Personal information
- Full name: Michael Kofi Adu-Poku
- Date of birth: 22 September 2005 (age 21)
- Place of birth: Hackney, England
- Position: Winger

Team information
- Current team: Newport County (on loan from Watford)
- Number: 23

Youth career
- 2018–: Watford

Senior career*
Years	Team	Apps	(Gls)
2023–	Watford	3	(0)
2024	→ Kings Langley (loan)	4	(2)
2024	→ Maidstone United (loan)	6	(0)
2024	→ Solihull Moors (loan)	11	(1)
2025	→ Rochdale (loan)	7	(0)
2025–2026	→ Barrow (loan)	4	(0)
2026	→ Wealdstone (loan)	13	(0)
2026–	→ Newport County (loan)	11	(0)
- * Club domestic league appearances and goals as of 20:30, 14 November 2026 (UTC)

Michael Kofi Adu-Poku (born 22 September 2005) is an English professional footballer who plays as a winger for EFL League Two club Newport County on loan from EFL Championship club Watford.

== Career ==
Adu-Poku joined Watford in 2018 having had a successful trial for the Watford Under-13s team. Adu-Poku made his senior debut on 7 January, 2023 in the FA Cup against Reading. He reflected that he couldn't dominate physically in senior football as he does routinely in youth football and that it was a step up for him. Two weeks later, On 21 January, 2023 he made his league debut appearing as a second-half substitute at home against Rotherham United. He joined Kings Langley on a month-long loan in February 2024, then signed on loan with Maidstone United for the remainder of the season the following month.

Adu-Poku spent the first half of the 2024–25 season on loan at Solihull Moors, before joining fellow National League side Rochdale on loan in March 2025.

On June 27 2025, Adu-Poku was signed by Barrow on a season-long loan, however he returned to Watford on 16 January 2026. Five days later, he joined Wealdstone on a short-term loan deal. On 1 September 2026 Adu-Poku joined EFL League Two club Newport County on loan for the remainder of the 2026–27 season. He made his Newport debut on 5 September 2026 in the 1-0 League Two defeat to Northampton Town. Adu-Poku scored his first goal for Newport in the 3-1 FA Cup first round win against Walsall on 7 November 2026.

== Personal life ==
Born in England, Adu-Poku is of Ghanaian descent.

== Career statistics ==
=== Club ===
As of match played 14 November 2026

Appearances and goals by club, season and competition
Club	Season	League			FA Cup		EFL Cup		Other		Total	
Club	Season	Division	Apps	Goals	Apps	Goals	Apps	Goals	Apps	Goals	Apps	Goals
Watford	2022–23	Championship	1	0	1	0	0	0	0	0	2	0
Watford	2023–24	Championship	0	0	0	0	0	0	0	0	0	0
Watford	2024–25	Championship	1	0	0	0	0	0	0	0	1	0
Watford	2025–26	Championship	0	0	0	0	0	0	0	0	0	0
Watford	2026–27	Championship	1	0	0	0	1	0	0	0	2	0
Watford	Total		3	0	1	0	0	0	0	0	5	0
Kings Langley (loan)	2023–24	Southern League Division One Central	4	2	0	0	—		0	0	4	2
Maidstone United (loan)	2023–24	National League South	6	0	0	0	—		0	0	6	0
Solihull Moors (loan)	2024–25	National League	11	1	2	0	—		1	0	14	1
Rochdale (loan)	2024–25	National League	7	0	0	0	—		0	0	7	0
Barrow (loan)	2025–26	League Two	4	0	2	0	0	0	2 (Note: Appearances in EFL Trophy)	0	8	0
Wealdstone (loan)	2025–26	National League	13	0	0	0	—		3 (Note: Appearance(s) in FA Trophy)	0	16	0
Newport County (loan)	2026–27	League Two	11	0	1	1	—		2	0	14	1
Career total			59	3	6	1	0	0	8	0	74	4

== Honours ==
Wealdstone

- FA Trophy runner-up: 2025–26
