= Pierre Dwomoh =

Belgian footballer (born 2004)

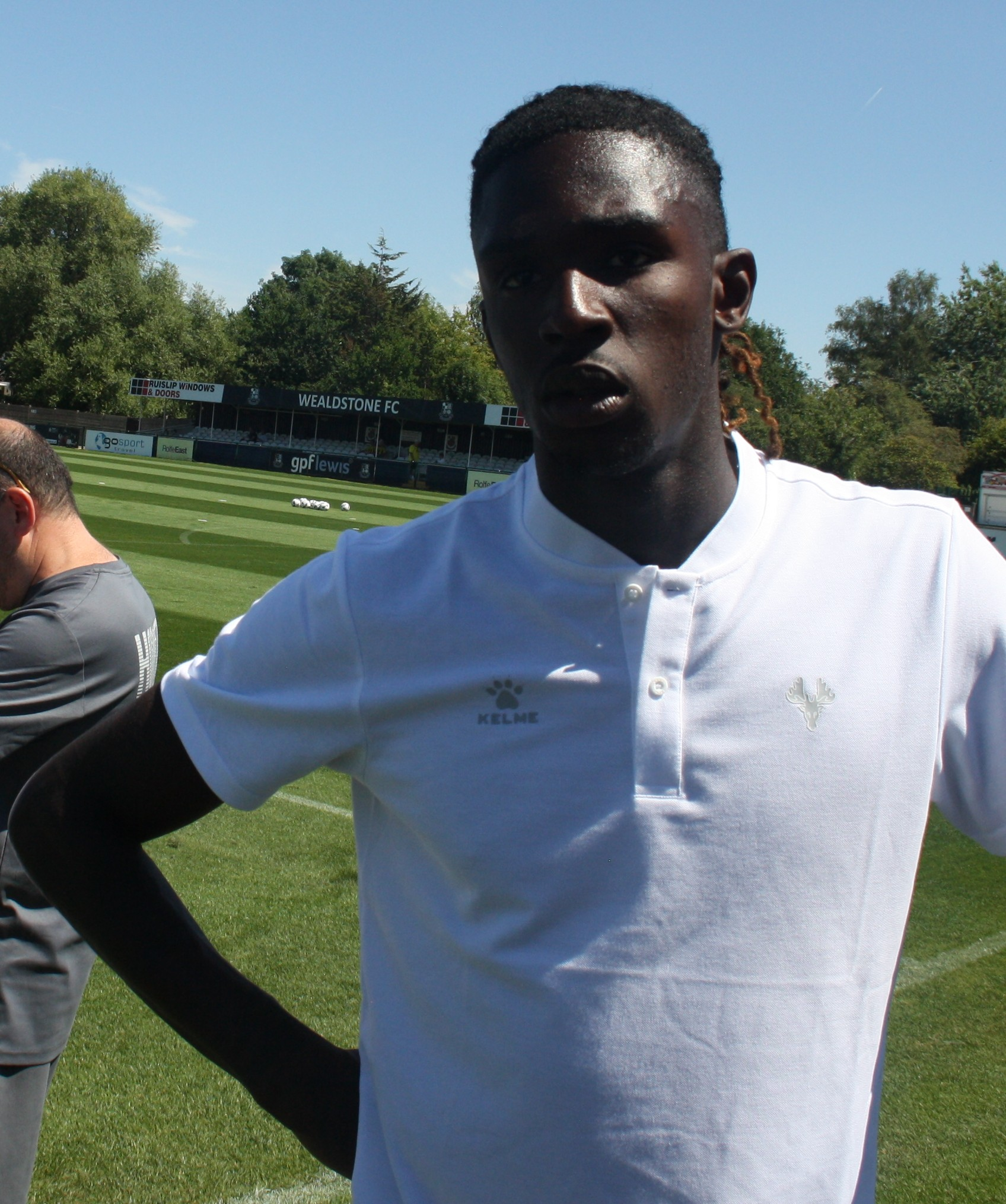
- Pierre Dwomoh in 2025.

Personal information
- Full name: Pierre Junior Dwomoh
- Date of birth: 21 June 2004 (age 22)
- Place of birth: Ghent, Belgium
- Height: 1.85 m (6 ft 1 in)
- Position: Midfielder

Team information
- Current team: Lierse
- Number: 79

Youth career
- 2009–2011: SK Heffen
- 2011–2014: Mechelen
- 2014–2016: Anderlecht
- 2016–2020: Genk

Senior career*
Years	Team	Apps	(Gls)
2020–2021	Genk	2	(0)
2021–2024	Antwerp	9	(0)
2022	→ Braga (loan)	0	(0)
2022	→ Braga B (loan)	3	(0)
2023	→ Oostende (loan)	8	(0)
2023–2024	→ RWD Molenbeek (loan)	30	(1)
2024–2026	Watford	10	(0)
2026–	Lierse	2	(0)

International career^{‡}
2019	Belgium U15	3	(0)
2019–2020	Belgium U17	9	(1)
2021	Belgium U18	2	(0)
2023	Belgium U20	2	(0)
2024	Belgium U21	1	(1)
- * Club domestic league appearances and goals as of 11 September 2026 ‡ National team caps and goals as of 4 June 2024

Pierre Junior Dwomoh (born 21 June 2004) is a Belgian footballer who plays as a midfielder for Challenger Pro League club Lierse.

== Club career ==
Dwomoh made his professional debut with Genk in a 2-0 Belgian First Division A win over Kortrijk.

On 27 August 2021, he signed a five-year contract with Antwerp.

On 2 September 2022, Dwomoh joined Portuguese club Braga on loan for the 2022–23 season however was recalled in December 2022 having failed to make an appearance. On 2 January 2023, he signed a new contract with Antwerp and joined Oostende on loan until the end of the season with an option to buy.

On 29 June 2023, Dwomoh joined RWD Molenbeek on loan with an option to buy.

On 26 August 2024, Dwomoh permanently signed for EFL Championship club Watford FC on a long-term deal. He was released by the club in June 2026, after he received an 11-match ban from the FA for racially abusing a Watford U21 teammate.

On 28 August 2026, Dwomoh joined Challenger Pro League side Lierse, signing a two-year contract.

== International career ==
Born in Belgium, Dwomoh is of Ghanaian descent. Dwomoh has played internationally for Belgium at under-15 and under-17 levels.

== Career statistics ==
As of 22 October 2025

Appearances and goals by club, season and competition
Club	Season	League			National cup (Note: Includes Belgian Cup, FA Cup)		League cup (Note: Includes EFL Cup)		Other		Total	
Club	Season	Division	Apps	Goals	Apps	Goals	Apps	Goals	Apps	Goals	Apps	Goals
Genk	2020–21	Belgian First Division A	2	0	0	0	—		—		2	0
Antwerp	2021–22	Belgian First Division A	9	0	1	0	—		4 (Note: Appearances in UEFA Europa League)	0	14	0
Braga B (loan)	2022–23	Liga 3	3	0	—		—		—		3	0
Oostende (loan)	2022–23	Belgian Pro League	8	0	0	0	—		—		8	0
RWD Molenbeek (loan)	2023–24	Belgian Pro League	30	1	3	0	—		—		33	1
Watford	2024–25	EFL Championship	9	0	1	0	1	0	—		11	0
Watford	2025–26	EFL Championship	1	0	0	0	0	0	—		1	0
Watford	Total		10	0	1	0	1	0	—		12	0
Career total			62	1	5	0	1	0	4	0	72	1
