= Ryan Andrews (footballer) =

English footballer

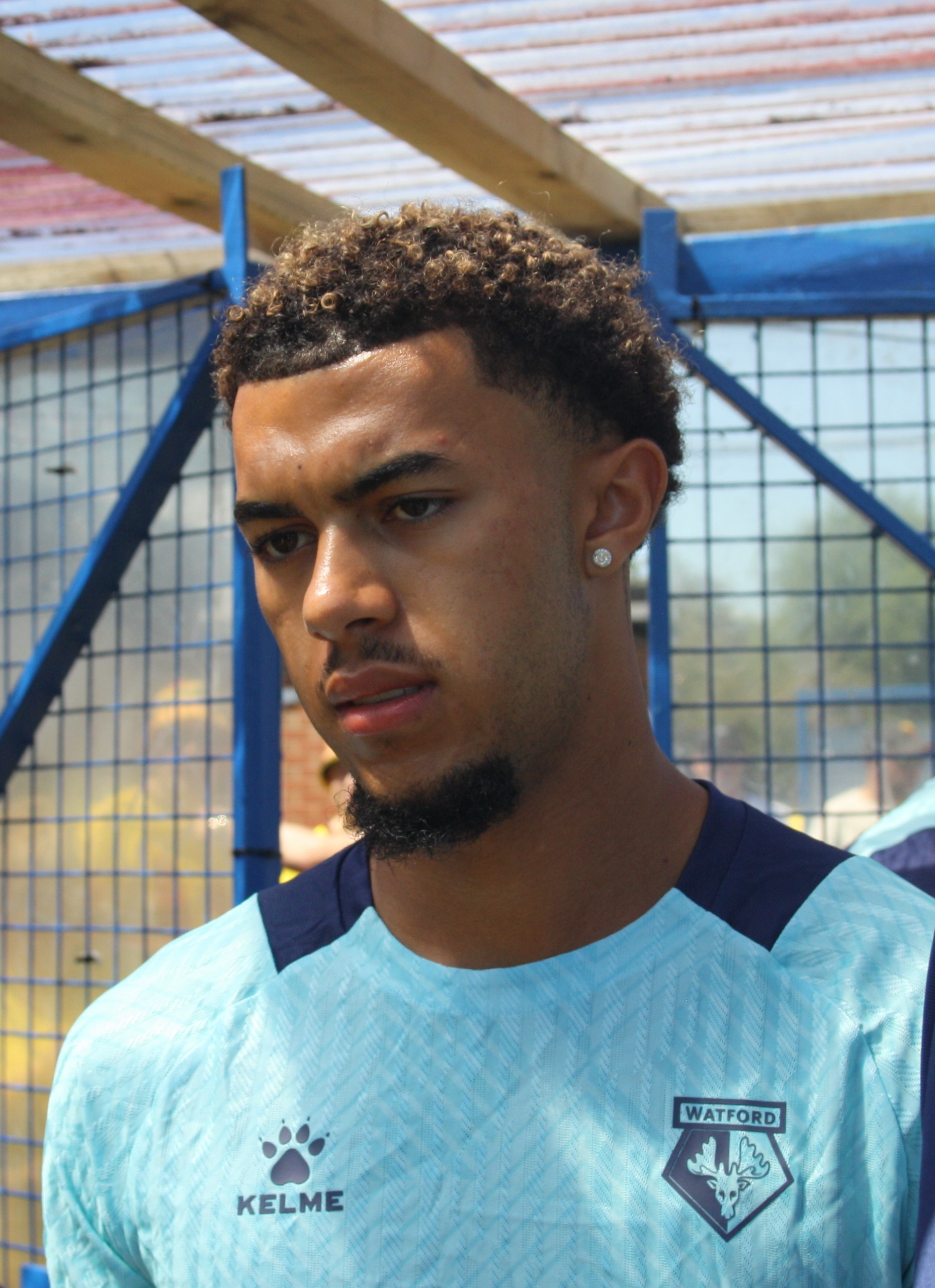
- Ryan Andrews in 2025.

Personal information
- Full name: Ryan Tyler Wayne Andrews
- Date of birth: 26 August 2004 (age 22)
- Place of birth: Watford, England
- Height: 1.70 m (5 ft 7 in)
- Position: Right-back

Team information
- Current team: Young Boys
- Number: 2

Youth career
- 2012–2023: Watford

Senior career*
Years	Team	Apps	(Gls)
2023–2025	Watford	87	(6)
2025–	Young Boys	12	(0)

International career^{‡}
2023–2024	England U20	6	(0)
- * Club domestic league appearances and goals as of 25 January 2026 (UTC) ‡ National team caps and goals as of 13:38, 12 December 2024 (UTC)

Ryan Tyler Wayne Andrews (born 26 August 2004) is an English professional footballer who plays as a right-back for Swiss Super League club Young Boys.

== Club career ==
=== Watford ===
Born in Watford, Andrews was with the Watford academy from 2012 onwards. He signed his first professional contract with Watford in May 2022, with the deal lasting two years with the option of a third.

He made his first senior appearance on 7 January 2023 in the FA Cup away against Reading He described his debut as "an absolute joy!...it's a dream come true for me, my family and everyone that's helped me in my career so far."

Andrews made his league debut in the EFL Championship playing at right-back against Coventry on 10 April 2023, with Watford manager Chris Wilder saying " "I thought he was great...he can be pleased he played a part in the real good things we did. His performance was another good thing that happened today." After playing the next week against Bristol City and starting consecutive games Andrews was named in the Championship team of the week. Chris Wilder again praised his performance saying he "didn't do a lot wrong for me, he had energy, he had power, he had pace, he was positive, he took the ball up the pitch, he picked out some good passes and he defended really well." He finished the season with six consecutive starts in the Championship at full-back ahead of recognised international players with Wilder saying he had the place on merit and was a "natural footballer".

=== Young Boys ===
On 31 August 2025, Andrews signed for Swiss Super League club Young Boys in a transfer worth around £2.6m, agreeing a four-year contract. Andrews made his European debut for Young Boys against Panathinaikos on 25 September 2025, in the group stage of the UEFA Europa League.

== International career ==
In October 2023, he was called up to the England U-20 side for matches against Portugal U-20 and Romania U-20. He made his debut on 12 October 2023 during a 2–0 away defeat to Romania.

== Personal life ==
He is the son of former Watford footballer Wayne Andrews. He is of Barbadian descent through his grandmother Dominican through his grandfather

== Career statistics ==
As of 25 January 2026

Appearances and goals by club, season and competition
Club	Season	League			National Cup		League Cup		Europe		Other		Total	
Club	Season	Division	Apps	Goals	Apps	Goals	Apps	Goals	Apps	Goals	Apps	Goals	Apps	Goals
Watford	2022–23	Championship	6	0	1	0	0	0	–		0	0	7	0
Watford	2023–24	Championship	40	3	3	0	1	0	–		0	0	44	3
Watford	2024–25	Championship	38	3	1	0	2	0	–		0	0	41	3
Watford	2025–26	Championship	3	0	0	0	1	0	–		0	0	4	0
Watford	Total		87	6	5	0	4	0	0	0	0	0	96	6
Young Boys	2025–26	Swiss Super League	12	0	1	0	–		5 (Note: Appearances in UEFA Europa League)	0	0	0	18	0
Career total			99	6	6	0	4	0	5	0	0	0	114	6
