= Rocco Vata =

Irish footballer (born 2005)

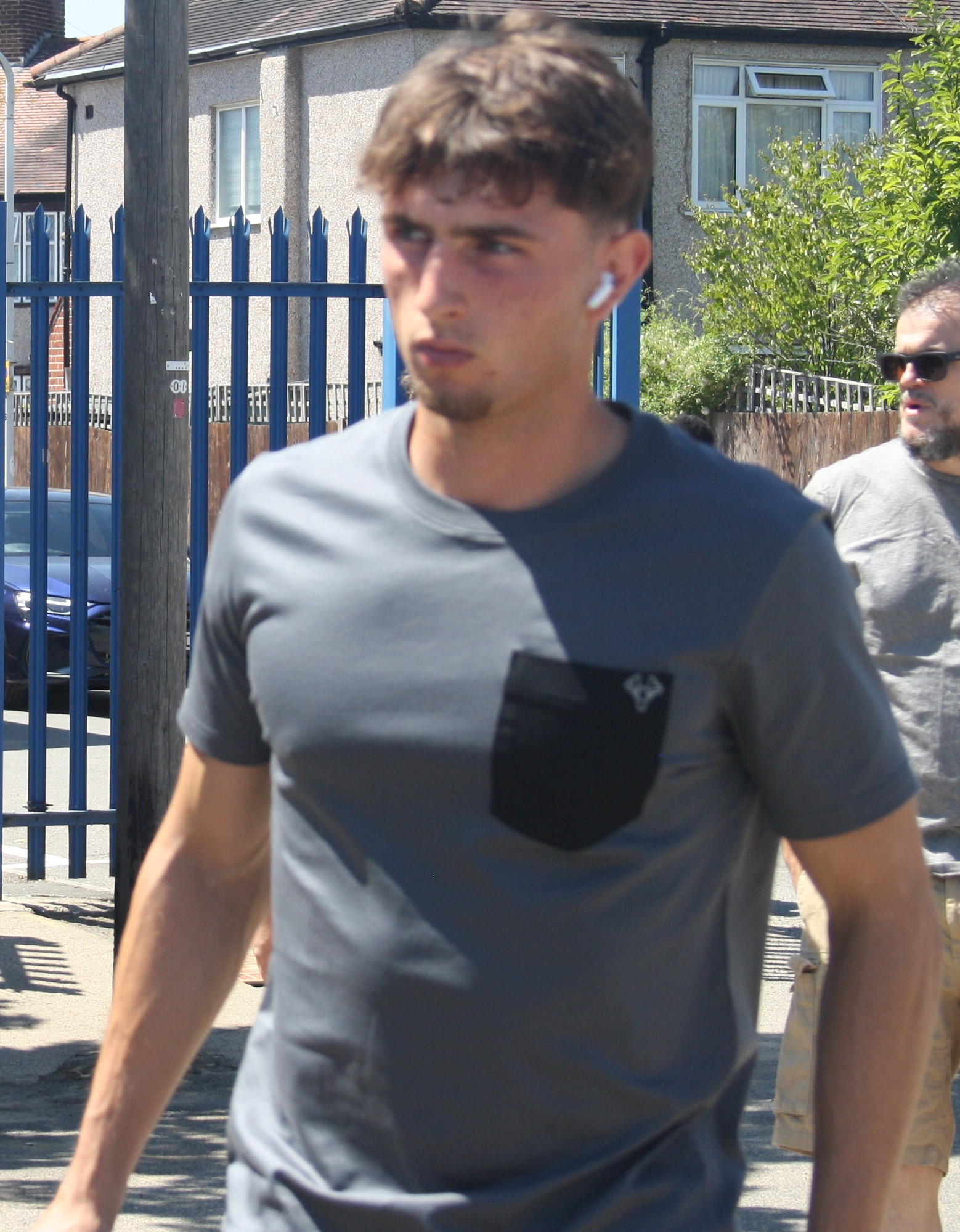
- Vata in 2025.

Personal information
- Date of birth: 18 April 2005 (age 21)
- Place of birth: Glasgow, Scotland
- Height: 1.75 m (5 ft 9 in)
- Position: Midfielder

Team information
- Current team: Watford
- Number: 11

Youth career
- 2012–2021: Celtic

Senior career*
Years	Team	Apps	(Gls)
2021–2024	Celtic B	55	(28)
2022–2024	Celtic	5	(0)
2024–	Watford	54	(5)

International career^{‡}
2019–2020	Republic of Ireland U15	3	(0)
2021–2022	Republic of Ireland U17	8	(3)
2021	Republic of Ireland U18	2	(0)
2022–2023	Republic of Ireland U19	8	(0)
2023–2025	Republic of Ireland U21	10	(6)
2025–	Republic of Ireland	4	(0)
- * Club domestic league appearances and goals as of 22 October 2026 (UTC) ‡ National team caps and goals as of 23:27, 17 November 2026 (UTC)

Rocco Vata (born 18 April 2005) is a professional footballer who plays as a midfielder for EFL Championship club Watford. Born in Scotland, he represents the Republic of Ireland national team.

== Club career ==
=== Celtic ===
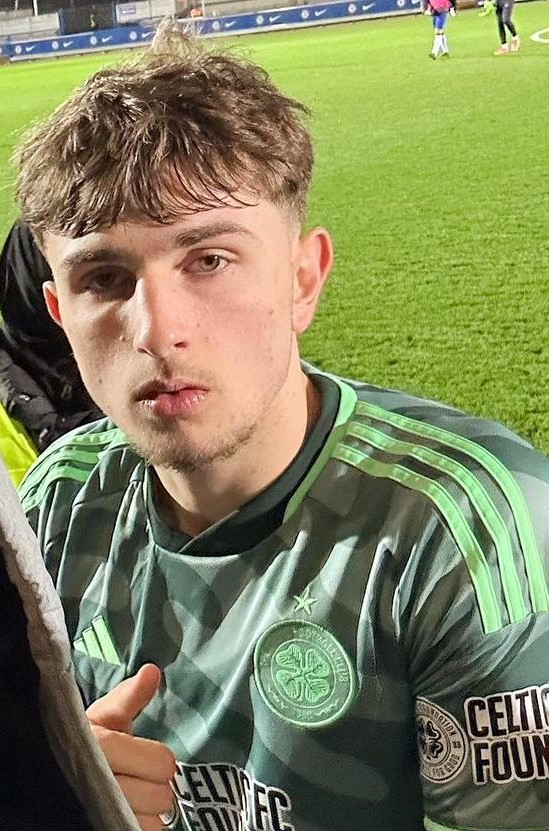
Vata with Celtic in 2024.

Born in Glasgow, Vata followed in the footsteps of his father, former professional footballer and Celtic player Rudi Vata by joining Celtic at the age of seven. He signed his first professional contract with the club in July 2021.

He was included in pre-season training with the Celtic first team ahead of the 2022–23 season, but was assigned to the club's B team in 2022, making his debut in the Lowland League the same year. Following impressive performances for Celtic's youth and B teams, he is seen as one of Celtic and Ireland's most promising players, and was linked with Italian clubs Juventus, Roma and AC Milan, as well as English sides Arsenal and Manchester City in October 2022.

Vata made his first team debut for Celtic on 28 December 2022, coming on as a substitute for Matt O'Riley as Celtic beat Hibernian 4–0 away at Easter Road. He scored his first senior goal in a 5–0 rout of Buckie Thistle on 21 January 2024 in the 2023–24 Scottish Cup.

=== Watford ===
On 5 July 2024, Vata signed for EFL Championship club Watford on a four-year contract.

== International career ==
Vata is eligible to represent Albania through his father (who played for the Albania national team), the Republic of Ireland through his grandmother on his mother's side, Scotland through his mother and by virtue of being born there, Montenegro.

On 31 August 2023, Vata received his first call up to the Republic of Ireland U21 squad for their 2025 UEFA European Under-21 Championship qualification fixtures against Turkey U21 and San Marino U21 on 8 and 12 September 2023. He made his U21 debut in the San Marino game, scoring twice in a 3–0 win at Turners Cross. On 22 March 2024, he scored a hat-trick on his second appearance for the side, in a 7–0 win away to San Marino U21.

On 13 March 2025, Vata received his first call up to the Republic of Ireland senior team, for their UEFA Nations League games against Bulgaria.

== Personal life ==
Rocco is the son of former footballer Rudi Vata.

== Career statistics ==
=== Club ===
As of match played 18 September 2026

Appearances and goals by club, season and competition
Club	Season	League			National cup (Note: Includes Scottish Cup, FA Cup)		League cup (Note: Includes EFL Cup)		Other		Total	
Club	Season	Division	Apps	Goals	Apps	Goals	Apps	Goals	Apps	Goals	Apps	Goals
Celtic B	2021–22	Lowland League	24	7	—		—		0	0	24	7
Celtic B	2022–23	Lowland League	16	9	—		—		2 (Note: Appearance(s) in the Scottish Challenge Cup)	1	18	10
Celtic B	2023–24	Lowland League	15	12	—		—		1	1	16	13
Celtic B	Total		55	28	—		—		3	2	58	30
Celtic	2022–23	Scottish Premiership	4	0	0	0	0	0	0	0	4	0
Celtic	2023–24	Scottish Premiership	1	0	1	1	0	0	0	0	2	1
Celtic	Total		5	0	1	1	0	0	0	0	6	1
Watford	2024–25	Championship	33	3	1	1	3	0	—		37	5
Watford	2025–26	Championship	12	2	0	0	0	0	—		12	2
Watford	2026–27	Championship	7	0	0	0	2	0	—		9	0
Watford	Total		52	5	1	1	5	0	—		58	7
Career total			112	33	2	2	5	0	3	2	122	38

=== International ===
As of match played 17 November 2025

Appearances and goals by national team and year
National team	Year	Apps	Goals
Republic of Ireland
Republic of Ireland	2025	1	0
Republic of Ireland	2026	3	0
Total		4	0

== Honours ==
Celtic

- Scottish Premiership: 2022–23, 2023–24
- Scottish Cup: 2023–24
