= 2025–26 Watford F.C. season =

English football team season

Watford
2025–26 season
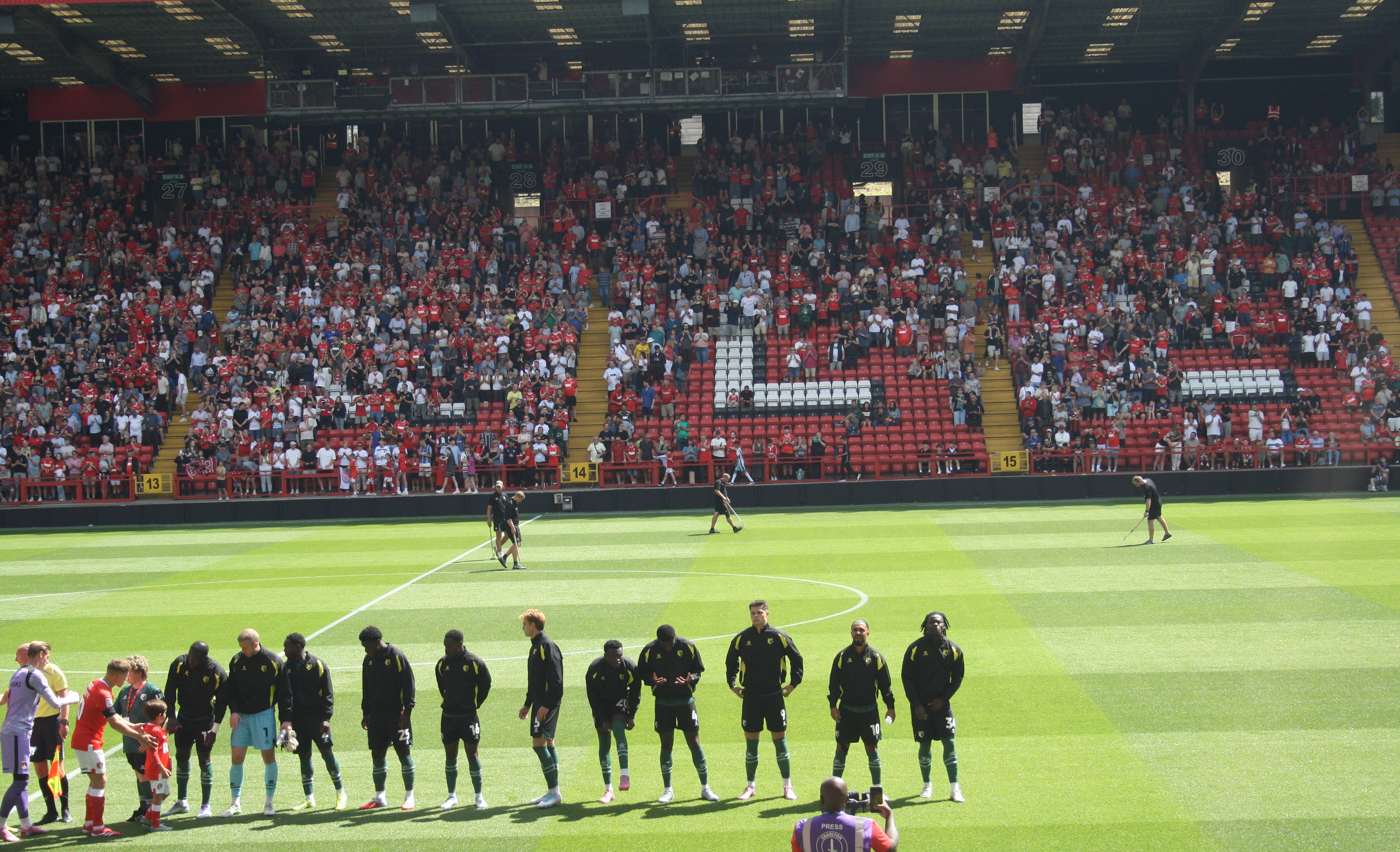
- Watford’s starting eleven prior to the opening match against Charlton Athletic on 9 August
- Owner: Gino Pozzo
- Chairman: Scott Duxbury
- Head coach: Paulo Pezzolano (until 8 October); Javi Gracia (from 8 October to 1 February); Edward Still (from 9 February)
- Stadium: Vicarage Road
- Championship: 16th
- FA Cup: Third round
- EFL Cup: First round
- Top goalscorer: League: Luca Kjerrumgaard (9); All: Luca Kjerrumgaard (9)
- Biggest win: 3–0 v Middlesbrough; 3–0 v Birmingham City
- Biggest defeat: 1–5 v Bristol City; 1–5 v Middlesbrough; 0–4 v Coventry City

The 2025–26 season was the 127th season in the history of Watford Football Club, and their fourth consecutive season in the Championship. In addition to the domestic league, the club also participated in the FA Cup and the EFL Cup.

== Managerial changes ==
Prior to the season starting, Paulo Pezzolano was appointed as the new Head Coach. On 8 October, he was sacked after just 10 games in charge and a win percentage of 30%, he was replaced by former head coach Javi Gracia. On 1 February, Gracia then resigned after twenty one games. A week later, Edward Still was appointed as the new head coach signing a two-and-a-half year deal having previously been in temporary charge at Anderlecht.

== Transfers and contracts ==
=== In ===
| Date | Pos. | Player | From | Fee | Ref. |
|---|---|---|---|---|---|
| 1 July 2025 (Note: The transfer was announced on 2 June, and would become official on 1 July once his Bolton contract had ended) | GK | (England) Nathan Baxter | (England) Bolton Wanderers | Free | |
| 1 July 2025 (Note: The transfer was announced on 6 June, and would become official on 1 July once his Samsunspor contract had ended) | LB | (England) Marc Bola | (Turkey) Samsunspor | Free | |
| 1 July 2025 (Note: The transfer was announced on 19 May, and would become official on 1 July once his Peterborough contract had ended) | CDM | (Cyprus) Hector Kyprianou | (England) Peterborough United | Free | |
| 5 July 2025 | CF | (Portugal) Vivaldo Semedo | (Italy) Udinese | Undisclosed | |
| 11 July 2025 | RW | (Morocco) Othmane Maamma | (France) Montpellier | Undisclosed | |
| 18 July 2025 | RW | (Australia) Nestory Irankunda | (Germany) Bayern Munich | £3,500,000 | |
| 30 July 2025 | LW | (England) Remerio Moulton | (England) Brighton & Hove Albion | Free | |
| 28 August 2025 | CDM | (Senegal) Nampalys Mendy | (France) Lens | Free | |
| 1 September 2025 | LW | (Georgia (country)) Nikoloz Chikovani | (Georgia (country)) Dinamo Tbilisi | £500,000 | |
| 1 September 2025 | RB | (Martinique) Jeremy Petris | (Belgium) Sporting Charleroi | £1,300,000 | |
| 21 January 2026 | CM | (Italy) Edoardo Bove | (Italy) AS Roma | Free | |

=== Out ===
| Date | Pos. | Player | To | Fee | Ref. |
|---|---|---|---|---|---|
| 19 June 2025 | CB | (Chile) Francisco Sierralta | (France) Auxerre | £1,500,000 | |
| 15 July 2025 | CF | (Denmark) Mileta Rajović | (Poland) Legia Warsaw | £2,600,000 | |
| 29 July 2025 | CB | (Croatia) Antonio Tikvić | (Germany) Preußen Münster | £610,000 | |
| 4 August 2025 | CB | (Scotland) Ryan Porteous | (United States) Los Angeles | £750,000 | |
| 6 August 2025 | RB | (Portugal) João Ferreira | (France) Saint-Étienne | £2,600,000 | |
| 31 August 2025 | RB | (England) Ryan Andrews | (Switzerland) Young Boys | £2,600,000 | |
| 2 February 2026 | LB | (England) James Morris | (England) Leyton Orient | Free Transfer | |
| 2 February 2026 | CM | (France) Moussa Sissoko | (Greece) Panathinaikos | £300,000 | |

Income: ▲ ≈ £10,960,000 (all fees converted into GBP)

=== Loaned in ===
| Date | Pos. | Player | From | Date until | Ref. |
|---|---|---|---|---|---|
| 30 June 2025 | CB | (Republic of Ireland) James Abankwah | (Italy) Udinese | 31 May 2026 | |
| 16 July 2025 | CF | (Denmark) Luca Kjerrumgaard | (Italy) Udinese | 31 May 2026 | |
| 22 July 2025 | LB | (United States) Caleb Wiley | (England) Chelsea | 9 January 2026 (Note: On 9 January, Wiley was recalled from his season-long from Chelsea) | |
| 8 August 2025 | CB | (England) Max Alleyne | (England) Manchester City | 5 January 2026 (Note: On 5 January, Alleyne was recalled from his season-long from Manchester City) | |
| 1 September 2025 | CB | (Senegal) Formose Mendy | (France) Lorient | 31 May 2026 (Note: Option to buy when loan deal concludes) | |
| 30 January 2026 | CB | (England) Stephen Mfuni | (England) Manchester City | 31 May 2026 | |
| 2 February 2026 | CB | (Georgia (country)) Saba Goglichidze | (Italy) Udinese | 31 May 2026 | |
| 3 February 2026 | CDM | (France) Pierre Ekwah | (France) Saint-Étienne | 31 May 2026 | |

=== Loaned out ===
| Date | Pos. | Player | To | Date until | Ref. |
|---|---|---|---|---|---|
| 27 June 2025 | RW | (England) Michael Adu-Poku | (England) Barrow | 21 January 2026 (Note: On 21 January, Abu-Poku was recalled from his season-long loan at Barrow and subsequently joined Wealdstone on loan) | |
| 30 June 2025 | GK | (England) Myles Roberts | (England) Walsall | 31 May 2026 | |
| 15 July 2025 | CB | (England) James Clarridge | (England) Aldershot Town | 1 January 2026 | |
| 29 July 2025 | CF | (Colombia) Jorge Hurtado | (Colombia) Millonarios | 31 May 2026 | |
| 12 August 2025 | GK | (Austria) Daniel Bachmann | (Spain) Deportivo La Coruña | 30 January 2026 (Note: On 30 January, Bachmann's initial season-long loan at Deportivo La Coruña was terminated) | |
| 23 August 2025 | CF | (England) Jonathan Lawson | (England) Banbury United | 28 November 2025 (Note: On 27 September, Lawson's loan at Banbury was extended until mid-January, but on 28 November he was recalled to the club) | |
| 20 August 2025 | RW | (England) Zavier Massiah-Edwards | (England) Eastleigh | 14 October 2025 (Note: On 16 September, Massiah-Edwards' loan at Eastleigh was extended by a further month) | |
| 1 September 2025 | CB | (England) Travis Akomeah | (England) Gillingham | 31 May 2026 (Note: On 21 January, Akomeah's loan at Gillingham was extended until the end of the season) | |
| 12 September 2025 | CM | (Nigeria) Tom Dele-Bashiru | (Turkey) Gençlerbirliği | 31 May 2026 | |
| 13 September 2025 | GK | (England) Sam Morris | (England) Northwood | 12 October 2025 | |
| 29 September 2025 | LW | (Georgia (country)) Nikoloz Chikovani | (Belgium) Royal Charleroi | 31 December 2025 | |
| 30 September 2025 | CB | (England) Tom Georgiou | (England) Leverstock Green | 5 January 2026 (Note: On 31 October, Georgiou's loan at Leverstock was extended by a further month. On 27 November, it was extended again until early January) | |
| 1 November 2025 | CF | (England) Kash Odiase | (England) Royston Town | 27 November 2025 | |
| 8 November 2025 | GK | (Sweden) Jonathan Macaulay | (England) Ebbsfleet United | 2 February 2026 (Note: On 12 December, Macaulay's loan at Ebbsfleet was extended for another month. Then on 10 January it was extended further for another month) | |
| 8 November 2025 | RB | (England) Ollie Stephenson | (England) Royston Town | 5 January 2026 (Note: On 8 December, Stephenson's loan at Royston was extended by a further month) | |
| 11 November 2025 | CDM | (England) Leo Ramirez-Espain | (England) Yeovil Town | 16 December 2025 (Note: On 16 December, Ramirez-Espain was recalled from his loan at Yeovil) | |
| 28 November 2025 | LW | (England) Josh Keyes | (England) Potters Bar Town | 27 December 2025 | |
| 29 November 2025 | GK | (South Africa) Roraigh Browne | (England) Welling United | 27 December 2025 | |
| 8 December 2025 | CAM | (Latvia) Marats Galajevs | (England) Royston Town | 30 December 2025 | |
| 12 December 2025 | GK | (England) Zack Braverman | (England) AFC Dunstable | 7 January 2026 | |
| 19 December 2025 | GK | (Cyprus) Gabriel Ortelli | (England) St Albans City | 15 February 2026 (Note: On 17 January, Ortelli's loan at St Albans City was extended for a further month) | |
| 2 January 2026 | CF | (England) Tobi Adeyemo | (England) Crawley Town | 31 May 2026 | |
| 10 January 2026 | CF | (England) Jonathan Lawson | (England) Folkestone Invicta | 7 February 2026 | |
| 16 January 2026 | LW | (England) Remiero Moulton | (England) Worthing | 31 May 2026 (Note: On 16 February, Moulton's loan at Worthing was extended until the end of the season) | |
| 21 January 2026 | RW | (England) Michael Adu-Poku | (England) Wealdstone | 31 May 2026 (Note: On 18 February, Abu-Poku's loan at Wealdstone was extended by a further month. Then on 24 March, it was extended further until the end of the season) | |
| 24 January 2026 | RW | (England) Zavier Massiah-Edwards | (England) Braintree Town | 31 May 2026 | |
| 24 January 2026 | CM | (England) Amar Sanghrajka | (England) St Albans City | 22 March 2026 (Note: On 24 February, Sanghrajka's loan at St Albans City was extended by a further month) | |
| 30 January 2026 | GK | (Austria) Daniel Bachmann | (England) Leyton Orient | 31 May 2026 | |
| 5 February 2026 | CF | (England) Kash Odiase | (England) Walton & Hersham | 5 March 2026 | |
| 23 February 2026 | GK | (England) Zack Braverman | (England) Walthamstow | 31 March 2026 | |
| 3 March 2026 | GK | (England) Alfie Marriott | (England) Slough Town | 6 April 2026 (Note: On 6 April, Marriott was recalled from his short-term loan at Slough Town) | |
| 3 March 2026 | LB | (England) Tyler Notley | (England) Northwood | 31 March 2026 | |
| 10 March 2026 | CB | (England) Ian Kamga | (England) Peterborough Sports | 25 April 2026 | |
| 14 March 2026 | GK | (England) Sebastian Thrussell | (England) Concord Rangers | 25 April 2026 | |
| 23 March 2026 | GK | (South Africa) Roraigh Browne | (England) Maidenhead United | 31 May 2026 | |
| 28 March 2026 | CB | (England) James Clarridge | (England) Braintree Town | 31 May 2026 | |
| 29 March 2026 | GK | (England) Finley Murray | (England) Hendon | 31 May 2026 | |

=== Released / Out of Contract ===
| Date | Pos. | Player | Subsequent club | Join date | Ref. |
|---|---|---|---|---|---|
| 30 June 2025 | CB | (Wales) George Abbott | (Poland) Górnik Łęczna | 12 July 2025 | |
| 30 June 2025 | CM | (England) Freddie Buers | | | |
| 30 June 2025 | CB | (Australia) Aidan Coyne | | | |
| 30 June 2025 | CM | (England) Zak Fraser-Grante | | | |
| 30 June 2025 | CM | (England) Ignacio Garcia-Romero | | | |
| 30 June 2025 | DM | (England) Luigi Gaspar | | | |
| 30 June 2025 | CB | (Scotland) Ali Gould | | | |
| 30 June 2025 | CB | (Italy) Angelo Ogbonna | | | |
| 30 June 2025 | LM | (Republic of Ireland) Prince Sikiru | | | |
| 30 June 2025 | CF | (England) Jake Watkiss | | | |

=== New Contract ===
| Date | Pos. | Player | Contract until | Ref. |
|---|---|---|---|---|
| 22 July 2025 | CM | (England) Hayden Barrett | 30 June 2026 (Note: First professional contract) (Note: Option for a further year) | |
| 22 July 2025 | LM | (Latvia) Marats Galajevs | 30 June 2027 | |
| 22 July 2025 | CB | (England) Tom Georgiou | 30 June 2027 | |
| 22 July 2025 | RB | (England) Conrad Hunt | 30 June 2026 | |
| 22 July 2025 | CF | (England) Jonathan Lawson | 30 June 2026 | |
| 22 July 2025 | GK | (England) Sam Morris | 30 June 2027 | |
| 22 July 2025 | CF | (England) Kash Odiase | 30 June 2027 | |
| 22 July 2025 | CM | (England) Omar Sanghrajka | 30 June 2027 | |
| 22 July 2025 | RW | (Ukraine) Kristian Shevchenko | 30 June 2026 | |
| 22 July 2025 | CF | (England) Max Smith | 30 June 2027 | |
| 22 July 2025 | RB | (England) Ollie Stephenson | 30 June 2027 | |
| 22 July 2025 | LB | (Romania) Raul Vancea | 30 June 2027 | |
| 21 November 2025 | CB | (England) Joshua Mullins | 30 June 2027 | |
| 21 November 2025 | GK | (Cyprus) Gabriel Ortelli | 30 June 2029 | |
| 10 December 2025 | LW | (Afghanistan) Amin Nabizada | 30 June 2030 | |

== Pre-season and friendlies ==
On 30 May, Watford announced their first two pre-season friendlies, against Boreham Wood and Leyton Orient. Ten days later, a third fixture was added against AFC Wimbledon. A home friendly was later announced, against Deportivo La Coruña.

Win Draw Loss Fixtures

| 8 July 2025 Friendly | Boreham Wood | 0–2 | Watford | Borehamwood |
| 19:30 BST | | Report | Louza 27'; Nabizada 70' | Stadium: Meadow Park |

| 12 July 2025 Friendly | AFC Wimbledon | 1–1 | Watford | Ruislip |
| 15:00 BST | Dwomoh 68' | Report | Kelly 61' | Stadium: Grosvenor Vale |

| 26 July 2025 Friendly | Leyton Orient | 1–1 | Watford | Leyton |
| 15:00 BST | Sissoko 55' | Report | Bakinson 53' | Stadium: Brisbane Road |

| 30 July 2025 Friendly | Watford | 1–0 | Deportivo La Coruña | Watford |
| 19:45 BST | Grieves 20' | Report | | Stadium: Vicarage Road |

== Competitions ==
=== Overall record ===
| Competition | First match | Last match | Starting round | Final position | Record | | | | | | | |
| Competition | First match | Last match | Starting round | Final position | Pld | W | D | L | GF | GA | GD | Win % |
|---|---|---|---|---|---|---|---|---|---|---|---|---|
| Championship | 9 August 2025 | 2 May 2026 | Matchday 1 | 16th | 46 | 14 | 15 | 17 | 53 | 65 | −12 | 30.43 |
| FA Cup | 10 January 2026 | | Third round | Third round | 1 | 0 | 0 | 1 | 1 | 5 | −4 | 0.00 |
| EFL Cup | 12 August 2025 | | First round | First round | 1 | 0 | 0 | 1 | 1 | 2 | −1 | 0.00 |
| Total | | | | | 48 | 14 | 15 | 19 | 55 | 72 | −17 | 29.17 |

Source: Soccerway

=== Championship ===
==== League table ====
| Pos | Team | Pld | W | D | L | GF | GA | GD | Pts |
|---|---|---|---|---|---|---|---|---|---|
| 14 | Preston North End | 46 | 15 | 15 | 16 | 55 | 62 | −7 | 60 |
| 15 | Queens Park Rangers | 46 | 16 | 10 | 20 | 61 | 73 | −12 | 58 |
| 16 | Watford | 46 | 14 | 15 | 17 | 53 | 65 | −12 | 57 |
| 17 | Stoke City | 46 | 15 | 10 | 21 | 51 | 56 | −5 | 55 |
| 18 | Portsmouth | 46 | 14 | 13 | 19 | 49 | 64 | −15 | 55 |

Source: EFL Official Website
Rules for classification: 1) Points; 2) Goal difference; 3) Number of goals scored; 4) Head-to-head results; 5) Wins; 6) Away goals; 7) Penalty points (sec 9.5); 8) Number of 12-point sending off offences; 9) Play-off (only if needed to determine promotion/relegation)

==== Results summary ====
| Overall | | | | | | | | Home | | | | | | Away | | | | | |
| Pld | W | D | L | GF | GA | GD | Pts | W | D | L | GF | GA | GD | W | D | L | GF | GA | GD |
|---|---|---|---|---|---|---|---|---|---|---|---|---|---|---|---|---|---|---|---|
| 46 | 14 | 15 | 17 | 53 | 65 | −12 | 57 | 10 | 7 | 6 | 30 | 27 | +3 | 4 | 8 | 11 | 23 | 38 | −15 |

Source: Soccerway

==== Results by round ====
| Round | 1 | 2 | 3 | 4 | 5 | 6 | 7 | 8 | 9 | 10 | 11 | 12 | 13 | 14 | 15 | 16 | 17 | 18 | 19 | 20 | 21 | 22 | 23 | 24 | 25 | 27 | 28 | 29 | 30 | 26^{1} | 31 | 32 | 33 | 34 | 35 | 37 | 38 | 36^{2} | 39 | 40 | 41 | 42 | 43 | 44 | 45 | 46 |
|---|---|---|---|---|---|---|---|---|---|---|---|---|---|---|---|---|---|---|---|---|---|---|---|---|---|---|---|---|---|---|---|---|---|---|---|---|---|---|---|---|---|---|---|---|---|---|
| Ground | A | H | A | H | H | A | H | A | H | A | H | A | H | A | H | A | H | A | H | H | A | H | A | A | H | H | H | A | H | A | A | A | H | H | A | A | A | H | H | A | H | A | H | A | A | H |
| Result | L | W | D | D | L | L | W | D | W | L | W | L | W | D | D | W | D | L | W | D | D | W | W | W | W | L | D | D | L | D | L | D | W | L | W | D | L | W | D | L | D | L | L | L | L | L |
| Position | 22 | 14 | 12 | 14 | 17 | 21 | 16 | 16 | 11 | 15 | 12 | 14 | 10 | 12 | 15 | 11 | 14 | 15 | 10 | 13 | 13 | 10 | 8 | 6 | 4 | 8 | 7 | 8 | 10 | 8 | 11 | 12 | 9 | 12 | 9 | 9 | 10 | 9 | 9 | 9 | 10 | 12 | 13 | 15 | 16 | 16 |
| Points | 0 | 3 | 4 | 5 | 5 | 5 | 8 | 9 | 12 | 12 | 15 | 15 | 18 | 19 | 20 | 23 | 24 | 24 | 27 | 28 | 29 | 32 | 35 | 38 | 41 | 41 | 42 | 43 | 43 | 44 | 44 | 45 | 48 | 48 | 51 | 52 | 52 | 55 | 56 | 56 | 57 | 57 | 57 | 57 | 57 | 57 |

Source: Soccerway
A = Away; H = Home; W = Win; D = Draw; L = Loss; P = Postponed
Notes:
- ^{1} Matchday 26 (v. Hull City) was postponed due to a frozen pitch.
- ^{2} Matchday 36 (v. Wrexham) was postponed due to the opponents' involvement in the FA Cup.

==== Matches ====
On 26 June, the Championship fixtures were released.

Win Draw Loss Fixtures

| 9 August 2025 1 | Charlton Athletic | 1–0 | Watford | Charlton |
| 12:30 BST | Docherty (yellow card) 48'; Knibbs 90+4' | Report | Kyprianou (yellow card) 25'; Baah (yellow card) 52' | Stadium: The Valley; Attendance: 21,778; Referee: Stephen Martin |

| 16 August 2025 2 | Watford | 2–1 | Queens Park Rangers | Watford |
| 15:00 BST | Kjerrumgaard 18', 23'; Kayembe (yellow card) 65'; Louza (red card) 90+3' | Report | Mbengue (yellow card) 40'; Morgan 45+4'; Dembélé (yellow card) 79' | Stadium: Vicarage Road; Attendance: 19,571; Referee: Tony Harrington |

| 23 August 2025 3 | Swansea City | 1–1 | Watford | Landore |
| 12:30 BST | Stamenić (yellow card) 54'; Vipotnik 82'; Galbraith (yellow card) 90+4'; Tymon (yellow card) 90+7' | Report | Irankunda 35'; Kyprianou (yellow card) 39'; Ngakia (yellow card) 70'; Morris (yellow card) 90+4'; Andrews (yellow card) 90+9'; Baah (yellow card) 90+10' | Stadium: Swansea.com Stadium; Attendance: 15,543; Referee: Stephen Martin |
Note: Fixture was originally scheduled for a 15:00 kick-off, but was moved live Sky Sports broadcasting.

| 30 August 2025 4 | Watford | 2–2 | Southampton | Watford |
| 15:00 BST | Baah 65'; Irankunda 81' | Report | Archer 10'; Manning 78' | Stadium: Vicarage Road; Attendance: 19,075; Referee: Farai Hallam |

| 13 September 2025 5 | Watford | 0–1 | Blackburn Rovers | Watford |
| 15:00 BST | Pollock (yellow card) 67' | Report | Mitoshita 47'; Cantwell (yellow card) 58'; Hedges (yellow card) 78' | Stadium: Vicarage Road; Attendance: 17,964; Referee: Dean Whitestone |

| 22 September 2025 6 | Millwall | 1–0 | Watford | Bermondsey |
| 20:00 BST | Neghli 10'; Bryan (yellow card) 30' | | | Stadium: The Den; Attendance: 14,586; Referee: Joshua Smith |
Note: Fixture was originally scheduled for 20 September, but was moved live Sky Sports broadcasting.

| 27 September 2025 7 | Watford | 2–1 | Hull City | Watford |
| 15:00 BST | Louza 60'; Semedo 78' | Report | McBurnie 25'; Lundstram (yellow card) 12'; Giles (yellow card) 30'; Drameh (yellow card) 50'; Coyle (yellow card) 90+2'; Akintola (yellow card) 90+4' | Stadium: Vicarage Road; Attendance: 17,973; Referee: Oliver Langford |

| 1 October 2025 8 | Portsmouth | 2–2 | Watford | Milton |
| 19:45 BST | Yang Min-hyeok 5', (yellow card) 13'; Segečić 79'; Pack (yellow card) 90+5' | Report | Alleyne (yellow card) 2'; Petris (yellow card) 43'; Louza 46', (yellow card) 77'; Vata 56'; Selvik (yellow card) 77'; Pollock (yellow card) 89' | Stadium: Fratton Park; Attendance: 19,646; Referee: Ben Toner |

| 4 October 2025 9 | Watford | 2–1 | Oxford | Watford |
| 15:00 BST | Ngakia 45', 45+4'; Keben (yellow card) 39'; Kjerrumgaard (yellow card) 49'; Louza (yellow card) 53' | Report | Alleyne , 3' (o.g.); Brannagan (yellow card) 5'; Mills (yellow card) 30'; Helik (yellow card) 45+5'; Currie (yellow card) 90+2' | Stadium: Vicarage Road; Attendance: 19,187; Referee: Lewis Smith |

| 18 October 2025 10 | Sheffield United | 1–0 | Watford | Sheffield |
| 15:00 BST | O'Hare 59' | Report | Keben (yellow card) 54' | Stadium: Brammall Lane; Attendance: 27,431; Referee: Bobby Madley |

| 22 October 2025 11 | Watford | 2–1 | West Bromwich Albion | Watford |
| 19:45 BST | Louza 38'; Vata 58' | Report | Price 34'; Styles (yellow card) 42'; Heggebø (yellow card) 46' | Stadium: Vicarage Road; Attendance: 17,308; Referee: Leigh Doughty |

| 25 October 2025 12 | Coventry City | 3–1 | Watford | Coventry |
| 12:30 BST | Thomas-Asante 3'; Allen 7'; Sakamoto 42'; Woolfenden (yellow card) 62'; Van Ewijk (yellow card) 76'; Kitching (yellow card) 85' | Report | Abankwah (red card) 44'; Doumbia (yellow card) 45+3'; Louza 69' (pen.); Irankunda (yellow card) 90+2' | Stadium: Coventry Building Society Arena; Attendance: 30,109; Referee: Dean Whitestone |
Note: Fixture was originally scheduled for a 15:00 kick-off, but was rescheduled for live Sky Sports broadcasting.

| 1 November 2025 13 | Watford | 3–0 | Middlesbrough | Watford |
| 15:00 GMT | Louza 15'; Kjerrumgaard 32'; Baah (yellow card) 34'; Keben (yellow card) 45'; Doumbia 49' | Report | Ayling (yellow card) 57' | Stadium: Vicarage Road; Attendance: 19200; Referee: John Busby |

| 4 November 2025 14 | Ipswich Town | 1–1 | Watford | Ipswich |
| 19:45 GMT | Louza 16'; Baah (yellow card) 45+1'; Bola (yellow card) 59' | Report | Philogene 21'; Hirst (yellow card) 55' | Stadium: Portman Road; Attendance: 27184; Referee: David Webb |

| 7 November 2025 15 | Watford | 1–1 | Bristol City | Watford |
| 20:00 GMT | Bola 6'; Petris (yellow card) 28'; Irankunda (yellow card) 33' | Report | Twine 29'; Mehmeti (yellow card) 53' | Stadium: Vicarage Road; Attendance: 19,574; Referee: Paul Tierney |
Note: Fixture was originally scheduled for 8 November, but was rescheduled for live Sky Sports broadcasting.

| 22 November 2025 16 | Derby County | 2–3 | Watford | Derby |
| 15:00 GMT | Sanderson 36', (yellow card) 39'; Langås 54'; Brereton (yellow card) 56' | Report | Kjerrumgaard 61'; Kayembe (yellow card) 68', (goal) 85' (pen.), 88' | Stadium: Pride Park Stadium; Attendance: 29442; Referee: Gavin Ward |

| 25 November 2025 17 | Watford | 1–1 | Preston North End | Watford |
| 19:45 GMT | Doumbia 45+1'; Kyprianou (yellow card) 71'; Irankunda (yellow card) 90+6' | Report | Jebbison 22'; Devine (yellow card) 37'; Hughes (yellow card) 84'; Þórðarson (yellow card) 87'; Lindsay (yellow card) 90+1' | Stadium: Vicarage Road; Attendance: 16113; Referee: James Bell |

| 1 December 2025 18 | Birmingham City | 2–1 | Watford | Bordesley |
| 20:00 GMT | Doyle (yellow card) 24'; Paik 31'; Gray 43'; Stansfield (yellow card) 78'; Roberts (yellow card) 80' | Report | Kyprianou (yellow card) 20'; Maamma 61'; Louza (yellow card) 76' | Stadium: St Andrew's; Attendance: 26,086; Referee: Adam Herczeg |
Note: Fixture was originally scheduled for 29 November, but was rescheduled for live Sky Sports broadcasting.

| 6 December 2025 19 | Watford | 3–2 | Norwich City | Watford |
| 12:30 GMT | Chakvetadze (yellow card) 24'; Kjerrumgaard 33', 61'; Ince (yellow card) 78' | Report | Darling (yellow card) 8'; Sargent 11'; Schwartau 45'; Kovačević (yellow card) 54' | Stadium: Vicarage Road; Attendance: 18,871; Referee: Tom Nield |
Note: Fixture was originally scheduled for a 15:00 kick-off, but was rescheduled for live Sky Sports broadcasting.

| 9 December 2025 20 | Watford | 1–1 | Sheffield Wednesday | Watford |
| 19:45 GMT | Maamma (yellow card) 11'; Semedo 90+7' | Report | McNeill 17'; Chalobah (yellow card) 90+4' | Stadium: Vicarage Road; Attendance: 16,834; Referee: Dean Whitestone |

| 13 December 2025 21 | Wrexham | 2–2 | Watford | Wrexham |
| 15:00 GMT | Windass 21', (yellow card) 45'; Moore (yellow card) 38'; Rathbone 90+2'; Sheaf (yellow card) 90+10' | Report | Doumbia 30', (yellow card) 82'; Maamma 42'; Bola (yellow card) 45'; Alleyne (yellow card) 58'; Chakvetadze (yellow card) 81'; Louza (yellow card) 90+3'; Kyprianou (yellow card) 90+9' | Stadium: Racecourse Ground; Attendance: 10,667; Referee: Jacob Miles |

| 20 December 2025 22 | Watford | 1–0 | Stoke City | Watford |
| 15:00 GMT | Kjerrumgaard 74'; Semedo (yellow card) 66'; Pollock (yellow card) 69'; Irankunda (yellow card) 89' | Report | Boženík (yellow card) 30'; Thomas (yellow card) 59'; Talovierov (yellow card) 83' | Stadium: Vicarage Road; Attendance: 19285; Referee: Ben Toner |

| 26 December 2025 23 | Leicester City | 1–2 | Watford | Leicester |
| 15:00 GMT | James 7'; Fatawu (yellow card) 19'; Skipp (yellow card) 42'; Cordova-Reid (yellow card) 63' | Report | Maamma 45'; Pollock 65'; Louza (yellow card) 48'; Kyprianou (yellow card) 61' | Stadium: King Power Stadium; Attendance: – Referee: Josh Smith |

| 29 December 2025 24 | Norwich City | 0–1 | Watford | Norwich |
| 19:45 GMT | | Report | Semedo 90'; Ngakia (yellow card) 66' | Stadium: Carrow Road; Attendance: 26553; Referee: Matt Corlett |

| 1 January 2026 25 | Watford | 3–0 | Birmingham City | Watford |
| 15:00 GMT | Ince 9', 38', 60'; Pollock (yellow card) 43' | Report | Paik Seung-Ho (yellow card) 78' | Stadium: Vicarage Road; Attendance: 20,816; Referee: Lewis Smith |

| 17 January 2026 27 | Watford | 0–2 | Millwall | Watford |
| 12:30 GMT | Kyprianou (yellow card) 45+4'; Chakvetadze (yellow card) 54'; Irankunda (yellow card) 89'; Pollock (yellow card) 89' | Report | Mitchell (yellow card) 49'; Doughty (yellow card) 66'; Azeez 69'; Neghli (yellow card) 71'; Coburn 81'; Crama (yellow card) 89' | Stadium: Vicarage Road; Attendance: 19,074; Referee: Ruebyn Ricardo |
Note: Fixture was initially scheduled for a 15:00 kick-off, but was rescheduled for live Sky Sports broadcasting.

| 21 January 2026 28 | Watford | 1–1 | Portsmouth | Watford |
| 19:45 GMT | Doumbia 79'; Irankunda (yellow card) 90+10' | Report | Dozzell (yellow card) 51'; Segečić 73' | Stadium: Vicarage Road; Attendance: 17,577; Referee: Ben Toner |

| 24 January 2026 29 | Blackburn Rovers | 1–1 | Watford | Blackburn |
| 15:00 GMT | Miller 28' | Report | Kayembe 26', (yellow card) 90+3'; Kyprianou (yellow card) 45+2' | Stadium: Ewood Park; Attendance: 11,640; Referee: Adam Herczeg |

| 31 January 2026 30 | Watford | 0–2 | Swansea City | Watford |
| 15:00 GMT | Louza (yellow card) 53'; Irankunda (red card) 90+2' | Report | Burgess (yellow card) 7'; Stamenić 55'; Key 80'; Cullen (yellow card) 90+2' | Stadium: Vicarage Road; Attendance: 18,691; Referee: Matt Corlett |

| 3 February 2026 26 | Hull City | 0–0 | Watford | Hull |
| 19:45 GMT | Coyle (yellow card) 73'; Giles (yellow card) 79'; Lundstram (yellow card) 82'; McBurnie (yellow card) 87' | Report | Mfuni (yellow card) 34'; Ngakia (yellow card) 45+1'; Doumbia (yellow card) 72' | Stadium: MKM Stadium; Attendance: 20,441; Referee: Leigh Doughty |
Note: Fixture was originally scheduled for 4 January, but it was postponed due to a frozen pitch.

| 7 February 2026 31 | Southampton | 1–0 | Watford | Southampton |
| 12:30 GMT | Harwood-Bellis (yellow card) 53'; Larin 70'; Bree (yellow card) 75'; Charles (yellow card) 90+2' | Report | Chakvetadze (yellow card) 66' | Stadium: St Mary's Stadium; Attendance: 27,721 (2,600 away fans); Referee: Elliot Bell |
Note: Fixture was initially scheduled for a 15:00 kick-off, but was rescheduled for live Sky Sports broadcasting.

| 14 February 2026 32 | Preston North End | 2–2 | Watford | Preston |
| 15:00 GMT | Dobbin 19'; Osmajić 70'; Gibson (yellow card) 81' | Report | Maamma 55'; Offiah 57' (o.g.); Petris (yellow card) 89' | Stadium: Deepdale; Attendance: 14,611; Referee: Dean Whitestone |

| 21 February 2026 33 | Watford | 2–0 | Derby County | Watford |
| 15:00 GMT | Kjerrumgaard 5'; Doumbia (yellow card) 83', (goal) 90'; Chakvetadze (yellow card) 52' | Report | Clarke (yellow card) 23'; Elder (yellow card) 55' | Stadium: Vicarage Road; Attendance: 19,221; Referee: David Webb |

| 24 February 2026 34 | Watford | 0–2 | Ipswich Town | Watford |
| 19:45 GMT | Abankwah (yellow card) 25'; Irankunda (yellow card) 28'; Ince (penalty missed) 84' | Report | Walle Egeli 37'; Kipré (yellow card) 56'; Hirst 77'; Furlong (yellow card) 83'; Walton (yellow card) 85' | Stadium: Vicarage Road; Attendance: 18,249; Referee: Ben Toner |

| 27 February 2026 35 | Bristol City | 1–2 | Watford | Bristol |
| 20:00 GMT | Twine 36'; Neto Borges (yellow card) 26' | Report | Kjerrumgaard 7'; Ngakia (yellow card) 58', (goal) 77'; Mfuni (yellow card) 58'; Kayembe (yellow card) 86' | Stadium: Ashton Gate; Attendance: 21886; Referee: Lewis Smith |
Note: Fixture was initially scheduled for 28 February, but was rescheduled for live Sky Sports broadcasting.

| 10 March 2026 37 | Sheffield Wednesday | 1–1 | Watford | Owlerton |
| 19:45 GMT | Yates 54'; Heskey (yellow card) 63'; Adaramola (yellow card) 69'; Ingelsson (yellow card) 81' | Report | Goglichidze (yellow card) 31'; Abankwah (yellow card) 68'; Ekwah (yellow card) 76'; Semedo 90' | Stadium: Hillsborough Stadium; Attendance: 19,653; Referee: Elliot Bell |

| 14 March 2026 38 | Stoke City | 3–1 | Watford | Stoke-on-Trent |
| 15:00 GMT | Rigo (yellow card) 17'; Manhoef 28', 77'; Thomas (yellow card) 50'; Talovierov (yellow card) 60'; Simkin (yellow card) 72'; Gallagher 85' | Report | Mendy (yellow card) 51'; Irankunda 81', (yellow card) 90+3' | Stadium: bet365 Stadium; Attendance: 22,085 (1,338 away fans); Referee: Leigh Doughty |

| 17 March 2026 36 | Watford | 3–1 | Wrexham | Watford |
| 19:45 GMT | Bola 18'; Kayembe 38'; Bove 90+4', (yellow card) 90+5'; Chakvetadze (yellow card) 81' | Report | Clemworth 49' | Stadium: Vicarage Road; Attendance: 16378; Referee: Adam Herczeg |
Note: Fixture was initially scheduled for a 15:00 kick-off, but was moved for live Sky Sports broadcasting. It was then postponed due to Wrexham's involvement in the FA Cup fifth round.

| 21 March 2026 39 | Watford | 0–0 | Leicester City | Watford |
| 15:00 GMT | Mendy (yellow card) 12'; Doumbia (yellow card) 90+1'; Selvik (yellow card) 90+2' | Report | Mavididi (yellow card) 17'; Daka (penalty missed) 41'; James (yellow card) 42'; Fatawu (yellow card) 54'; De Cordova-Reid (yellow card) 90+2' | Stadium: Vicarage Road; Attendance: 19,493; Referee: Josh Smith |

| 3 April 2026 40 | Queens Park Rangers | 2–1 | Watford | Shepherd's Bush |
| 15:00 GMT | Kolli 26', (yellow card) 29'; Dunne (yellow card) 30'; Smyth (yellow card) 61', (goal) 63'; Kone (yellow card) 84'; Mbengue (yellow card) 87'; Poku (yellow card) 90+1' | Report | Bove (yellow card) 23'; Ekwah (yellow card) 49'; Goglichidze (yellow card) 62'; Louza 85', (yellow card) 90+1' | Stadium: Loftus Road; Attendance: 17,532 (1,736 away); Referee: Ruebyn Ricardo |

| 6 April 2026 41 | Watford | 1–1 | Charlton Athletic | Watford |
| 15:00 BST | Mendy (yellow card) 34'; Irankunda 74'; Selvik (yellow card) 90+15' | Report | Docherty (yellow card) 33'; Clarke (yellow card) 38'; Godden 62' | Stadium: Vicarage Road; Attendance: 19,961; Referee: Andrew Kitchen |

| 11 April 2026 42 | Oxford United | 2–0 | Watford | Littlemore |
| 15:00 BST | Peart-Harris 19', (yellow card) 59'; Harris 90+2' | Report | Irankunda (yellow card) 57'; Louza (yellow card) 71' | Stadium: Kassam Stadium; Attendance: 11,223 (1,391 away); Referee: Stephen Martin |

| 18 April 2026 43 | Watford | 0–2 | Sheffield United | Watford |
| 15:00 BST | Louza (yellow card) 26'; Pollock (yellow card) 90+7' | Report | Bamford 50', 59'; Hamer (yellow card) 65'; Ings (yellow card) 75'; Peck (yellow card) 81'; Chong (yellow card) 90+1' | Stadium: Vicarage Road; Attendance: 18,495; Referee: John Busby |

| 21 April 2026 44 | West Bromwich Albion | 3–0 | Watford | West Bromwich |
| 19:45 BST | Styles (yellow card) 11'; Price 21'; Imray (yellow card) 28', (goal) 69'; Dike 41'; Molumby (yellow card) 51'; Mowatt (yellow card) 86' | Report | Pollock (yellow card) 31'; Irankunda (yellow card) 45+1'; Abankwah (yellow card) 48' | Stadium: The Hawthorns; Attendance: 22,805; Referee: Anthony Backhouse |

| 25 April 2026 45 | Middlesbrough | 5–1 | Watford | Middlesbrough |
| 12:30 BST | Whittaker 6', 58'; Strelec 45+1'; Conway 75' (pen.), 90+2'; Morris (yellow card) 85' | Report | Abankwah 48', (yellow card) 74'; Louza (yellow card) 85' | Stadium: Riverside Stadium; Attendance: 27,482 (approx. 500 away); Referee: Adam Herczeg |
Note: Fixture was initially scheduled for a 15:00 kick-off, but was brought forward for live Sky Sports broadcasting.

| 2 May 2026 46 | Watford | 0–4 | Coventry City | Watford |
| 12:30 BST | Louza (yellow card) 25'; Irankunda (yellow card) 78' | Report | Simms 19', 43', 58'; Latibeaudiere (yellow card) 25'; Torp 85' | Stadium: Vicarage Road; Attendance: 19,174; Referee: Ruebyn Ricardo |

=== FA Cup ===
Watford were drawn away to Bristol City in the third round.

Win Draw Loss Fixtures

| 10 January 2026 Third round | Bristol City | 5–1 | Watford | Bristol |
| 17:45 GMT | Riis 2', 68', 76'; Mehmeti 37'; Atkinson 66'; Lumley (yellow card) 79' | Report | Abankwah (yellow card) 60'; Grieves 74' | Stadium: Ashton Gate; Attendance: 13,291; Referee: Tom Reeves |

=== EFL Cup ===
Watford were drawn at home to Norwich City in the first round.

Win Draw Loss Fixtures

| 12 August 2025 First round | Watford | 1–2 | Norwich City | Watford |
| 19:45 BST | Kayembe (yellow card) 49'; Baah 68' | Report | Sargent 10'; Núñez 24'; Medić (yellow card) 66' | Stadium: Vicarage Road; Attendance: 9,243; Referee: Dean Whitestone |

== Statistics ==
=== Appearances, goals and discipline ===
Players with no appearances are not included on the list; italics indicate loaned in player

| No. | Pos. | Nat. | Name | League | | FA Cup | | EFL Cup | | Total | | Discipline | |
| No. | Pos. | Nat. | Name | Apps | Goals | Apps | Goals | Apps | Goals | Apps | Goals | A yellow rectangle, denoting the yellow penalty card shown to a player being cautioned | A red rectangle, denoting the red penalty card shown to a player being sent off |
|---|---|---|---|---|---|---|---|---|---|---|---|---|---|
| 1 | GK | (Norway) | Egil Selvik | 40 | 0 | 0 | 0 | 1 | 0 | 41 | 0 | 3 | 0 |
| 2 | DF | (Democratic Republic of the Congo) | Jeremy Ngakia | 29+4 | 3 | 0 | 0 | 0+1 | 0 | 29+5 | 3 | 5 | 0 |
| 3 | DF | (Georgia (country)) | Saba Goglichidze | 11+1 | 0 | 0 | 0 | 0 | 0 | 11+1 | 0 | 2 | 0 |
| 4 | DF | (Cameroon) | Kévin Keben | 22+7 | 0 | 1 | 0 | 0+1 | 0 | 23+8 | 0 | 3 | 0 |
| 5 | MF | (Cyprus) | Hector Kyprianou | 22+3 | 0 | 0 | 0 | 1 | 0 | 23+3 | 0 | 8 | 0 |
| 6 | DF | (England) | Mattie Pollock | 31+3 | 1 | 1 | 0 | 0 | 0 | 32+3 | 1 | 6 | 0 |
| 7 | FW | (England) | Tom Ince | 10+17 | 4 | 0 | 0 | 1 | 0 | 11+17 | 4 | 0 | 0 |
| 8 | MF | (Georgia (country)) | Giorgi Chakvetadze | 22+7 | 0 | 0 | 0 | 0 | 0 | 22+7 | 0 | 6 | 0 |
| 9 | FW | (Denmark) | Luca Kjerrumgaard | 35+7 | 9 | 0 | 0 | 0+1 | 0 | 35+8 | 9 | 1 | 0 |
| 10 | MF | (Morocco) | Imran Louza | 41+1 | 7 | 1 | 0 | 0+1 | 0 | 42+2 | 7 | 10 | 1 |
| 11 | FW | (Republic of Ireland) | Rocco Vata | 6+6 | 2 | 0 | 0 | 0 | 0 | 6+6 | 2 | 0 | 0 |
| 12 | GK | (England) | Nathan Baxter | 6+1 | 0 | 1 | 0 | 0 | 0 | 7+1 | 0 | 0 | 0 |
| 14 | MF | (Belgium) | Pierre Dwomoh | 0+1 | 0 | 0 | 0 | 0 | 0 | 0+1 | 0 | 0 | 0 |
| 15 | MF | (Italy) | Edoardo Bove | 2+9 | 1 | 0 | 0 | 0 | 0 | 2+9 | 1 | 1 | 0 |
| 16 | DF | (England) | Marc Bola | 31+6 | 2 | 0+1 | 0 | 1 | 0 | 32+7 | 2 | 2 | 0 |
| 17 | MF | (France) | Pierre Ekwah | 3+4 | 0 | 0 | 0 | 0 | 0 | 3+4 | 0 | 1 | 0 |
| 18 | FW | (Portugal) | Vivaldo Semedo | 6+20 | 4 | 1 | 0 | 1 | 0 | 8+20 | 4 | 2 | 0 |
| 20 | FW | (Mali) | Mamadou Doumbia | 18+15 | 5 | 0 | 0 | 0 | 0 | 18+15 | 5 | 5 | 0 |
| 21 | DF | (England) | Stephen Mfuni | 8 | 0 | 0 | 0 | 0 | 0 | 8 | 0 | 2 | 0 |
| 23 | MF | (Senegal) | Nampalys Mendy | 17+8 | 0 | 1 | 0 | 0 | 0 | 18+8 | 0 | 2 | 0 |
| 24 | MF | (Nigeria) | Tom Dele-Bashiru | 0+1 | 0 | 0 | 0 | 1 | 0 | 1+1 | 0 | 0 | 0 |
| 25 | DF | (Republic of Ireland) | James Abankwah | 30+1 | 1 | 1 | 0 | 0 | 0 | 31+1 | 1 | 6 | 1 |
| 27 | DF | (Senegal) | Formose Mendy | 2+4 | 0 | 0 | 0 | 0 | 0 | 2+4 | 0 | 1 | 0 |
| 29 | DF | (Mauritania) | Jeremy Petris | 12+5 | 0 | 1 | 0 | 0 | 0 | 13+5 | 0 | 3 | 0 |
| 34 | FW | (Germany) | Kwadwo Baah | 6+20 | 1 | 0+1 | 0 | 0+1 | 1 | 6+22 | 1 | 4 | 0 |
| 39 | MF | (Democratic Republic of the Congo) | Edo Kayembe | 28+9 | 4 | 0 | 0 | 1 | 0 | 29+9 | 4 | 5 | 0 |
| 42 | FW | (Morocco) | Othmane Maamma | 21+4 | 4 | 0 | 0 | 0 | 0 | 21+4 | 4 | 1 | 0 |
| 43 | FW | (England) | Jack Grieves | 0+3 | 0 | 0+1 | 1 | 1 | 0 | 1+4 | 1 | 0 | 0 |
| 53 | MF | (Afghanistan) | Amin Nabizada | 0+3 | 0 | 0+0 | 0 | 0 | 0 | 0+3 | 0 | 0 | 0 |
| 64 | FW | (England) | Jonathan Lawson | 0+1 | 0 | 0 | 0 | 0 | 0 | 0+1 | 0 | 0 | 0 |
| 66 | FW | (Australia) | Nestory Irankunda | 22+18 | 4 | 1 | 0 | 1 | 0 | 24+18 | 4 | 9 | 1 |
Players who featured but departed the club during the season:
| 3 | DF | (England) | Max Alleyne | 14+2 | 0 | 0 | 0 | 1 | 0 | 15+2 | 0 | 2 | 0 |
| 17 | MF | (France) | Moussa Sissoko | 8+12 | 0 | 1 | 0 | 0 | 0 | 9+12 | 0 | 0 | 0 |
| 22 | DF | (England) | James Morris | 0+2 | 0 | 1 | 0 | 0 | 0 | 1+2 | 0 | 1 | 0 |
| 26 | DF | (United States) | Caleb Wiley | 3+2 | 0 | 0 | 0 | 0 | 0 | 3+2 | 0 | 0 | 0 |
| 45 | DF | (England) | Ryan Andrews | 0+3 | 0 | 0 | 0 | 1 | 0 | 1+3 | 0 | 1 | 0 |
