= Nestory Irankunda =

Australian soccer player (born 2006)

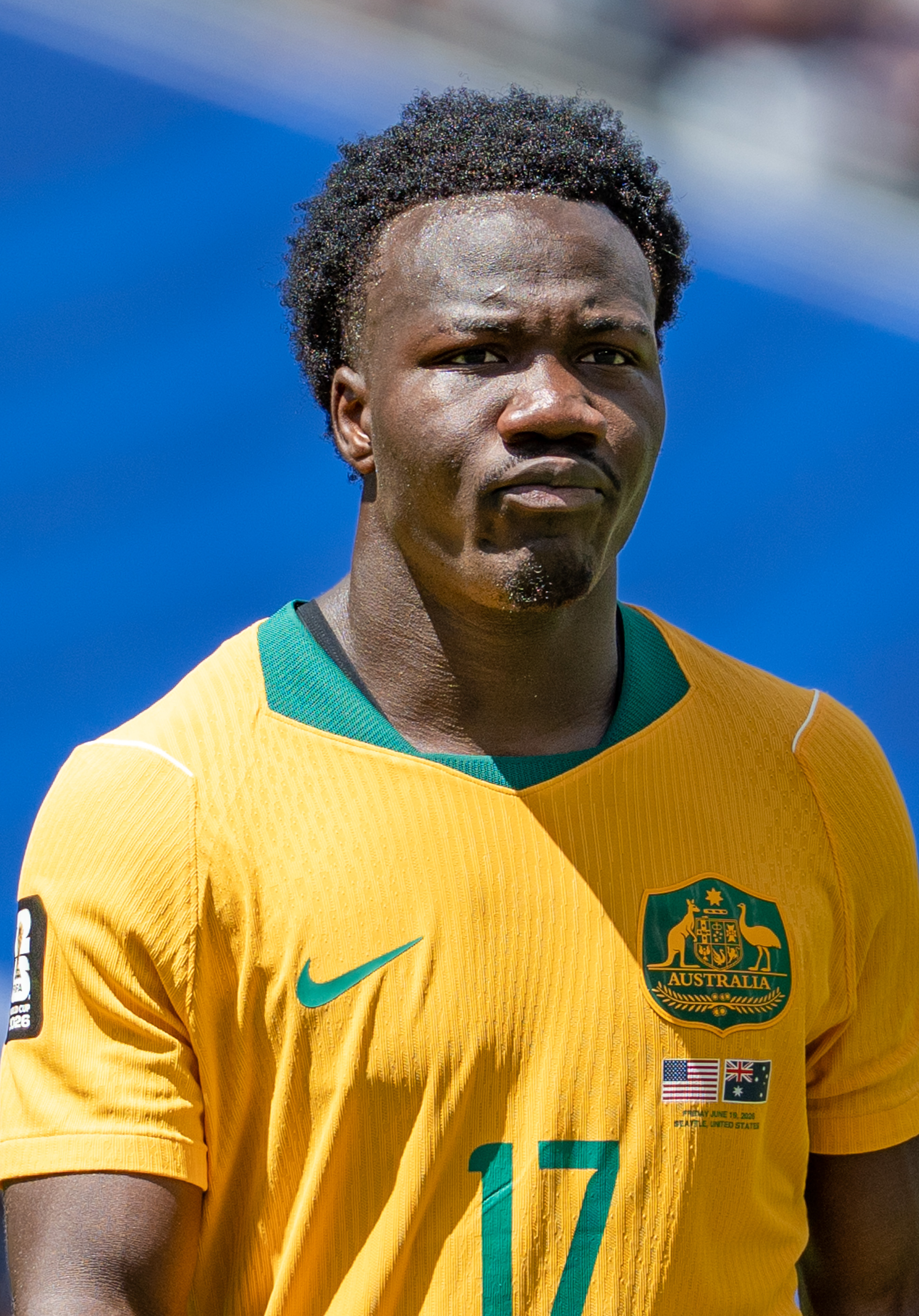
- Irankunda with Australia in 2026

Personal information
- Date of birth: 9 February 2006 (age 20)
- Place of birth: Kigoma, Tanzania
- Height: 1.75 m (5 ft 9 in) (Note: Varies between 1.74 and 1.76 by source. The Sydney Morning Herald gives 1.74, Eurosport and worldfootball.net 1.75, and Fox Sports 1.76.)
- Position: Winger

Team information
- Current team: Sporting CP
- Number: 19

Youth career
- 2015: Northern Wolves
- 2016–2017: Parafield Gardens
- 2018–2020: Adelaide Croatia Raiders
- 2021: Adelaide United

Senior career*
Years	Team	Apps	(Gls)
2021–2023	Adelaide United (NPL)	30	(6)
2022–2024	Adelaide United	60	(16)
2024	Bayern Munich II	15	(4)
2024–2025	Bayern Munich	0	(0)
2025	→ Grasshopper (loan)	19	(1)
2025–2026	Watford	40	(4)
2026–	Sporting CP	9	(0)

International career^{‡}
2022–2023	Australia U17	7	(11)
2024–	Australia	23	(8)
- * Club domestic league appearances and goals as of 21 November 2026 ‡ National team caps and goals as of 17 November 2026

Nestory Irankunda (/nɛstəriː ɪrəŋkʊndɑ/ NEST-ər-EE ir-əng-KUN-da; Kirundi: [iɾaŋkunda]; born 9 February 2006) is an Australian professional soccer player who plays as a winger for Primeira Liga club Sporting CP. Born in Tanzania to Burundian parents, he plays for the Australia national team. Known for his explosive pace and shot power, he is considered one of the greatest talents developed in Australia.

Raised in Adelaide, Irankunda played for various youth clubs in Australia before beginning his professional career at Adelaide United in the A-League. He broke numerous club and league records during his time at the club, being named the joint-2023–24 A-League Young Footballer of the Year with Alex Paulsen. In July 2024, Irankunda joined Bundesliga club Bayern Munich breaking the A-League transfer record, but would only feature in the club's reserve team for one season and went on loan to Swiss Super League club Grasshopper. The following two seasons, he moved to EFL Championship side Watford in July 2025 and Sporting CP in the Primeira Liga after the 2026 FIFA World Cup.

Irankunda featured for Australia in only the senior and under-17 teams. He earned call-ups to the under-20 and under-23 sides but didn't feature for either sides due to controversy and injuries. Irankunda is the youngest player to score in a World Cup for Australia, doing so in their opening group match of the 2026 World Cup, and the second youngest-ever to score for the national team in history.

== Early life and education ==
Irankunda was born on 9 February 2006 in a refugee camp in Kigoma to Gideon Rurandagaye and Dafroza Siyajali. His parents were born in Burundi, but fled from their home amid the civil war. His family escaped to a refugee camp in Tanzania where he was born. At three months old, his family moved to Perth and later to the northern suburbs of Adelaide when he was seven. His father first worked as a rideshare driver and later a pastor. Irankunda grew up in a Christian home, and found his love of football while playing with his older siblings. At the age of eight, he played for his first soccer club at Parafield Gardens after being brought in by the under-10s coach at the club.

Irankunda attended Karrendi Primary School and then Parafield Gardens High School. Although he claimed to do poorly at school, his favourite subject was English, and enjoys the Harry Potter books and film series. He came runner-up in his category in the School Sports Awards in December 2022. As a child, Irankunda's family faced financial hardship to support his career. His older brothers stopped their own soccer careers to help pay for his fees. During his junior years, when he played with Northern Wolves for a year in 2015, the club helped Irankunda by driving him to games, and subsidised his fees when his family could not afford them.

After his stints at Wolves and Parafield, he was scouted and signed by National Premier Leagues (NPL) side Adelaide Croatia Raiders. He caught the attention of many scouts in Adelaide including Airton Andrioli, the head of youth for A-League side Adelaide United. Andrioli signed him to a spot in the youth squad after only a few weeks of trials.

== Club career ==
=== Adelaide United ===
==== 2021–22: Development ====
In his first year for Adelaide United, Irankunda played in the reserve squad, and after a couple of weeks, started featuring for the senior squad. At the age of 15, he accumulated 26 appearances and 12 goals in total for both the senior and reserve squad in NPL South Australia. On 27 September 2021, he signed a scholarship contract and his first professional contract with Adelaide United. Irankunda made his first-team debut in a league match against rivals Melbourne Victory on 8 January 2022. He became the sixth youngest player in A-League history and third youngest at the time for Adelaide United to make his league debut.

On 30 January, Irankunda scored his first goal and the winner from a free kick in stoppage time in a 2–1 win against Newcastle Jets. He became the second youngest goal scorer in the league, aged 15 years and 355 days, after Mohamed Toure, who did so at the age of 15 years and 325 days. He scored his second goal and the winner in a 2–1 home win over Central Coast Mariners on 27 February, and his third on 24 April in a 2–0 win against Perth Glory. In the same month, he was awarded the Tomas Dale Medal for his sporting manner in the club. On 26 May, Irankunda was selected in the A-Leagues All Stars squad, alongside teammates Isaías Sánchez and Alexandar Popovic, to face Spanish club Barcelona.

==== 2022–23: Breakthrough season ====
In November 2022, Irankunda received a month suspension for disciplinary issues at the club and missed the opening round of the 2022–23 season. He scored his first goal of the season, the winning goal of a 2–1 home victory against Brisbane Roar on 4 February 2023. His goal received praise from manager Carl Veart. He also dedicated the goal to fellow teammate Juande, who broke his leg in the match against Melbourne City a week earlier. Irankunda furthered his reputation as a key player off the bench after scoring in three consecutive appearances for Adelaide United in the matches against Melbourne Victory (1–1), Melbourne City (4–2), and Newcastle Jets (4–2). He was awarded A-League Goal of the Month in February for his goal against Melbourne Victory.

It was during this season that Irankunda was criticised by the media for his behaviour in multiple incidents. In the match against Western Sydney Wanderers, he started a brawl that led to Wanderers' captain Marcelo getting sent-off for headlocking Irankunda after he provoked Calem Nieuwenhof. Another incident occurred on 23 April against Perth Glory when he received a booking for kicking the broadcaster’s pitchside microphone. In the same match against Perth, Irankunda scored his fifth goal of the season in the 99th minute of a 4–4 draw at the Perth Rectangular Stadium. The goal brought his A-League career total to eight goals, surpassing Mohamed Toure's record as the competition’s highest under-18 goalscorer. Irankunda was awarded the club's Rising Star accolade on 2 May. He featured off the bench in the semi-final of the finals series where his side lost 2–0 against the eventual winners Central Coast Mariners.

==== 2023–24: Final season with Adelaide United ====
During Adelaide's 2023–24 pre-season, Irankunda returned to Adelaide United Youth, where he scored the winner in the Young Reds' 4–3 elimination final victory against Adelaide Comets in August 2023. In the final minutes of the semi-final against Campbeltown City, he fell to the ground and had difficulty breathing after hitting his head in an attempt to make a pass. Dr Christian Verdicchio, the referee of the match, attended to him to ensure he was able to breathe. Irankunda was taken off the field and monitored before reporting to training the following day. As cautioned by the doctor, he missed the Round of 16 clash against Western Sydney Wanderers at Marconi Stadium, and subsequently, the semi final second leg against Campbelltown. Prior to his injury, Irankunda made one appearance for the first-team in the 2023 Australia Cup. After 35 substitute appearances, he made his starting debut on 20 October in a 3–0 victory against Central Coast Mariners.

Irankunda scored his first goal as a starter and for the season on 29 October from a free-kick in a 6–0 victory over Melbourne City. On 4 November, he was sent off in an Original Rivalry match against Melbourne Victory for a second booking. He missed the following league game against Sydney FC as a result. He was later awarded the October nomination for Young Footballer of the Year for his preceding performances. After the announcement of his move to Bayern, Irankunda returned from suspension on 26 November against Western United, managing one assist to Ben Halloran in a 3–1 win at Eureka Stadium, and later recorded two assists in his next three league matches.

After two substitute appearances, Irankunda eventually returned to the starting line-up on 4 January 2024, being named against Wellington Phoenix at home. Irankunda contributed towards two of Adelaide's goals, including an assist to Hiroshi Ibusuki, in a 2–2 draw by full-time. Ibusuki acted as a mentor for Irankunda during this season. The pair scored against Sydney FC in a 4–3 victory at Allianz Stadium on 14 January; Irankunda scored once and his second of the season, assisted by Ibusuki who scored a hat-trick. On 9 February, Irankunda made his 50th league appearance off the bench in a 3–3 draw against Perth Glory at home, becoming the youngest player, aged exactly 18, to reach this milestone and overtaking Liberato Cacace's record of 19 years, 5 months, 10 days old. In the post-match conference, Irankunda was criticised by Veart for not meeting to club standard, adding he hasn't "seen enough happiness from him." On 9 March, Irankunda scored his third goal of the campaign and the equaliser in a 2–1 home defeat to Melbourne Victory.

On 29 March, Irankunda scored his first professional hat-trick in a 4–1 home win over Western United. Aged 18 years and 49 days, he became the youngest player to score a hat-trick in the A-League Men and the second youngest to do so in Australian men's football history. On 8 April, in the following match, Irankunda provided two assists in a 4–2 comeback win against Perth Glory. He played his last match at home on 12 April, scoring a long-range goal, in a 2–1 defeat to Macarthur FC. He added a goal to his tally in a 3–3 draw against Western United on 16 April. In late-April, Irankunda was announced in the 2024 A-League Men All Stars squad that was set to play against Premier League club Newcastle United. Irankunda played his last match on 1 May for Adelaide United in a 2–0 away loss to Central Coast Mariners, allowing the Mariners to win the premiership title over runners-up Wellington Phoenix on the final matchday. Irankunda departed with 16 goals in 60 league appearance, in total, for Adelaide United. He was named the A-League Men Young Footballer of the Year, jointly with Alex Paulsen, at the end of the season.

=== Bayern Munich ===
On 14 November 2023, Adelaide United announced the sale of Irankunda to Bayern Munich for a club-record fee, with the forward set to join the club on 1 July 2024. Fabrizio Romano reported four days prior that Bayern Munich submitted an offer for Irankunda worth £3 million with add-ons. It has also been reported by other outlets that Bayern submitted an initial offer of €750,000 with a final payment potentially rising to over €3 million if agreed conditions are met.

Irankunda arrived at Bayern Campus on 18 June and trained with Bayern Munich II before preseason began in Waidring in three days. By July, he began training with the first-team. He was included in the squad that toured in Seoul, South Korea to play Tottenham Hotspur. After Irankunda earnt a call-up to the bench for a DFB Pokal match against SSV Ulm, manager Vincent Kompany praised him for his performances in pre-season. Before his loan move in January 2025, Irankunda made 19 appearances and five goals in all competitions for the second team in the Regionalliga Bayern and UEFA Youth League. He made his competitive debut on 19 July in a 1–0 league win over Wacker Burghausen, and was named man of the match when he scored his first competitive goal, netting a brace, in a 4–1 win against Würzburger Kickers on 24 August.

==== Loan to Grasshopper ====
On 4 January 2025, he joined Swiss Super League club Grasshopper on a six-month loan until 30 June. After three league appearances, Irankunda recorded three assists in the next four games in February and was awarded Player of the Month for February. He returned to Bayern with one goal in 21 appearances to his name during his loan. His lone goal came on 14 May against Yverdon, as, later that month, Grasshopper managed to avoid relegation after beating FC Aarau in the relegation play-off.

=== Watford ===
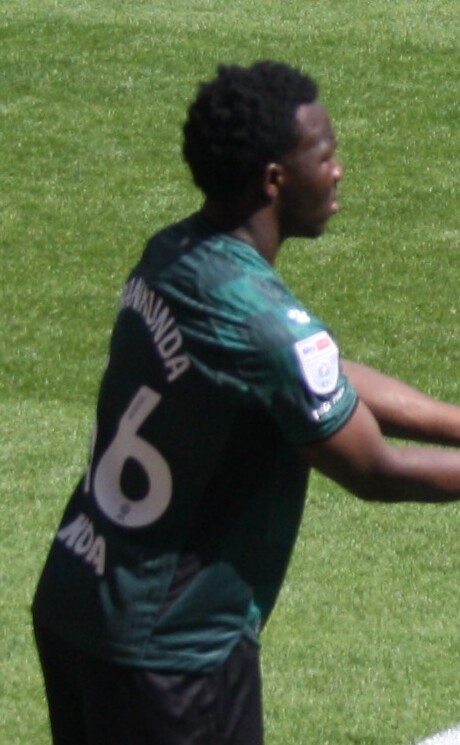
Irankunda with Watford in 2025

In July 2025, Irankunda signed a five-year contract with EFL Championship side Watford for an undisclosed fee. The transfer fee was reported to be around €3 million (A$5.3 million) with a 50% sell-on clause and a buy-back option from Bayern. He wore the squad number 66 shirt for the season. In his first five games, he managed three goal contributions after his debut against Charlton Athletic on 9 August 2025. He recorded an assist in his first league start against Queens Park Rangers on 16 August. In the next two league games, he scored a goal each, netting his first from a 25-yard free kick in a 1–1 draw to Swansea, and his second from another free kick in a 2–2 draw to Southampton.

By mid-season, Irankunda was demoted to an impact player off the bench for inconsistent performances under new manager Javi Gracia. He started to regain form when he recorded two assists in two appearances during the week of New Year in the matches against Norwich and Birmingham. On 31 January 2026, he was sent off for violent conduct against Swansea attacker Liam Cullen in the 2–0 defeat to the Swans. Irankunda later apologised for his actions and received a three-match suspension. Garcia resigned as manager after the match. In March, Irankunda recorded another two goal contributions in two appearances, with a goal against Stoke and an assist against Wrexham. At the end of the 2025–26 season, Irankunda managed four goals and five assists in 42 appearances for Watford and played the most minutes in a season of his career. The club finished 16th on the table.

=== Sporting CP ===
In August 2026, Irankunda signed a five-year contract with Primeira Liga club Sporting CP. The transfer fee was reportedly €16 million, with a further €2 million in potential add-ons, making it the most expensive transfer involving an Australian player, surpassing Lucas Herrington's transfer record after just four days.

Irankunda made his debut off the bench on 22 August in the third league match against Alverca. After three more appearances as a substitute, he made his first start for Sporting in a 2–2 draw to Arouca on 19 September. In his second consecutive start on 9 October, Irankunda recorded his first assist in a 3–1 away win over Braga. Four days later, he registered another assist in his UEFA Champions League debut in a 2–0 away win against Lens. By end of October, Irankunda became a regular starter for his side with two assists in ten appearances before head coach Rui Borges was sacked after his sixth start against Casa Pia on 30 October. Under Paulo Fonseca, Irankunda scored his first goal for the club and a brace in a 4–0 win over União da Serra in the Taça de Portugal on 21 November.

== International career ==
=== Youth ===
Eligible to represent Burundi, Tanzania, or Australia, Irankunda received his first international call-up in September 2022 to represent the Australian under-17 team in the 2023 AFC U17 Asian Cup qualifiers. He made his debut against the Northern Mariana Islands, netting a hat-trick by the 38th minute before scoring two more goals to complete a 23–0 win. He scored three more goals in the remaining group games, with one against Cambodia (10–0) and two against China (3–1). Australia topped the group to qualify for the U17 Asian Cup. On 16 May 2023, Irankunda was included in the squad that took part in the Asian Cup hosted in Thailand. On 19 June, in the second round of the group stage, Irankunda scored a brace in 18 minutes in a 5–3 win over China. Irankunda scored in the 3–1 defeat to Japan, as Australia ended their campaign in the knockout stage.

In April 2024, Irankunda was omitted from the Australia national under-23 team that was set to compete in the 2024 U23 Asian Cup. Head coach Tony Vidmar stated his absence was in concern over his maturity and to prevent "further damage" from pressure. However, after Marco Tilio sustained an injury, Irankunda was given a spot but declined the offer to play his remaining club fixtures for Adelaide United. Keegan Jelacic was called up in place of Tilio. Due to the timing of his response, and complaints from two A-League clubs, Football Australia conducted an investigation of Irankunda with a means to suspend him from domestic competitions for the duration of the Asian Cup. Irankunda was cleared for club selection since he was not formally called-up by Vidmar, or held no apparent conversation with Football Australia. After the tournament, Football Australia led another review of Irankunda's omission in their season report, after the Olyroos failed to qualify out of the group stage without scoring a single goal.

On 22 May 2025, Irankunda was called up to the Australian under-20 team for two friendlies against Argentina as part of preparations for the 2025 FIFA U20 World Cup. He withdrew from the squad on 1 June due to injury.

=== Senior ===
On 14 March 2023, Irankunda received his first international call-up as a "train on" player for Australia, who was set to play two friendly matches against Ecuador. He was included in both match squads to replace Riley McGree, who was ruled out with an illness before his travel to Sydney. He did not feature in either match, and would have broken Duncan Cummings' record as the youngest player to appear for the Socceroos if he had. During his time at the camp, he became a mentee under fellow Socceroo Awer Mabil.

In November, the Burundi Football Association announced their interest in Irankunda to represent their national team. In May 2024, Irankunda stated, he would consider playing for either Burundi or Tanzania if Graham Arnold continues to exclude him in future tournaments. On 29 May, days after his comments, Irankunda was called-up to the Australian national team ahead of the 2026 World Cup qualification matches in June against Bangladesh and Palestine. Arnold expressed that he was surprised by Irankunda's consideration to play for other national teams but praised his maturity following his omission in the Olyroos squad. After the first training session in Dhaka, Arnold said the issue was resolved.

Irankunda started on his international debut on 6 June, providing an assist for the opening goal in a 2–0 win against Bangladesh. Five days later, he scored his first goal for Australia from a penalty in a 5–0 victory against Palestine. At 18 years and 123 days of age, he became the second youngest player to score for Australia.

On 31 May 2026, Irankunda was selected in the 26-man squad for the 2026 FIFA World Cup. He scored Australia's first goal of the tournament, and was named player of the match, in their opening group game against Turkey on 13 June 2026, which Australia won 2–0. The goal made him the youngest-ever goal scorer for Australia at a World Cup, aged at 20 years and 125 days.

== Player profile ==
=== Style of play ===
Irankunda is widely regarded as one of the greatest talents from Australia. He is known for his explosive pace, shot power and technique, and his threat from set pieces. His ability to draw fouls from opponents has received praise from media. In an interview, Irankunda said he models his playing style after Lionel Messi for his agility and power. The biomechanics behind his shot power comes down to compact and efficient movements, a stable support leg and a “rigid” striking foot. Unlike the average soccer player, Irankunda does not need a large backswing which makes it difficult for goalkeepers to read the trajectory of his shots, especially from set pieces. His shot power and technique has been compared to the likes of Cristiano Ronaldo and Roberto Carlos.

In his breakthrough season in Adelaide, Irankunda faced many restriction of minutes on the pitch, having made most of his appearances off the bench, a decision made by head coach Veart to protect and ensure that he developed properly. Deployed on the either wing, Irankunda utilises his pace and dribbling to stretch the field wide and disrupt the opposition's tactics, effectively in the later stages of matches against fatigued opponents. He typically takes the ball inside, using his dribbling to maneuver past opponents and create opportunities to shoot on goal or cross towards the centre. Irankunda is known for his shot power on goal and often opts to shoot rather than pass when inside the goal area. However, after gaining regular playing time in the 2023–24 season, Irankunda played a more creative and mature role which used his pace, dribbling and weaker foot to cut inside and lay off striking opportunities for forwards more frequently. In a 4–3–3 formation, he would rotate between either wing of the field or directly in the centre to create goal-scoring opportunities.

=== Reception ===
Irankunda is considered one of the best Australian youth prospects and is a prominent figure of South Australian football, being named by Messenger Newspapers as "one of the top 20 South Australian athletes to watch in 2023," and listed on 5 January 2024 by The Advertiser as "one of the 24 South Australians to watch in 2024". On 11 October 2023, Irankunda was named as one of the 60 best young talents in world football by The Guardian, being the only Australian listed. In March 2024, Irankunda was ranked among the best 50 young talents born after January 2005 in the annual NXGN lists from GOAL. L'Équipe also listed Irankunda in a similar category list of 30 players in June. Irankunda was ranked by CIES Football Observatory as one of the top 100 Under-20 players worldwide in 2025. Irankunda has also been compared to Alphonso Davies for their similar journey in football; Davies was born in a refugee camp in Ghana before residing in Canada.

As one of the youngest members of Adelaide United's squad at the time, Irankunda was criticised for his "emotional outbursts" and lack of maturity on the football pitch, which gained attention from his send-off in the match against Melbourne Victory in November 2023. Veart stated that he was working on his frustrations and emotions. This was also addressed by Bayern Munich in an interview. Irankunda developed a more mature approach towards the later stages of the 2023–24 season. Veart praised him for "making good strides" in his maturity. This was supported by his mentor, Mabil, in June 2026.

=== Goal celebrations ===
Irankunda has adopted a wide range of goal celebrations throughout his career so far. His signature celebration has been the acrobatic backflip since the start of his career. As a long-time fan of American singer Michael Jackson, he adopted his dance moves into his celebrations. He performed Jackson's crotch grab with the silver glove when he scored a brace against Curaçao on 31 March 2026, and a dance routine inspired by the artist in a video to announce his signing with Sporting CP in August. When he scored the opening goal for Australia in their win against Turkey in the 2026 FIFA World Cup, he performed the signature celebration from Tim Cahill with his shadowboxing to the corner flag. He did so to commemorate Cahill, who he described was his "biggest inspiration".

== Personal life ==
Irankunda has six siblings and is the third youngest in his family. He has two older sisters, Gideon Sikujuwa and Susana Hamenyimana, and two older brothers, Grabriel and Jotham. He also has two younger sisters, Blessing and Mary. Susana is a football player with Playford City. Outside of his family, Irankunda is close friends with fellow football player Mohamed Touré. Irankunda met Touré during a school tournament in Adelaide before the pair became teammates at Adelaide United. He also played football with Touré and his brothers, who resided in Croydon, at a local park.

Irankunda attended Karrendi Primary School and subsequently Parafield Gardens High School, both located in Parafield Gardens, a northern suburb of Adelaide. His attendance at both schools was confirmed by the South Australian Department for Education in June 2026. When his family resided in Perth, he attended Grovelands Primary School in the suburb of Armadale.

Irankunda supported La Liga club Barcelona and idolised club legends Carles Puyol and Gerard Piqué as a child, who influenced him to play centre-back before his coaches swapped him into a more attacking role. Despite his support for Barcelona, his father's long-time support for Bayern Munich influenced his decision to sign for the German club. In an interview in June 2023, Irankunda expressed his desire to retire with Adelaide United by the end of his career.

== Career statistics ==
=== Club ===
As of match played 21 November 2026

Appearances and goals by club, season and competition
Club	Season	League			National cup (Note: Includes Australia Cup and FA Cup)		League cup (Note: Includes EFL Cup)		Continental		Total	
Club	Season	Division	Apps	Goals	Apps	Goals	Apps	Goals	Apps	Goals	Apps	Goals
Adelaide United Youth	2021	NPL SA	15	3	—		—		—		15	3
Adelaide United Youth	2022	NPL SA	12	1	—		—		—		12	1
Adelaide United Youth	2023	NPL SA	3 (Note: Includes two appearances and two goals in the finals series)	2	—		—		—		3	2
Adelaide United Youth	Total		30	6	—		—		—		30	6
Adelaide United	2021–22	A-League Men	13 (Note: Includes two appearances in the finals series)	3	0	0	—		—		13	3
Adelaide United	2022–23	A-League Men	22 (Note: Includes three appearances in the finals series)	5	0	0	—		—		22	5
Adelaide United	2023–24	A-League Men	25	8	1	0	—		—		26	8
Adelaide United	Total		60	16	1	0	—		—		61	16
Bayern Munich II	2024–25	Regionalliga Bayern	15	4	—		—		—		15	4
Grasshopper (loan)	2024–25	Swiss Super League	21 (Note: Includes two appearances in the relegation play-off)	1	—		—		—		21	1
Watford	2025–26	Championship	40	4	1	0	1	0	—		42	4
Sporting CP	2026–27	Primeira Liga	9	0	1	2	0	0	2 (Note: Appearances in UEFA Champions League)	0	12	2
Career total			175	31	3	2	1	0	2	0	181	33

=== International ===
As of match played 13 November 2026

Appearances and goals by year
National team	Year	Apps	Goals
Australia	2024	5	1
Australia	2025	6	2
Australia	2026	12	5
Total		23	8

Scores and results list Australia's goal tally first, score column indicates score after each Irankunda goal.

List of international goals scored by Nestory Irankunda
No.	Date	Venue	Cap	Opponent	Score	Result	Competition
1	11 June 2024	Perth Rectangular Stadium, Perth, Australia	2	Palestine	5–0	5–0	2026 FIFA World Cup qualification
2	9 September 2025	Mount Smart Stadium, Auckland, New Zealand	7	New Zealand	2–0	3–1	2025 Soccer Ashes
3	10 October 2025	Saputo Stadium, Montreal, Canada	8	Canada	1–0	1–0	Friendly
4	31 March 2026	Melbourne Rectangular Stadium, Melbourne, Australia	13	Curaçao	4–1	5–1	2026 FIFA Series
5	31 March 2026	Melbourne Rectangular Stadium, Melbourne, Australia	13	Curaçao	5–1	5–1	2026 FIFA Series
6	13 June 2026	BC Place, Vancouver, Canada	16	Turkey	1–0	2–0	2026 FIFA World Cup
7	25 September 2026	Queensland Country Bank Stadium, Townsville, Australia	20	Brazil	1–0	1–1	Friendly
8	13 November 2026	Abdullah bin Khalifa Stadium, Doha, Qatar	22	Qatar	3–0	3–0	Friendly

== Honours ==
Australia

- FIFA Series (Australia): 2026
- Soccer Ashes: 2025

Individual

- 2026 FIFA Series (Australia): Player of the Tournament
- A-League Men Young Footballer of the Year: 2023–24
- A-League All Stars: 2022
