= Othmane Maamma =

Footballer (born 2005)

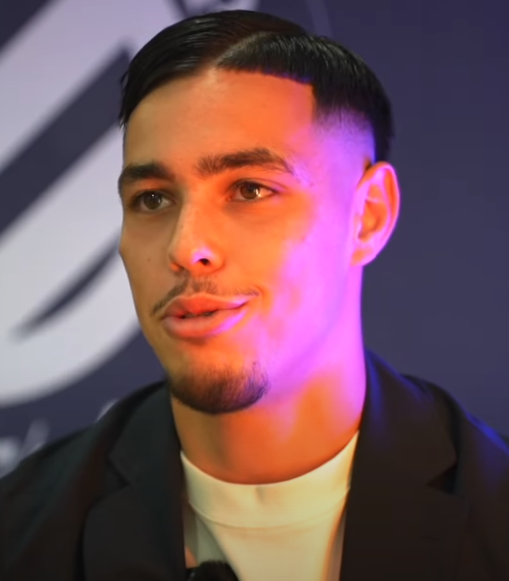
- Maamma in 2024

Personal information
- Full name: Othmane Maamma
- Date of birth: 6 October 2005 (age 21)
- Place of birth: Alès, France
- Height: 1.80 m (5 ft 11 in)
- Position: Winger

Team information
- Current team: Watford
- Number: 42

Youth career
- Gazelec Sportif Gardois
- –2016: Arles
- 2016–2022: Montpellier

Senior career*
Years	Team	Apps	(Gls)
2022–2025	Montpellier B	28	(8)
2024–2025	Montpellier	14	(2)
2025–	Watford	37	(4)

International career^{‡}
2024–2025	Morocco U20	28	(5)
2026–	Morocco	1	(0)
Medal record
Men's football
Representing Morocco
FIFA U-20 World Cup
Winner	2025 Chile
U-20 Africa Cup of Nations
Runner-up	2025 Egypt
- * Club domestic league appearances and goals as of 23:59, 31 October 2026 (UTC) ‡ National team caps and goals as of 21:08, 10 October 2026 (UTC)

Othmane Maamma (born 6 October 2005) is a professional footballer who plays as a forward for EFL Championship club Watford. Born in France, he represents the Morocco national team.

== Club career ==
On 12 May 2024, Maamma made his professional debut for Ligue 1 club Montpellier, coming on as a substitute in a 2–0 defeat at home to Monaco. He completed five dribbles and two shots on target, a performance that "impressed observers". In the following match on 19 May, he made his first senior start and scored his first professional goal in a 2–2 draw away to Lens. At the age of 18 years and 226 days, he became the third-youngest goalscorer in Montpellier's history. On 11 July 2025, Maamma joined Championship side Watford on a four-year deal for an undisclosed fee.

== International career ==
In March 2024, Maamma was called up by the Morocco under-20s for two friendly matches against the England under-19s and the United States under-19s. He played in the match against England.

In October 2025, Maamma participated in the FIFA U-20 World Cup, where he helped Morocco under-20s to win the tournament by becoming the top assist provider with four, also scoring one goal. This led to Maamma winning the Golden Ball for player of the tournament.

== Career statistics ==
=== Club ===
As of match played 31 October 2026

Appearances and goals by club, season and competition
Club	Season	League			National cup (Note: Includes Coupe de France)		League cup (Note: Includes EFL Cup)		Other		Total	
Club	Season	Division	Apps	Goals	Apps	Goals	Apps	Goals	Apps	Goals	Apps	Goals
Montpellier B	2022–23	National 3	8	2	—		—		—		8	2
Montpellier B	2023–24	National 3	18	5	—		—		—		18	5
Montpellier B	2024–25	National 3	2	1	—		—		—		2	1
Montpellier B	Total		28	8	—		—		—		28	8
Montpellier	2023–24	Ligue 1	2	1	0	0	—		—		2	1
Montpellier	2024–25	Ligue 1	12	1	0	0	—		—		12	1
Montpellier	Total		14	2	0	0	—		—		14	2
Watford	2025–26	Championship	25	4	0	0	—		—		25	4
Watford	2026–27	Championship	12	0	0	0	2	0	0	0	14	0
Watford	Total		37	4	0	0	2	0	0	0	39	4
Career total			79	14	0	0	2	0	0	0	81	14

=== International ===
As of match played 26 May 2026

Appearances and goals by national team and year
National team	Year	Apps	Goals
Morocco
Morocco	2026	1	0
Total		1	0

== Honours ==
Morocco U20

- FIFA U-20 World Cup: 2025

Individual

- FIFA U-20 World Cup Golden Ball: 2025
- CAF Youth Player of the Year: 2025
- PFA Championship Fans' Player of the Month: December 2025
- Watford Young Player of the Season: 2025–26
