= 2024 Australia national soccer team season =

- Season: 2024
- Manager: Graham Arnold (until 20 September); Tony Popovic (from 23 September)
- Captain: Mathew Ryan
- Top goalscorer: Kusini Yengi (6)
- Most caps: Jackson Irvine (16)
- Players: 45
- Goalscorers: 15
- Debutants: 9
- Biggest home win: Australia 5–0 Palestine (11 June)
- Biggest away win: Lebanon 0–5 Australia (26 March)
- Highest scoring: Lebanon 0–5 Australia (26 March); Australia 5–0 Palestine (11 June)
- Longest winning run: 4 (21 March – 11 June)
- Longest unbeaten run: 5 (6–28 January; 10 September–19 November)
- Longest winless run: 3 (15 October–19 November)
- Longest losing run: 1 (2 February; 5 September)
- Highest attendance: 46,291; Australia 3–1 China (5 September)
- Lowest attendance: 18,261; Australia 5–0 Palestine (11 June)
- Average attendance: 29,056
Home colours	Away colours

This page summarises the Australia men's national soccer team fixtures and results in 2024.

== Summary ==
Australia started the year with a friendly against Bahrain in Abu Dhabi in preparation ahead of the 2023 Asian Cup taking place in Qatar. Australia won the match 2–0 thanks to an own goal by Amine Binaddi and a goal by Mitchell Duke. Welsh youth international Gethin Jones made his debut for Australia, having been born in Perth.

Australia opened their Asian Cup campaign against India, beating them 2–0 with Jackson Irvine scoring first and later Jordan Bos being subbed on and scoring his first international goal. In the second match they beat Syria 1–0 thanks to another goal by Irvine, guaranteeing advancement to the knockout stage. In the final game, Australia drew with Uzbekistan 1–1 to finish top of their group. Martin Boyle gave them the lead after converting a controversial penalty kick at the end of the first half and Azizbek Turgunboev equalised for Uzbekistan in the second half. As the top team of group B, Australia were set to face one of the third-placed teams, with their identity only being confirmed at the end of the last group stage matches, as Oman were eliminated from the tournament and Indonesia took the spot in the round of 16 match against Australia. While it seemed Australia would scrape through their first knockout match, they ended up beating Indonesia 4–0 to book a quarter-final spot with the first goal scored following a shot by Irvine being deflected off Elkan Baggott into goal and awarded as an own goal. The first half ended with Boyle scoring the second goal with a header. In the second half, Craig Goodwin and Harry Souttar added a goal each to set the final score. A couple of days later, their quarter-final opponent was confirmed when South Korea beat Saudi Arabia in a penalty shoot-out after equalising in second-half stoppage time. Australia lost the quarter-final match to South Korea 1–2. Despite leading for most of the match following Goodwin's first-half goal, South Korea equalised in a second consecutive match during the second-half stoppage time, with Hwang Hee-chan scoring a penalty kick. In extra time, their captain Son Heung-min scored a free kick to give South Korea the victory.

Having won the first two of their 2026 World Cup qualifiers in the previous year, Australia resumed the campaign, hosting Lebanon at CommBank Stadium. Australia won the match 2–0 with Keanu Baccus and Kye Rowles scoring their first international goals. German-based John Iredale made his debut for the senior international side, coming on as a substitute in place of Duke. The away leg against Lebanon was played in Canberra, following AFC approval, due to the Gaza war. Australia won the match 5–0 thanks to a brace by Goodwin, an own goal by Bassel Jradi, and maiden international goals for Kusini Yengi and Iredale. Two youngsters, Patrick Yazbek and Josh Nisbet, made their international debut.

In June, coach Graham Arnold selected a squad for the last two qualifiers of the group. After not playing for the Australia's senior squad and not being selected for the past few underage squads, Nestory Irankunda mentioned in a press conference that he's considering representing Tanzania or Burundi. Following this he was selected for the squad, though sources at Football Australia claimed he was chosen before his announcement. The away leg against Bangladesh was played at Bashundhara Kings Arena in Dhaka. Australia won the match 2–0 thanks to goals by Ajdin Hrustic and Yengi. Irankunda made his senior international debut in the match and assisted the first goal. In their last qualifying match of the group, Australia beat Palestine 5–0 to record a perfect 6 wins out of 6 games and top the group. In the match, Yengi scored a brace and Adam Taggart, Boyle, and Irankunda scored a goal each with the latter's goal being his first senior international goal.

The third round of qualification for the 2026 World Cup started in September with a home match against Bahrain on the Gold Coast, which Australia lost 1–0 due to an own goal by Souttar after Yengi was sent-off with a red card in the 77th minute. Five days later, they travelled to Jakarta, where they were held to a scoreless draw by Indonesia. Following these two matches, Arnold decided to step down from the head coach role, claiming it was "time for a change." A few days later, Football Australia announced Tony Popovic as the new head coach.

Popovic's tenure seemed to be getting off to a bad start when Australia hosted China and Xie Wenneng gave the visitors the lead. However, Australia rallied with Lewis Miller scoring his first goal just before the half-time break. In the second half, Goodwin gave Australia the lead and Nishan Velupillay scored on his international debut to seal the scoreline 3–1. In the second game, played in Saitama, Australia managed to draw 1–1 with Japan with Shogo Taniguchi's own goal being the first they conceded in nine matches. Unfortunately an own goal by Cameron Burgess levelled the scores. In the game, Luke Brattan made his first senior international appearance, making him the oldest debutant for the Socceroos.

The following month, Australia hosted Saudi Arabia at AAMI Park in a match which ended in a scoreless draw, despite the visitors seemingly scoring in injury time, only for the goal to be overruled as offside. The match saw Anthony Caceres make his international debut. In the final match of the year, Australia played an away game against Bahrain, with the match ending in a 2–2 draw with Yengi scoring a brace - the first within 38 seconds and the second one 6 minutes into injury time. Bahrain's Mahdi Abduljabbar scored a brace within 2 minutes. The match saw Hayden Matthews start the game to record his international debut.

== Record ==
As of match played 19 November 2024

Type	GP	W	D	L	GF	GA
Friendly	1	1	0	0	2	0
Asian Cup	5	3	1	1	9	3
World Cup qualifiers	10	5	4	1	20	5
Total	16	9	5	2	31	8

== Match results ==
=== Friendlies ===
6 January	Bahrain	0–2	Australia	Abu Dhabi, United Arab Emirates
18:00 UTC+4		Report	Binaddi 36' (o.g.); Duke 61'	Stadium: Baniyas Stadium; Referee: Mohamed Al-Harmoodi (United Arab Emirates)

=== Asian Cup ===
13 January Group stage	Australia	2–0	India	Al Rayyan, Qatar
14:30 UTC+3	Irvine 50'; Bos 73'	Report		Stadium: Ahmad bin Ali Stadium; Attendance: 35,253; Referee: Yoshimi Yamashita (Japan)

18 January Group stage	Syria	0–1	Australia	Doha, Qatar
14:30 UTC+3		Report	Irvine 59'	Stadium: Jassim bin Hamad Stadium; Attendance: 10,097; Referee: Adel Al-Naqbi (United Arab Emirates)

22 January Group stage	Australia	1–1	Uzbekistan	Doha, Qatar
14:30 UTC+3	Boyle 45+1' (pen.)	Report	Turgunboev 78'	Stadium: Abdullah bin Khalifa Stadium; Attendance: 15,290; Referee: Yusuke Araki (Japan)

28 January Round of 16	Australia	4–0	Indonesia	Al Rayyan, Qatar
14:30 UTC+3	Baggott 12' (o.g.); Boyle 45'; Goodwin 89'; Souttar 90+1'	Report		Stadium: Jassim bin Hamad Stadium; Attendance: 7,863; Referee: Mohammed Abdulla Hassan Mohamed (United Arab Emirates)

2 February Quarter-finals	Australia	1–2 (a.e.t.)	South Korea	Doha, Qatar
18:30 UTC+3	Goodwin 42'	Report	H.C. Hwang 90+6' (pen.); Son 104'	Stadium: Al Janoub Stadium; Attendance: 39,632; Referee: Ahmed Al-Kaf (Oman)

=== World Cup qualifiers ===
21 March Second round	Australia	2–0	Lebanon	Sydney, Australia
20:10 UTC+11	Baccus 5'; Rowles 54'	Report		Stadium: CommBank Stadium; Attendance: 27,026; Referee: Khamis Al-Marri (Qatar)

26 March Second round	Lebanon	0–5	Australia	Canberra, Australia (Note: Lebanon will play this home match in Australia, following AFC approval, due to the ongoing Gaza war.)
19:45 UTC+11		Report	Yengi 2'; Jradi 47' (o.g.); Goodwin 48', 81'; Iredale 68'	Stadium: Canberra Stadium; Attendance: 25,023; Referee: Mooud Bonyadifard (Iran)

6 June Second round	Bangladesh	0–2	Australia	Dhaka, Bangladesh
16:45 UTC+6		Report	Hrustic 29'; Yengi 62'	Stadium: Bashundhara Kings Arena; Attendance: 5,227; Referee: Jansen Foo (Singapore)

11 June Second round	Australia	5–0	Palestine	Perth, Australia
20:05 UTC+8	Yengi 5' (pen.), 41'; Taggart 26'; Boyle 53'; Irankunda 87' (pen.)	Report		Stadium: HBF Park; Attendance: 18,261; Referee: Khalid Al-Turais (Saudi Arabia)

5 September Third round	Australia	0–1	Bahrain	Gold Coast, Australia
20:00 UTC+10		Report	Souttar 89' (o.g.)	Stadium: Robina Stadium; Referee: Omar Al-Ali (United Arab Emirates)

10 September Third round	Indonesia	0–0	Australia	Jakarta, Indonesia
19:00 UTC+7		Report		Stadium: Gelora Bung Karno Stadium; Attendance: 70,059; Referee: Salman Ahmad Falahi (Qatar)

10 October Third round	Australia	3–1	China	Adelaide, Australia
19:40 UTC+10:30	Miller 45+2'; Goodwin 53'; Velupillay 90+2'	Report	Xie 20'	Stadium: Adelaide Oval; Attendance: 46,291; Referee: Nazmi Nasaruddin (Malaysia)

15 October Third round	Japan	1–1	Australia	Saitama, Japan
19:35 UTC+9	Burgess 76' (o.g.)	Report	Taniguchi 58' (o.g.)	Stadium: Saitama Stadium 2002; Referee: Ahmed Al-Ali (Kuwait)

14 November Third round	Australia	0–0	Saudi Arabia	Melbourne, Australia
20:10 UTC+11		Report		Stadium: Melbourne Rectangular Stadium; Attendance: 27,491; Referee: Adel Ali Ahmed Khamis Al-Naqbi (United Arab Emirates)

19 November Third round	Bahrain	2–2	Australia	Riffa, Bahrain
18:15 UTC+3	Abduljabbar 75', 77'	Report	Yengi 1', 90+6'	Stadium: Bahrain National Stadium; Referee: Ko Hyung-jin (South Korea)

== Player statistics ==
Correct as of 19 November 2024 (v. Bahrain).
Numbers are listed by player's number in last match played

No.	Pos	Nat	Player	Total		Friendlies		Asian Cup		World Cup qualifiers	
No.	Pos	Nat	Player	Apps	Goals	Apps	Goals	Apps	Goals	Apps	Goals
1	GK	(Australia) AUS	Mathew Ryan	10	0	0+0	0	5+0	0	5+0	0
12	GK	(Australia) AUS	Paul Izzo	0	0	0+0	0	0+0	0	0+0	0
12	GK	(Australia) AUS	Lawrence Thomas	0	0	0+0	0	0+0	0	0+0	0
12	GK	(Australia) AUS	Tom Glover	0	0	0+0	0	0+0	0	0+0	0
18	GK	(Australia) AUS	Joe Gauci	6	0	1+0	0	0+0	0	5+0	0
2	DF	(Australia) AUS	Thomas Deng	2	0	0+0	0	0+0	0	1+1	0
2	DF	(Australia) AUS	Gethin Jones	6	0	1+0	0	3+0	0	2+0	0
2	DF	(Australia) AUS	Miloš Degenek	0	0	0+0	0	0+0	0	0+0	0
3	DF	(Australia) AUS	Nathaniel Atkinson	5	0	0+1	0	2+1	0	1+0	0
3	DF	(Australia) AUS	Ryan Strain	1	0	0+0	0	0+0	0	1+0	0
3	DF	(Australia) AUS	Lewis Miller	6	1	0+0	0	0+2	0	4+0	1
4	DF	(Australia) AUS	Kye Rowles	11	1	0+1	0	4+0	0	5+1	1
4	DF	(Australia) AUS	Rhyan Grant	0	0	0+0	0	0+0	0	0+0	0
5	DF	(Australia) AUS	Jordan Bos	13	1	1+0	0	3+2	1	3+4	0
8	DF	(Australia) AUS	Jason Geria	4	0	0+0	0	0+0	0	2+2	0
13	DF	(Australia) AUS	Alessandro Circati	3	0	0+0	0	0+0	0	3+0	0
16	DF	(Australia) AUS	Aziz Behich	14	0	0+1	0	5+0	0	5+3	0
17	DF	(Australia) AUS	Joel King	0	0	0+0	0	0+0	0	0+0	0
17	DF	(Australia) AUS	Hayden Matthews	1	0	0+0	0	0+0	0	1+0	0
19	DF	(Australia) AUS	Harry Souttar	15	1	1+0	0	5+0	1	9+0	0
21	DF	(Australia) AUS	Cameron Burgess	10	0	1+0	0	1+1	0	7+0	0
7	MF	(Australia) AUS	Anthony Caceres	2	0	0+0	0	0+0	0	1+1	0
8	MF	(Australia) AUS	Connor Metcalfe	11	0	1+0	0	3+2	0	4+1	0
10	MF	(Australia) AUS	Ajdin Hrustic	7	1	0+0	0	0+0	0	4+3	1
11	MF	(Australia) AUS	Josh Nisbet	3	0	0+0	0	0+0	0	0+3	0
13	MF	(Australia) AUS	Aiden O'Neill	10	0	1+0	0	1+4	0	3+1	0
14	MF	(Australia) AUS	Riley McGree	11	0	0+1	0	2+3	0	4+1	0
14	MF	(Australia) AUS	Cameron Devlin	2	0	0+0	0	0+0	0	0+2	0
17	MF	(Australia) AUS	Keanu Baccus	9	1	0+0	0	4+1	0	3+1	1
17	MF	(Australia) AUS	Patrick Yazbek	2	0	0+0	0	0+0	0	0+2	0
20	MF	(Australia) AUS	Luke Brattan	1	0	0+0	0	0+0	0	1+0	0
20	MF	(Australia) AUS	Max Balard	0	0	0+0	0	0+0	0	0+0	0
22	MF	(Australia) AUS	Jackson Irvine	16	2	1+0	0	5+0	2	10+0	0
4	FW	(Australia) AUS	Apostolos Stamatelopoulos	1	0	0+0	0	0+0	0	0+1	0
6	FW	(Australia) AUS	Martin Boyle	7	3	0+0	0	5+0	2	2+0	1
7	FW	(Australia) AUS	Samuel Silvera	5	0	1+0	0	0+2	0	1+1	0
7	FW	(Australia) AUS	Mathew Leckie	1	0	0+0	0	0+0	0	1+0	0
7	FW	(Australia) AUS	Nishan Velupillay	3	1	0+0	0	0+0	0	0+3	1
8	FW	(Australia) AUS	John Iredale	2	1	0+0	0	0+0	0	0+2	1
9	FW	(Australia) AUS	Bruno Fornaroli	5	0	0+0	0	1+4	0	0+0	0
9	FW	(Australia) AUS	Adam Taggart	4	1	0+0	0	0+0	0	2+2	1
9	FW	(Australia) AUS	Kusini Yengi	10	6	0+1	0	1+1	0	6+1	6
10	FW	(Australia) AUS	Awer Mabil	2	0	0+0	0	0+0	0	0+2	0
11	FW	(Australia) AUS	Marco Tilio	2	0	0+1	0	0+1	0	0+0	0
11	FW	(Australia) AUS	Nestory Irankunda	5	1	0+0	0	0+0	0	3+2	1
11	FW	(Australia) AUS	Brandon Borrello	2	0	0+0	0	0+0	0	0+2	0
15	FW	(Australia) AUS	Mitchell Duke	13	1	1+0	1	3+1	0	6+2	0
17	FW	(Australia) AUS	Daniel Arzani	1	0	0+0	0	0+0	0	0+1	0
23	FW	(Australia) AUS	Craig Goodwin	10	5	1+0	0	2+1	2	5+1	3
