= Vivaldo Semedo =

Portuguese footballer (born 2005)

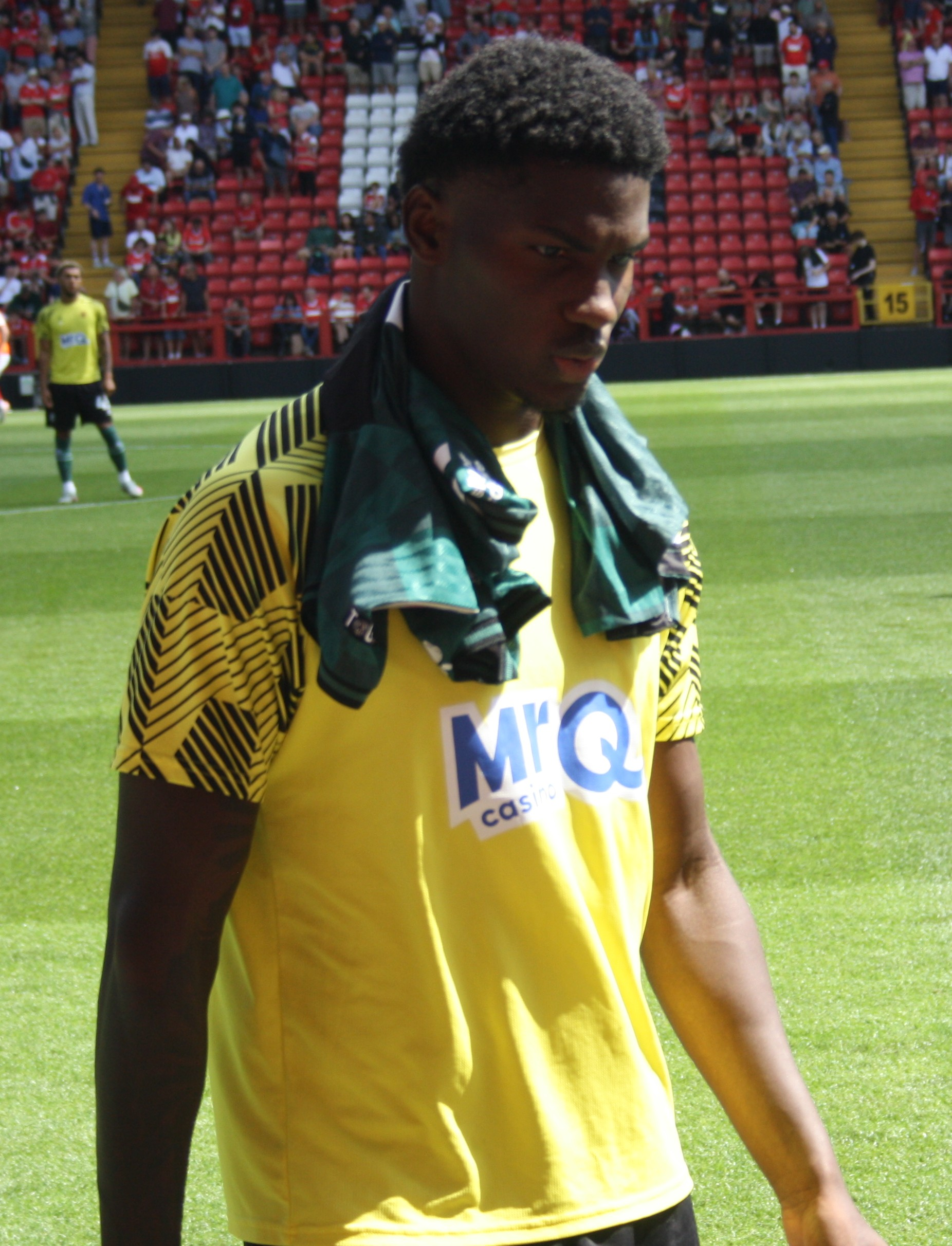
- Semedo with Watford in 2025

Personal information
- Full name: Vivaldo Leandro Semedo Moura De Sousa
- Date of birth: 28 January 2005 (age 21)
- Place of birth: Luanda, Angola
- Height: 1.92 m (6 ft 4 in)
- Position: Forward

Team information
- Current team: Alverca (on loan from Watford)
- Number: 9

Youth career
- 2016–2018: Povoense
- 2018–2022: Sporting CP
- 2022–2023: Udinese

Senior career*
Years	Team	Apps	(Gls)
2023–2025	Udinese	6	(0)
2024	→ Volendam (loan)	13	(1)
2024–2025	→ Vizela (loan)	25	(9)
2025–	Watford	26	(4)
2026–	→ Alverca (loan)	4	(2)

International career^{‡}
2022	Portugal U17	4	(0)
2022–2024	Portugal U18	12	(3)
2023–2024	Portugal U19	4	(2)
2024–2026	Portugal U20	8	(1)
2025–	Portugal U21	2	(1)
- * Club domestic league appearances and goals as of 29 August 2026 ‡ National team caps and goals as of 30 March 2026

Vivaldo Leandro Semedo Moura De Sousa (born 28 January 2005) is a professional footballer who plays as a forward for Primeira Liga club Alverca, on loan from EFL Championship club Watford. Born in Angola, he is a youth international for Portugal.

== Club career ==
=== Sporting CP ===
Semedo is a youth product of Povoense, and joined the youth academy of Sporting CP in 2018. On 6 May 2021, he signed his first professional contract with Sporting. In his final season with the Sporting U17s, he scored 23 goals in 24 games.

=== Udinese ===
On 25 August 2022, he transferred to Udinese signing a three-year contract. He made his professional and senior debut with Udinese as a late substitute in a 1–1 tie with Hellas Verona on 30 January 2023.

On 24 January 2024, Udinese sent Semedo on loan to Eredivisie club Volendam until the end of the 2023–24 season. He made his debut for the club on 28 January 2024, in a 1–0 defeat to Fortuna Sittard. He scored his first goal for the club on 1 March 2024, in a 5–2 defeat to NEC Nijmegen.

On 2 September 2024, Semedo was loaned to Vizela for the 2024–25 season.

=== Watford ===
On 5 July 2025, Semedo joined Championship side Watford on a five-year contract for an undisclosed fee. He made his debut for the club on 12 August 2025, in a 2–1 defeat to Norwich City in the EFL Cup. He scored his first goal for the club on 27 September 2025, in a 2–1 win against Hull City.

On 16 July 2026, Semedo joined Primeira Liga side Alverca on a season-long loan. He made his debut for the club on 9 August 2026, in a 2–0 defeat to Porto. He scored his first goal for the club on 15 August 2026, in a 2–2 draw with Estrela da Amadora.

== International career ==
Semedo was born in Angola, and moved to Portugal at a young age. He is a youth international for Portugal, having started with the Portugal U17s.

== Career statistics ==
As of match played 29 August 2026

Appearances and goals by club, season and competition
Club	Season	League			National cup (Note: Includes Coppa Italia, KNVB Cup, Taça de Portugal, FA Cup)		League cup (Note: Includes Taça da Liga, EFL Cup)		Other		Total	
Club	Season	Division	Apps	Goals	Apps	Goals	Apps	Goals	Apps	Goals	Apps	Goals
Udinese	2022–23	Serie A	5	0	0	0	—		—		5	0
Udinese	2023–24	Serie A	1	0	0	0	—		—		1	0
Udinese	2024–25	Serie A	0	0	0	0	—		—		0	0
Udinese	Total		6	0	0	0	0	0	0	0	6	0
Volendam (loan)	2023–24	Eredivisie	13	1	0	0	—		—		13	1
Vizela (loan)	2024–25	Liga Portugal 2	25	9	0	0	0	0	2 (Note: Appearances in 2024–25 Primeira Liga Promotion/Relegation play-off)	0	27	9
Watford	2025–26	Championship	26	4	1	0	1	0	—		28	4
Watford	2026–27	Championship	0	0	0	0	0	0	—		0	0
Watford	Total		26	4	1	0	1	0	0	0	28	4
Alverca (loan)	2026–27	Primeira Liga	4	2	0	0	0	0	—		4	2
Career total			74	16	1	0	1	0	2	0	78	16
