= A-League Men Young Footballer of the Year =

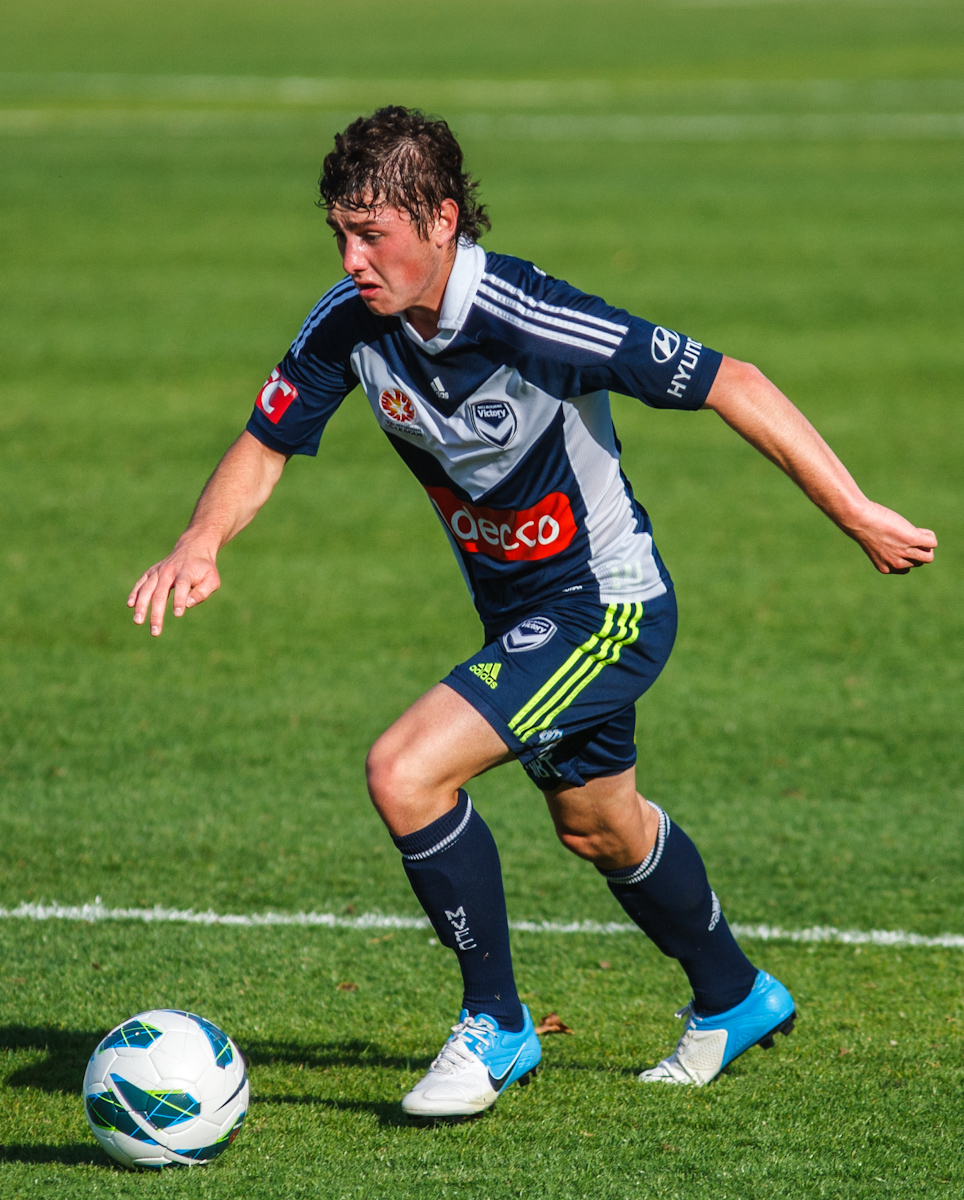
Marco Rojas is the only player to win the award while winning the Johnny Warren Medal in the same season.

The A-League Men Young Footballer of the Year is an annual association football award given to the player aged 23 or under at the start of the season who has been judged to have had the best season of any young player in the A-League Men. It is currently called the NAB Young Footballer of the Year for sponsorship purposes. The award has been presented since the 2005–06 season and the winner is chosen by a panel of experts and media representatives. In 2014, the age for eligibility was lifted from 21 to 23. The first winner of the award was Perth Glory midfielder Nick Ward.

As of 2017, Mathew Ryan and Jamie Maclaren are the only players to have won the award on more than one occasion. Marco Rojas and Alex Paulsen are the only non-Australian winners of the trophy. Players aged 23 or under at the start of the season remain eligible to win the Johnny Warren Medal, and in 2013 Rojas won both awards.

Since 2009, one player has been awarded a nomination for the award each month of the season, with the eventual winner then selected from the nominees.

In 2024, the award was awarded to two players for the first time, with Nestory Irankunda and Paulsen tying.

== Winners ==
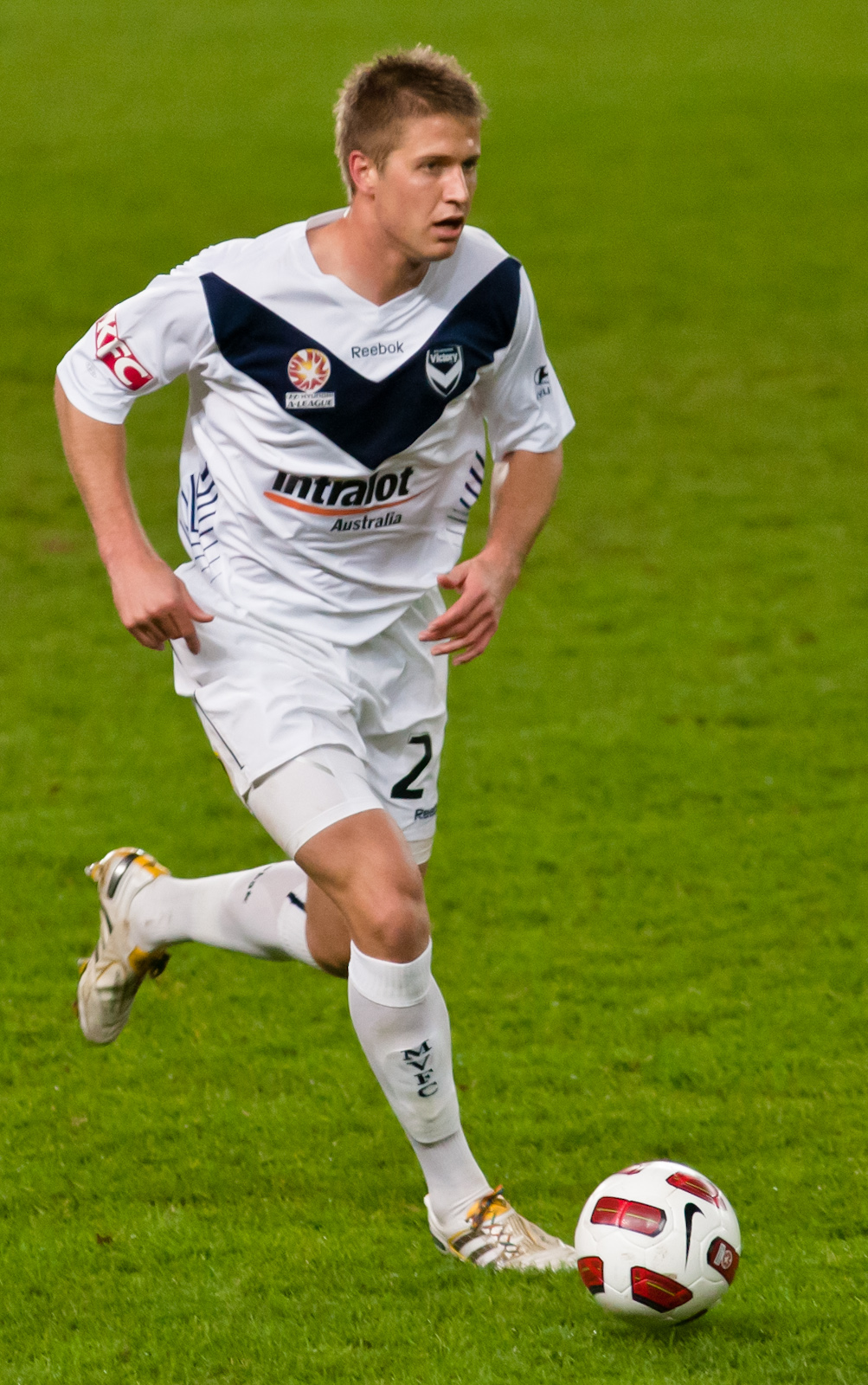
Adrian Leijer was the second-ever recipient of the award.

The award has been presented on 21 occasions as of 2026, with 20 different winners.

Key
| Player (X) | Name of the player and number of times they had won the award at that point (if more than one) |
| § | Denotes the club were A-League premiers in the same season |

A-League Young Footballer of the Year winners
| Season | Player | Nationality | Club | Ref(s) |
|---|---|---|---|---|
| 2005–06 | Nick Ward | Australia | Perth Glory | |
| 2006–07 | Adrian Leijer | Australia | Melbourne Victory^{§} | |
| 2007–08 | Bruce Djite | Australia | Adelaide United | |
| 2008–09 | Scott Jamieson | Australia | Adelaide United | |
| 2009–10 | Tommy Oar | Australia | Brisbane Roar | |
| 2010–11 | Mathew Ryan | Australia | Central Coast Mariners | |
| 2011–12 | Mathew Ryan (2) | Australia | Central Coast Mariners^{§} | |
| 2012–13 | Marco Rojas | New Zealand | Melbourne Victory | |
| 2013–14 | Adam Taggart | Australia | Newcastle Jets | |
| 2014–15 | James Jeggo | Australia | Adelaide United | |
| 2015–16 | Jamie Maclaren | Australia | Brisbane Roar | |
| 2016–17 | Jamie Maclaren (2) | Australia | Brisbane Roar | |
| 2017–18 | Daniel Arzani | Australia | Melbourne City | |
| 2018–19 | Chris Ikonomidis | Australia | Perth Glory^{§} | |
| 2019–20 | Riley McGree | Australia | Adelaide United | |
| 2020–21 | Joel King | Australia | Sydney FC | |
| 2021–22 | Angus Thurgate | Australia | Newcastle Jets | |
| 2022–23 | Jordan Bos | Australia | Melbourne City^{§} | |
| 2023–24 | Nestory Irankunda; Alex Paulsen | Australia; New Zealand | Adelaide United; Wellington Phoenix | |
| 2024–25 | Archie Goodwin | Australia | Adelaide United | |
| 2025–26 | Eli Adams | Australia | Newcastle Jets^{§} | |

== Breakdown of winners ==
=== By nationality ===
| Country | Total |
|---|---|
| Australia | 20 |
| New Zealand | 2 |

=== By club ===
| Club | Total |
|---|---|
| Adelaide United | 6 |
| Brisbane Roar | 3 |
| Newcastle Jets | 3 |
| Central Coast Mariners | 2 |
| Melbourne City | 2 |
| Melbourne Victory | 2 |
| Perth Glory | 2 |
| Sydney FC | 1 |
| Wellington Phoenix | 1 |

== See also ==
- Johnny Warren Medal
- A-League Golden Boot
