= Imrân Louza =

Footballer (born 1999)

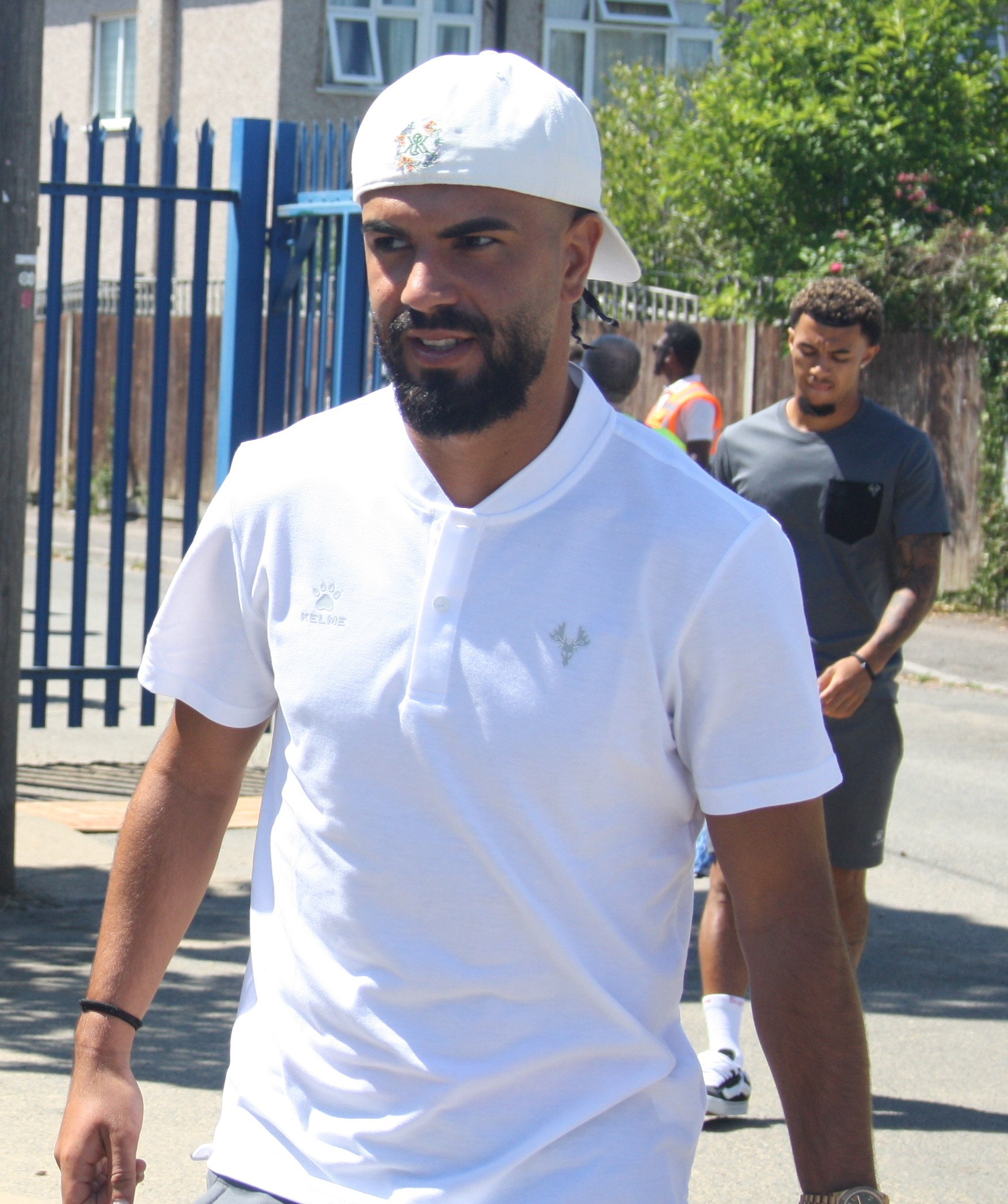
- Louza with Watford in 2025

Personal information
- Full name: Imrân Louza
- Date of birth: 1 May 1999 (age 27)
- Place of birth: Nantes, France
- Height: 1.78 m (5 ft 10 in)
- Position: Midfielder

Team information
- Current team: Panathinaikos
- Number: 26

Youth career
- 2005–2006: Etoile du Cens
- 2006–2017: Nantes

Senior career*
Years	Team	Apps	(Gls)
2017–2019	Nantes B	40	(10)
2019–2021	Nantes	58	(9)
2021–2026	Watford	131	(15)
2024	→ Lorient (loan)	14	(1)
2026–	Panathinaikos	10	(1)

International career^{‡}
2017	Morocco U20	2	(1)
2019	France U20	2	(0)
2019	France U21	6	(0)
2021–	Morocco	15	(2)
- * Club domestic league appearances and goals as of 14 November 2026 ‡ National team caps and goals as of 26 May 2026

Imrân Louza (Arabic: عمران لوزة; born 1 May 1999) is a professional footballer who plays as a midfielder for Super League Greece club Panathinaikos. Born in France, he represented the Morocco national team.

Louza came through Nantes' youth academy and made his first team debut in 2019, and his international debut in 2021.

== Club career ==
=== Nantes ===
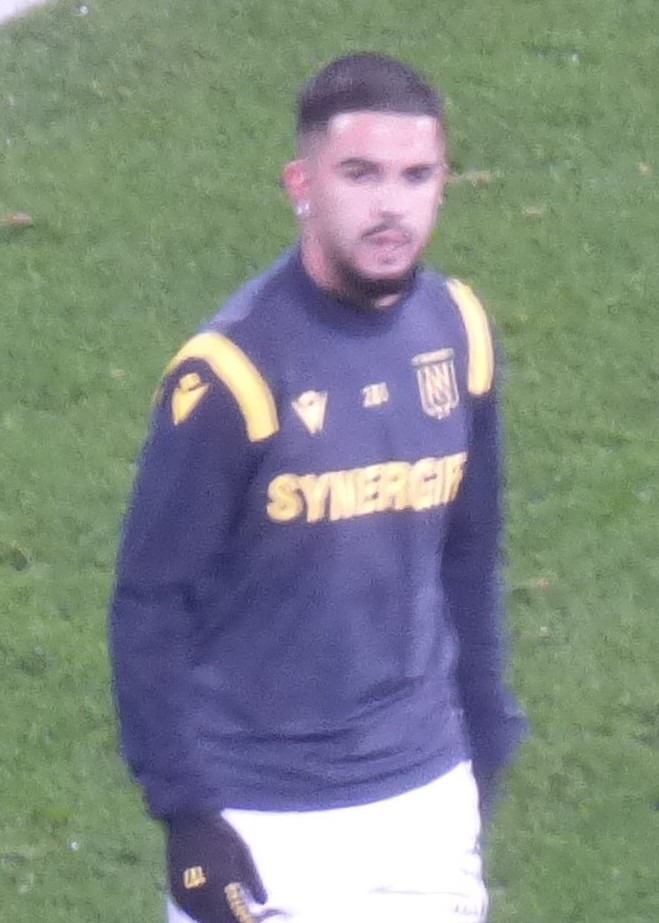
Louza with Nantes in 2020.

Louza joined the youth academy of Nantes in 2006 from Etoile du Cens, and was captain of several youth categories in the club. He made his professional debut with Nantes in a 4–1 Coupe de France win over Châteauroux on 4 January 2019, and scored in his debut.

=== Watford ===
On 1 June 2021, Watford completed the signing of Louza from Nantes for a reported fee of €10 million. He signed with The Hornets on a five-year deal lasting until 2026. On 21 August 2021, Louza made his debut for Watford in a 2–0 loss against Brighton.

On 8 October 2022, in Louza's third appearance of the season, he opened his account for Watford with an impressive free-kick to equalise in an eventual 3–1 defeat to Blackpool. On 19 October 2022, Louza was stretchered off during a 3–0 defeat to Millwall. Manager Slaven Bilić would go on to reveal that Louza had fractured his fibula as well as suffering ligament damage, an injury that would rule him out for several months and see him miss the 2022 FIFA World Cup.

In January 2024, Louza joined Ligue 1 club Lorient on loan until the end of the season, the deal containing a purchase option.

=== Panathinaikos ===
On 28 August 2026, Louza signed for Super League Greece club Panathinaikos for a fee of around £7 million.

== International career ==
Louza was born in France to a Moroccan father and a French mother. He represented the Morocco U20s in a 3–2 friendly win over the France U20s, and scored a goal for his side. He switched to represent France internationally, debuting for the France U20s and U21s.

Louza formally decided to represent the senior Morocco national team and debuted and scored in a 5–0 2022 FIFA World Cup qualification win over Guinea-Bissau on 6 October 2021.

== Career statistics ==
=== Club ===
As of match played 2 May 2026

Appearances and goals by club, season and competition
Club	Season	League			National cup (Note: Includes Coupe de France, FA Cup)		League cup (Note: Includes Coupe de la Ligue, EFL Cup)		Other		Total	
Club	Season	Division	Apps	Goals	Apps	Goals	Apps	Goals	Apps	Goals	Apps	Goals
Nantes B	2017–18	Championnat National 3	20	4	—		—		—		20	4
Nantes B	2018–19	Championnat National 2	20	6	—		—		—		20	6
Nantes B	Total		40	10	—		—		—		40	10
Nantes	2018–19	Ligue 1	1	0	2	1	0	0	—		3	1
Nantes	2019–20	Ligue 1	24	2	2	1	2	1	—		28	2
Nantes	2020–21	Ligue 1	33	7	1	0	—		2 (Note: Appearances in Ligue 1 relegation play-offs)	0	36	7
Nantes	Total		58	9	5	2	2	1	2	0	67	12
Watford	2021–22	Premier League	20	0	2	0	—		—		22	0
Watford	2022–23	Championship	21	5	0	0	—		—		21	5
Watford	2023–24	Championship	15	1	1	0	1	0	—		17	1
Watford	2024–25	Championship	33	2	1	0	3	0	—		37	2
Watford	2025–26	Championship	42	7	1	0	1	0	—		44	7
Watford	Total		131	15	5	0	5	0	—		141	15
Lorient (loan)	2023–24	Ligue 1	14	1	—		—		—		14	1
Panathinaikos	2026–27	Super League Greece	0	0	0	0	—		0	0	0	0
Career total			243	35	10	2	7	1	2	0	262	37

=== International ===
Scores and results list Morocco's goal tally first, score column indicates score after each Louza goal.

List of international goals scored by Imran Louza
No.	Date	Venue	Opponent	Score	Result	Competition
1	6 October 2021	Prince Moulay Abdellah Stadium, Rabat, Morocco	Guinea-Bissau	2–0	5–0	2022 FIFA World Cup qualification
2	12 November 2021	Prince Moulay Abdellah Stadium, Rabat, Morocco	Sudan	3–0	3–0	2022 FIFA World Cup qualification
