= Nikoloz Chikovani =

Georgian footballer (born 2007)

Personal information
- Date of birth: 21 June 2007 (age 19)
- Place of birth: Georgia
- Height: 1.88 m (6 ft 2 in)
- Position: Winger

Team information
- Current team: Watford
- Number: 19

Youth career
- –2024: Dinamo Tbilisi
- 2025–: Watford

Senior career*
Years	Team	Apps	(Gls)
2024–2025	Dinamo-2 Tbilisi	11	(0)
2025	FC Dinamo Tbilisi	9	(1)
2025–	Watford	0	(0)
2025	→ Royal Charleroi (loan)	1	(0)
2025	→ Zebra Elites (loan)	5	(0)

International career^{‡}
2023–2024	Georgia U17	13	(2)
2024–	Georgia U19	16	(3)
- * Club domestic league appearances and goals as of 26 December 2025 ‡ National team caps and goals as of 18 November 2025

Nikoloz Chikovani (Georgian: ნიკოლოზ ჩიქოვანი; born 21 June 2007) is a Georgian professional footballer who plays as a winger for Watford.

== Early life ==
Chikovani was born on 21 June 2007. Born in Georgia, he started playing football at the age of four.

== Club career ==
As a youth player, Chikovani joined the youth academy of Georgian side FC Dinamo Tbilisi at the age of thirteen and was promoted to the club's senior team ahead of the 2025 season, where he made nine league appearances and scored one goal. Belgian news website Walfoot.be wrote in 2025 that he was "considered a great talent in his country".

Following his stint there, he signed for English side Watford FC in 2025. The same year, he was sent on loan to Belgian side Royal Charleroi SC, where he made one league appearance and scored zero goals.

== International career ==
Chikovani is a Georgia youth international. During November 2025, he played for the Georgia national under-19 football team for 2026 UEFA European Under-19 Championship qualification.
