= Luigi Gaspar =

English footballer (born 2004)

Personal information
- Date of birth: 11 March 2004 (age 22)
- Place of birth: London, England
- Position: Midfielder

Team information
- Current team: Portimonense (U23)

Youth career
- Years: Team
- 2011–2019: Corinthians
- 2019–2022: Arsenal
- 2022–2025: Watford
- 2025–: Portimonense

Luigi Adamo Gaspar (born 11 March 2004) is an English footballer who plays as a midfielder for the Under-23 squad of Portuguese club Portimonense.

== Club career ==
Gaspar began his career with the same club as his father, Corinthians, joining at under-7 level, and initially representing the club in futsal. He progressed through the academy, notably scoring in a friendly match against adults organised by Emerson Sheik in 2017, at the age of thirteen. He signed a training contract with the club the following year.

In July 2019 Gaspar joined the academy of English Premier League side Arsenal, after his father's appointment as club technical director. Following three years with the club, Gaspar departed Arsenal by mutual consent. He joined fellow English side Watford in July 2022. At the end of the 2022–23 season, Watford exercised their one-year option on Gaspar, keeping him with the club until 2024.
