= Crotch grab =

Crotch grab may refer to:

- A dance move known to have been performed by Michael Jackson and others
- A taunting gesture (in Italy a gesture with ancient roots)

== See also ==
- Groin attack, a deliberate strike to the groin area
- Handjob, manual stimulation of the penis
- Fingering (sexual act)
- Groping
