= 2026 Australia national soccer team season =

- Season: 2026
- Manager: Tony Popovic
- Captain: Mathew Ryan
- Top goalscorer: Nestory Irankunda (4)
- Players: 26
- Goalscorers: 6
- Debutants: 5
- Biggest home win: Australia 5–1 Curaçao (31 March)
- Highest scoring: Australia 5–1 Curaçao (31 March)
- Longest winning run: 2 (27–31 March)
- Longest unbeaten run: 3 (25 June – 25 September)
- Longest winless run: 5 (19 June – 29 September)
- Longest losing run: 1 (30 May, 19 June, 29 September)
- Highest attendance: 52,423; Australia 2–4 Brazil (29 September)
- Lowest attendance: 16,764; Australia 5–1 Curaçao (31 March)
- Average attendance: 29,606

This page summarises the Australia men's national soccer team fixtures and results in 2026.

== Summary ==
Australia began their 2026 campaign in March as hosts of a FIFA Series mini-tournament. They secured a 1–0 victory over Cameroon at Stadium Australia with a late goal from Jordan Bos. Four days later, they defeated Curaçao 5–1 in Melbourne, featuring a second-half brace from 20-year-old Nestory Irankunda, a first-ever international goal from Alessandro Circati, as well as a goal by Awer Mabil and another goal by Bos.

Australia played Mexico at the Rose Bowl in Pasadena, California on 30 May, in a match that was part of the pre-tournament training camp and which was planned to help in the selection process. They lost the match 0–1, with Mexican defender Johan Vásquez scoring the only goal in the game with a first-half header. Following the match, Tony Popovic named his World Cup squad with a few surprises including uncapped Tete Yengi and Cristian Volpato who switched allegiance from Italy at the last moment. In their final friendly ahead of the World Cup, Australia drew 1–1 with Switzerland at Snapdragon Stadium on 6 June. Dan Ndoye opened the scoring for Switzerland, while Yengi scored on debut for Australia, with Volpato also making his debut.

Australia opened Group D of the 2026 World Cup with a match against Turkey in Vancouver. They won the match 2–0, with Irankunda and Connor Metcalfe scoring the goals and Patrick Beach was surprisingly selected to start as goalkeeper and kept a clean sheet with some great saves. The result was considered one of Australia's best World Cup victories. In the second group match against the United States, Australia lost 0–2 with Cameron Burgess scoring an own goal and Alex Freeman scoring a header. In their final group match against Paraguay, Australia were capable of advancing from the second place with at least a draw. They drew the match in Santa Clara 0–0 and advanced to the knockout stage, where they will face Group G's second-placed team. After the group's final match, it was confirmed that Australia would meet Egypt in the round of 32. The match ended 1–1 after extra time, with Emam Ashour scoring for Egypt and Australia equalising following an own goal by Mohamed Hany. Australia were eliminated from the tournament via the subsequent penalty shoot-out, which Egypt won 4–2 after Popovic gambled by replacing Beach with veteran goalkeeper Mathew Ryan in the last minute and selecting centre-backs Harry Souttar and Lucas Herrington to take penalty kicks, with both of them missing.

Australia's first match following the World Cup was a friendly against Brazil, hosted in Townsville. The final result was 1–1, with a magnificent free kick by Irankunda cancelled by a last minute header by Rayan. Towards the end of the match, Marcus Younis was substituted on, making his Socceroos debut. In another friendly against Brazil in Brisbane, Australia lost 2–4 in front of a record 52,423 crowd. Circati and Metcalfe scored for Australia while Vanderson, Raphinha, Bruno Guimarães, and Vinícius scored for Brazil.

In September, Football Australia scheduled friendly matches in the Middle East against Qatar and Jordan, to be played in November. However, after almost the entire squad refused to travel to Jordan, due to security concerns, the second match was relocated to Doha, Qatar. Australia won the match against Qatar 3–0, with Riley McGree, T. Yengi, and Irankunda scoring in the first half allowing Popovic to sub on debutants Eli Adams, Sam Klein, Kasey Bos, and Diesel Herrington who replaced his brother Lucas. A few days later, Australia lost the match against Jordan 0–2, with Musa Al-Taamari and Ali Olwan scoring and the Socceroos only managing one shot on target.

== Record ==
As of match played 17 November 2026

Type	GP	W	D	L	GF	GA
2026 FIFA Series	2	2	0	0	6	1
Friendly	6	1	2	3	7	9
2026 FIFA World Cup	4	1	2	1	3	3
Total	12	4	4	4	16	13

== Match results ==
=== 2026 FIFA Series ===
27 March	Australia	1–0	Cameroon	Sydney, Australia
20:10 UTC+10:00	Bos 85'	Report		Stadium: Stadium Australia; Attendance: 23,798; Referee: Robert Jones (England)

31 March	Australia	5–1	Curaçao	Melbourne, Australia
20:10 UTC+10:00	Mabil 23'; Circati 68'; Bos 71'; Irankunda 80', 84'	Report	Martha 50'	Stadium: AAMI Park; Attendance: 16,764; Referee: Andrew Madley (England)

=== Friendlies ===
30 May	Mexico	1–0	Australia	Pasadena, United States
18:00 UTC−7	Vásquez 27'	Report		Stadium: Rose Bowl; Attendance: 78,479; Referee: Rubiel Vásquez (United States)

6 June	Australia	1–1	Switzerland	San Diego, United States
12:00 UTC−7	Yengi 56'	Report	Ndoye 14'	Stadium: Snapdragon Stadium; Attendance: 6,107; Referee: Katja Koroleva (United States)

25 September	Australia	1–1	Brazil	Townsville, Australia
20:00 UTC+10	Irankunda 68'	Report	Rayan 90+4'	Stadium: Queensland Country Bank Stadium; Attendance: 25,440; Referee: Ryo Tanimoto (Japan)

29 September	Australia	2–4	Brazil	Brisbane, Australia
20:00 UTC+10	Circati 30'; Metcalfe 34'	Report	Vanderson 3'; Raphinha 45+1' (pen.); Guimarães 70'; Vinícius 80' (pen.)	Stadium: Suncorp Stadium; Attendance: 52,423; Referee: Yusuke Araki (Japan)

13 November	Qatar	0–3	Australia	Doha, Qatar
17:45 UTC+3		Report	McGree 5'; T. Yengi 32'; Irankunda 40'	Stadium: Abdullah bin Khalifa Stadium; Referee: Yahya Al-Mulla (United Arab Emirates)

17 November	Jordan	2–0	Australia	Doha, Qatar (Note: On 12 November, the Jordan Football Association and Football Australia announced that the match would be relocated from Amman, Jordan to Doha, Qatar due to "security concerns.")
--:-- UTC+3	Al-Taamari 34'; Olwan 90+3'	Report		Stadium: Suheim bin Hamad Stadium; Referee: Saud Al-Samhan (Kuwait)

=== 2026 FIFA World Cup ===
13 June Group stage	Australia	2–0	Turkey	Vancouver, Canada
21:00 (UTC-7)	Irankunda 27'; Metcalfe 75'	Report		Stadium: BC Place; Attendance: 52,497; Referee: Jesús Valenzuela (Venezuela)

19 June Group stage	United States	2–0	Australia	Seattle, United States
12:00 (UTC-7)	Burgess 11' (o.g.); Freeman 43'	Report		Stadium: Lumen Field; Attendance: 66,925; Referee: Felix Zwayer (Germany)

25 June Group stage	Paraguay	0–0	Australia	Santa Clara, United States
19:00 (UTC-7)		Report		Stadium: Levi's Stadium; Attendance: 68,827; Referee: Clément Turpin (France)

3 July Round of 32	Australia	1–1 (a.e.t.) (2–4 p)	Egypt	Arlington, United States
13:00 UTC−5	Hany 55' (o.g.)	Report	Ashour 13'	Stadium: AT&T Stadium; Attendance: 70,244; Referee: Gustavo Tejera (Uruguay)
	Penalties
	Souttar (penalty missed); Irvine (penalty scored); Mabil (penalty scored); Herrington (penalty missed)		(penalty scored) Saber; (penalty scored) Rabia; (penalty scored) Salah; (penalty scored) Abdelmaguid

== Player statistics ==
Correct as of 17 November 2026 (v. Jordan).
Numbers are listed by player's number in last match played

No.	Pos	Nat	Player	Total		FIFA Series		Friendlies		World Cup	
No.	Pos	Nat	Player	Apps	Goals	Apps	Goals	Apps	Goals	Apps	Goals
1	GK	(Australia) AUS	Mathew Ryan	4	0	2+0	0	1+0	0	0+1	0
1	GK	(Australia) AUS	Jacob Chapman	0	0	0+0	0	0+0	0	0+0	0
1	GK	(Australia) AUS	Tom Glover	0	0	0+0	0	0+0	0	0+0	0
12	GK	(Australia) AUS	Paul Izzo	0	0	0+0	0	0+0	0	0+0	0
12	GK	(Australia) AUS	Joe Gauci	0	0	0+0	0	0+0	0	0+0	0
18	GK	(Australia) AUS	Patrick Beach	8	0	0+0	0	4+0	0	4+0	0
2	DF	(Australia) AUS	Miloš Degenek	3	0	0+2	0	0+1	0	0+0	0
2	DF	(Australia) AUS	Gianni Stensness	1	0	0+0	0	0+1	0	0+0	0
3	DF	(Australia) AUS	Alessandro Circati	12	2	2+0	1	6+0	1	4+0	0
4	DF	(Australia) AUS	Kye Rowles	1	0	1+0	0	0+0	0	0+0	0
4	DF	(Australia) AUS	Jacob Italiano	9	0	1+0	0	5+1	0	2+0	0
5	DF	(Australia) AUS	Jordan Bos	8	2	1+1	2	1+1	0	4+0	0
5	DF	(Australia) AUS	Kasey Bos	2	0	0+0	0	0+2	0	0+0	0
6	DF	(Australia) AUS	Jason Geria	9	0	1+1	0	0+5	0	0+2	0
15	DF	(Australia) AUS	Kai Trewin	5	0	1+1	0	1+1	0	0+1	0
15	DF	(Australia) AUS	Dylan Leonard	0	0	0+0	0	0+0	0	0+0	0
16	DF	(Australia) AUS	Aziz Behich	10	0	1+0	0	5+1	0	2+1	0
17	DF	(Australia) AUS	Diesel Herrington	2	0	0+0	0	0+2	0	0+0	0
19	DF	(Australia) AUS	Harry Souttar	10	0	0+0	0	6+0	0	4+0	0
21	DF	(Australia) AUS	Cameron Burgess	6	0	0+2	0	0+2	0	2+0	0
21	DF	(Australia) AUS	Kealey Adamson	0	0	0+0	0	0+0	0	0+0	0
25	DF	(Australia) AUS	Lucas Herrington	10	0	2+0	0	6+0	0	2+0	0
7	MF	(Australia) AUS	Patrick Yazbek	3	0	0+1	0	0+2	0	0+0	0
8	MF	(Australia) AUS	Connor Metcalfe	12	2	2+0	0	5+1	1	3+1	1
10	FW	(Australia) AUS	Ajdin Hrustic	5	0	1+1	0	0+1	0	0+2	0
13	MF	(Australia) AUS	Aiden O'Neill	10	0	2+0	0	2+2	0	4+0	0
13	MF	(Australia) AUS	Daniel Arzani	1	0	0+0	0	0+1	0	0+0	0
14	MF	(Australia) AUS	Riley McGree	6	1	1+1	0	2+2	1	0+0	0
14	MF	(Australia) AUS	Cameron Devlin	1	0	0+0	0	0+1	0	0+0	0
20	MF	(Australia) AUS	Cristian Volpato	4	0	0+0	0	1+0	0	2+1	0
20	MF	(Australia) AUS	Eli Adams	1	0	0+0	0	0+1	0	0+0	0
22	MF	(Australia) AUS	Alex Robertson	1	0	0+1	0	0+0	0	0+0	0
22	MF	(Australia) AUS	Jackson Irvine	8	0	0+0	0	3+1	0	2+2	0
23	MF	(Australia) AUS	Sam Klein	2	0	0+0	0	0+2	0	0+0	0
24	MF	(Australia) AUS	Paul Okon-Engstler	12	0	0+2	0	5+1	0	2+2	0
6	FW	(Australia) AUS	Martin Boyle	1	0	1+0	0	0+0	0	0+0	0
7	FW	(Australia) AUS	Mathew Leckie	3	0	0+0	0	1+1	0	1+0	0
9	FW	(Australia) AUS	Mohamed Touré	5	0	0+0	0	1+1	0	2+1	0
9	FW	(Australia) AUS	Kusini Yengi	2	0	0+0	0	0+2	0	0+0	0
10	FW	(Australia) AUS	Nestory Irankunda	12	5	0+2	2	5+1	2	3+1	1
11	FW	(Australia) AUS	Awer Mabil	4	1	1+1	1	0+1	0	0+1	0
11	FW	(Australia) AUS	Marcus Younis	4	0	0+0	0	0+4	0	0+0	0
20	FW	(Australia) AUS	Eli Adams	0	0	0+0	0	0+0	0	0+0	0
22	FW	(Australia) AUS	Thomas Waddingham	0	0	0+0	0	0+0	0	0+0	0
23	FW	(Australia) AUS	Nishan Velupillay	5	0	0+1	0	0+2	0	1+1	0
23	FW	(Australia) AUS	Yaya Dukuly	0	0	0+0	0	0+0	0	0+0	0
24	FW	(Australia) AUS	Deni Juric	2	0	2+0	0	0+0	0	0+0	0
25	FW	(Australia) AUS	Ante Šuto	0	0	0+0	0	0+0	0	0+0	0
26	FW	(Australia) AUS	Tete Yengi	7	2	0+0	0	5+0	2	0+2	0
