= 2026 FIFA World Cup Group D =

FIFA World Cup group

Group D of the 2026 FIFA World Cup took place from June 12 to 25, 2026. The group consisted of the United States (co-host), Paraguay, Australia, and Turkey. This also marked the return of Turkey and Paraguay to the World Cup finals, their first appearances since 2002 and 2010 respectively.

The United States were the second team to secure their place in the round of 32 after Mexico, and were guaranteed to top the group after two consecutive wins. Australia finished in second place, edging out Paraguay based on head-to-head goal difference. Paraguay's performance allowed them to advance as one of the eight best third-place teams, and would further advance into the round of 16 (all other third-place teams were eliminated by then).

Turkey exited the tournament after two consecutive defeats but managed to beat co-hosts the United States in their final group match.

== Teams ==
Draw position	Team	Pot	Confederation	Method of qualification	Date of qualification	Finals appearance	Last appearance	Previous best performance	FIFA Rankings	
Draw position	Team	Pot	Confederation	Method of qualification	Date of qualification	Finals appearance	Last appearance	Previous best performance	November 2025 (Note: The rankings of November 2025 were used for seeding for the final draw.)	June 2026
D1	United States	1	CONCACAF	Co-host	February 14, 2023 (Note: Although the United bid was selected on June 13, 2018, the automatic berths allocated to the hosts were not confirmed until a decision by the FIFA Council on February 14, 2023.)	12th	2022	Third place (1930)	14	17
D2	Paraguay	3	CONMEBOL	CONMEBOL round robin sixth place	September 4, 2025	9th	2010	Quarterfinals (2010)	39	41
D3	Australia	2	AFC	AFC third round Group C runner-up	June 10, 2025	7th	2022	Round of 16 (2006, 2022)	26	27
D4	Turkey	4 (Note: As the identity of the UEFA second round Path C winner was not known at the time of the final draw, positions in the FIFA Rankings were not taken into account, and the placeholder in the draw was automatically seeded into pot 4.)	UEFA	UEFA second round Path C winner	March 31, 2026	3rd	2002	Third place (2002)	25	22

== Standings ==
Pos	Team	Pld	W	D	L	GF	GA	GD	Pts	Qualification
1	United States (H)	3	2	0	1	8	4	+4	6	Advance to knockout stage
2	Australia	3	1	1	1	2	2	0	4 (Note: Tied on head-to-head result (Paraguay 0–0 Australia). Overall goal difference was used as the tiebreaker.)	Advance to knockout stage
3	Paraguay	3	1	1	1	2	4	−2	4	Advance to knockout stage
4	Turkey	3	1	0	2	3	5	−2	3	

Source: FIFA
Rules for classification: Group stage tiebreakers
(H) Hosts
Notes:

In the round of 32:

- The winner of Group D, the United States, advanced to play the third-place team of Group B, Bosnia and Herzegovina.
- The runner-up of Group D, Australia, advanced to play the runner-up of Group G, Egypt.
- The third-place team of Group D, Paraguay, advanced to play the winner of Group E, Germany, as one of the eight best third-place teams from the group stage.

== Matches ==
All times listed are local, UTC−7 (PDT).

=== United States vs Paraguay ===
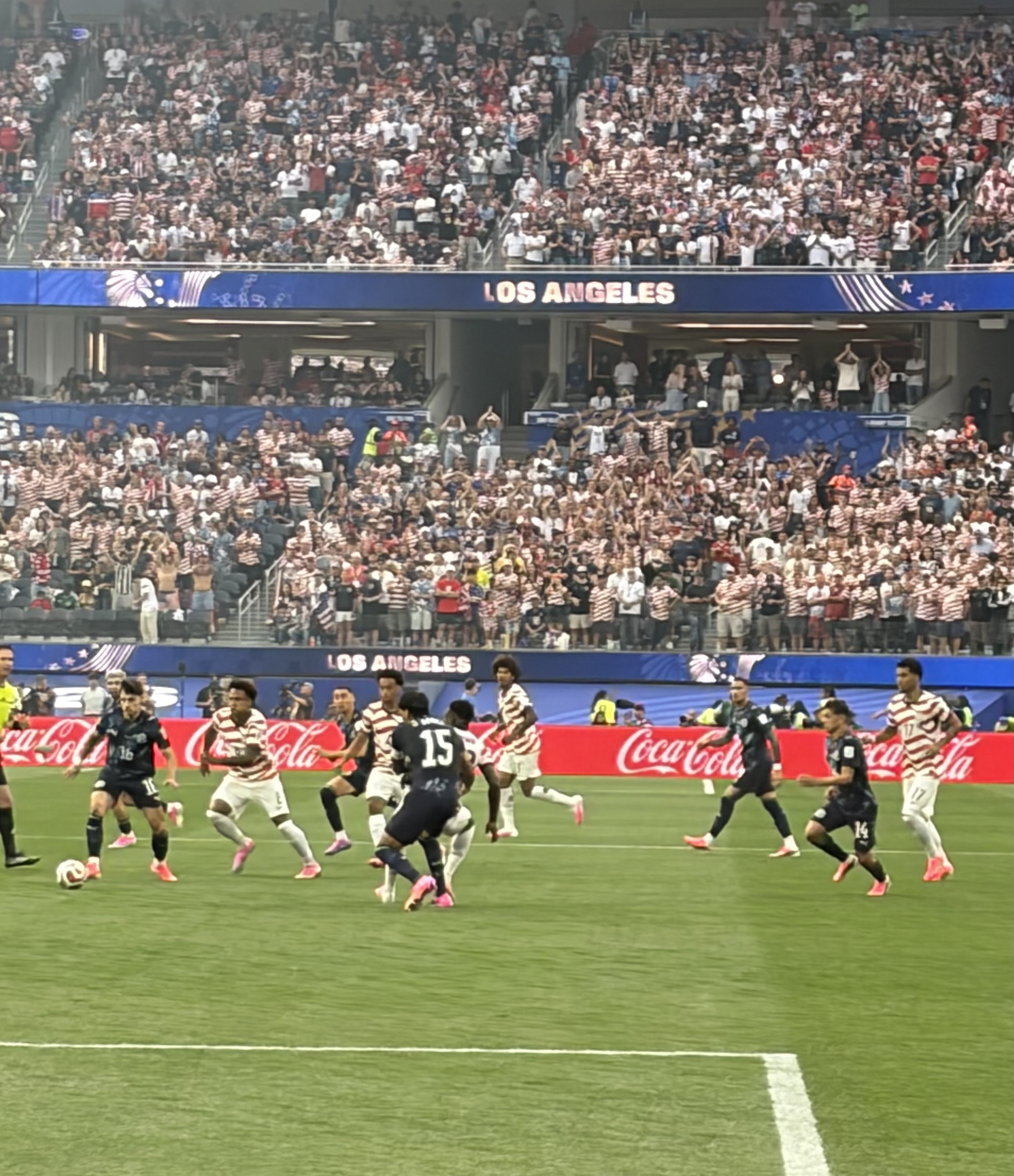
During the United States vs. Paraguay match at SoFi Stadium

The teams had met nine times previously, including once in the World Cup, a 3–0 victory in the group stage for the United States in 1930, and most recently in 2025, a 2–1 win for the United States in a friendly. This match marked the United States' second victory on home soil, the other being 2–1 win over Colombia in the 1994 edition.

The United States went in front in the 7th minute when Damián Bobadilla stuck his foot out and inadvertently put the ball in his own net after a low from the left by Weston McKennie. It was 2–0 in the 31st minute when Folarin Balogun scored with a low side foot finish to the right after a pass from Christian Pulisic on the left. Balogun got his second goal of the game in added time in the first half when he scored with a left-footed shot to the top left corner of the net after cutting in from the right. Maurício pulled a goal back for Paraguay in the 73rd minute with a low finish to the right of the net. In the 98th minute, Giovanni Reyna made it 4–1 with a shot to the left of the net with the outside of his right leg from just inside the penalty area on the right.

With a brace, Folarin Balogun became the first American player to score more than once in a World Cup match since Bert Patenaude scored the tournament's first ever hat-trick in 1930. This also marked the first time the United States ever scored four times in a World Cup match.

June 12, 2026
6:00 p.m.

United States	4–1	Paraguay
Bobadilla 7' (o.g.); Balogun 31', 45+5'; Reyna 90+8'	(Note: "USA vs Paraguay | First Stage | FIFA World Cup 2026". FIFA. Retrieved June 12, 2026.; "Match Report – Group D – USA v. Paraguay". FIFA. June 12, 2026. Retrieved June 12, 2026.; "Post match summary report – Group D – USA v. Paraguay". FIFA. June 13, 2026. Retrieved June 13, 2026.)	Maurício 73'

SoFi Stadium, Inglewood
Attendance: 70,492
Referee: Danny Makkelie (Netherlands)

United States	Paraguay

GK	24	Matt Freese
RB	16	Alex Freeman
CB	3	Chris Richards
CB	13	Tim Ream (c)
LB	5	Antonee Robinson
CM	4	Tyler Adams	(yellow card) 59'
CM	17	Malik Tillman		(substituted off) 82'
RW	2	Sergiño Dest		(substituted off) 72'
AM	8	Weston McKennie
LW	10	Christian Pulisic		(substituted off) 46'
CF	20	Folarin Balogun		(substituted off) 72'
Substitutions:
MF	14	Sebastian Berhalter		(substituted on) 46'
FW	21	Timothy Weah		(substituted on) 72'
FW	9	Ricardo Pepi		(substituted on) 72'
MF	7	Giovanni Reyna		(substituted on) 82'
Manager:
(Argentina) Mauricio Pochettino

GK	12	Orlando Gill
RB	4	Juan José Cáceres	(yellow card) 9'	(substituted off) 79'
CB	15	Gustavo Gómez (c)
CB	3	Omar Alderete
LB	6	Júnior Alonso	(yellow card) 90+3'
RM	8	Diego Gómez	(yellow card) 79'	(substituted off) 79'
CM	14	Andrés Cubas
CM	16	Damián Bobadilla		(substituted off) 46'
LM	10	Miguel Almirón	(yellow card) 53'	(substituted off) 79'
CF	9	Antonio Sanabria		(substituted off) 62'
CF	19	Julio Enciso
Substitutions:
MF	11	Maurício		(substituted on) 46'
FW	18	Álex Arce	(yellow card) 88'	(substituted on) 62'
MF	7	Ramón Sosa		(substituted on) 79'
FW	17	Kaku		(substituted on) 79'
DF	2	Gustavo Velázquez		(substituted on) 79'
Manager:
(Argentina) Gustavo Alfaro

Man of the Match:
Folarin Balogun (United States)

Assistant referees:
Hessel Steegstra (Netherlands)
Jan de Vries (Netherlands)
Fourth official:
Yusuke Araki (Japan)
Reserve assistant referee:
Jun Mihara (Japan)
Video assistant referee:
Carlos del Cerro Grande (Spain)
Assistant video assistant referee:
Dennis Higler (Netherlands)
Support video assistant referee:
Khamis Al-Marri (Qatar)

=== Australia vs Turkey ===
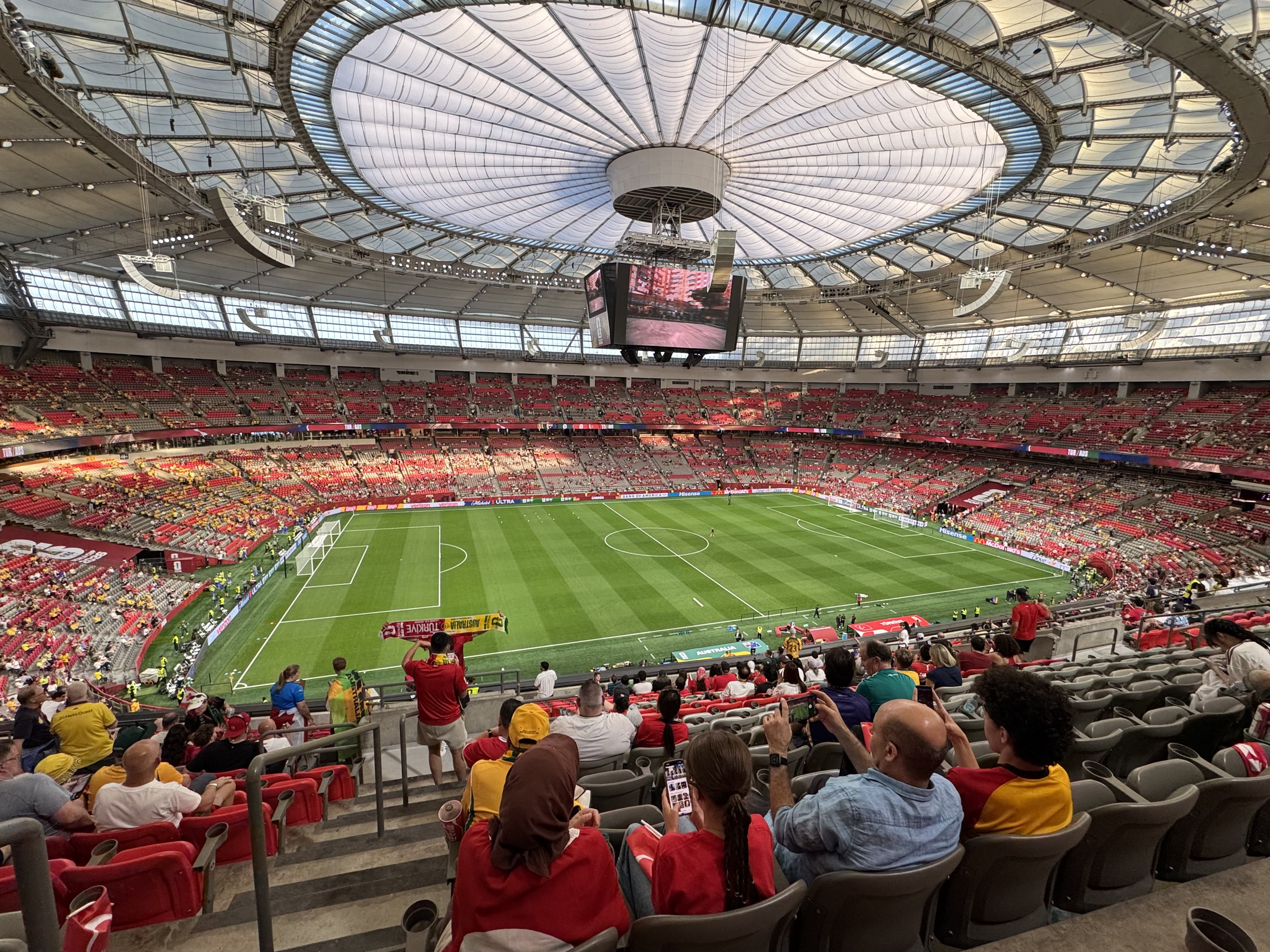
BC Place before the match

The teams had played against each other twice previously, with Turkey winning both friendly matches played in May 2004. This was the only match in Group D held outside of the West Coast of the United States.

The fixture was Turkey's first World Cup game in 24 years, having reached the semi-finals in their previous appearance in 2002. Turkey captain Hakan Çalhanoğlu described his side as "more talented" than Australia in a press conference prior to the game, and predicted his side would dominate the game.

Socceroos coach Tony Popović made a controversial decision to drop seasoned goalkeeper and skipper Mathew Ryan from the starting lineup in favor of young goalkeeper Patrick Beach. In the 27th minute, Nestory Irankunda cut in from the left and scored with a low finish to the left to put Australia in the lead. Shortly after, Turkey almost equalized when a powerful strike by Abdülkerim Bardakçı was parried onto the post by Beach.

In the second half, despite mounting pressure from Turkey, Aussie midfielder Connor Metcalfe made it 2–0 when he cut in from the right before shooting low to the right corner of the net from outside the penalty area.

After the game, Çalhanoğlu maintained his team were better than Australia, regardless of the result. Irankunda, one of the goal scorers for Australia, admitted after the game that the comments were used as motivation by the Australian players.

Regarded as an upset victory, this was Australia's first win in an opening World Cup match since 2006, and their joint-largest overall victory to date.

June 13, 2026
9:00 p.m.

Australia	2–0	Turkey
Irankunda 27'; Metcalfe 75'	(Note: "Australia vs Türkiye | First Stage | FIFA World Cup 2026". FIFA. Retrieved June 14, 2026.; "Match Report – Group D – Australia v. Türkiye". FIFA. June 13, 2026. Retrieved June 14, 2026.; "Post match summary report – Group D – Australia v. Türkiye". FIFA. June 14, 2026. Retrieved June 14, 2026.)

BC Place, Vancouver
Attendance: 52,497
Referee: Jesús Valenzuela (Venezuela)

Australia	Turkey

GK	18	Patrick Beach
CB	3	Alessandro Circati
CB	19	Harry Souttar (c)
CB	21	Cameron Burgess
RWB	4	Jacob Italiano	(substituted off) 74'
LWB	5	Jordan Bos	(substituted off) 83'
RM	8	Connor Metcalfe
CM	24	Paul Okon-Engstler	(substituted off) 83'
CM	13	Aiden O'Neill
LM	17	Nestory Irankunda	(substituted off) 61'
CF	9	Mohamed Touré	(substituted off) 74'
Substitutions:
FW	23	Nishan Velupillay	(substituted on) 61'
FW	26	Tete Yengi	(substituted on) 74'
DF	6	Jason Geria	(substituted on) 74'
MF	22	Jackson Irvine	(substituted on) 83'
DF	16	Aziz Behich	(substituted on) 83'
Manager:
Tony Popovic

GK	23	Uğurcan Çakır
RB	2	Zeki Çelik		(substituted off) 80'
CB	3	Merih Demiral
CB	14	Abdülkerim Bardakcı
LB	20	Ferdi Kadıoğlu
CM	10	Hakan Çalhanoğlu (c)
CM	16	İsmail Yüksek		(substituted off) 80'
RW	8	Arda Güler
AM	6	Orkun Kökçü		(substituted off) 62'
LW	21	Barış Alper Yılmaz		(substituted off) 46'
CF	7	Kerem Aktürkoğlu		(substituted off) 85'
Substitutions:
FW	11	Kenan Yıldız		(substituted on) 46'
FW	19	Yunus Akgün	(yellow card) 86'	(substituted on) 62'
MF	5	Salih Özcan		(substituted on) 80'
DF	18	Mert Müldür		(substituted on) 80'
FW	9	Deniz Gül		(substituted on) 85'
Manager:
(Italy) Vincenzo Montella

Man of the Match:
Nestory Irankunda (Australia)

Assistant referees:
Jorge Urrego (Venezuela)
Tulio Moreno (Venezuela)
Fourth official:
Kevin Ortega (Peru)
Reserve assistant referee:
Michael Orué (Peru)
Video assistant referee:
Tatiana Guzmán (Nicaragua)
Assistant video assistant referee:
Juan Soto (Venezuela)
Support video assistant referee:
Fu Ming (China)

=== United States vs Australia ===
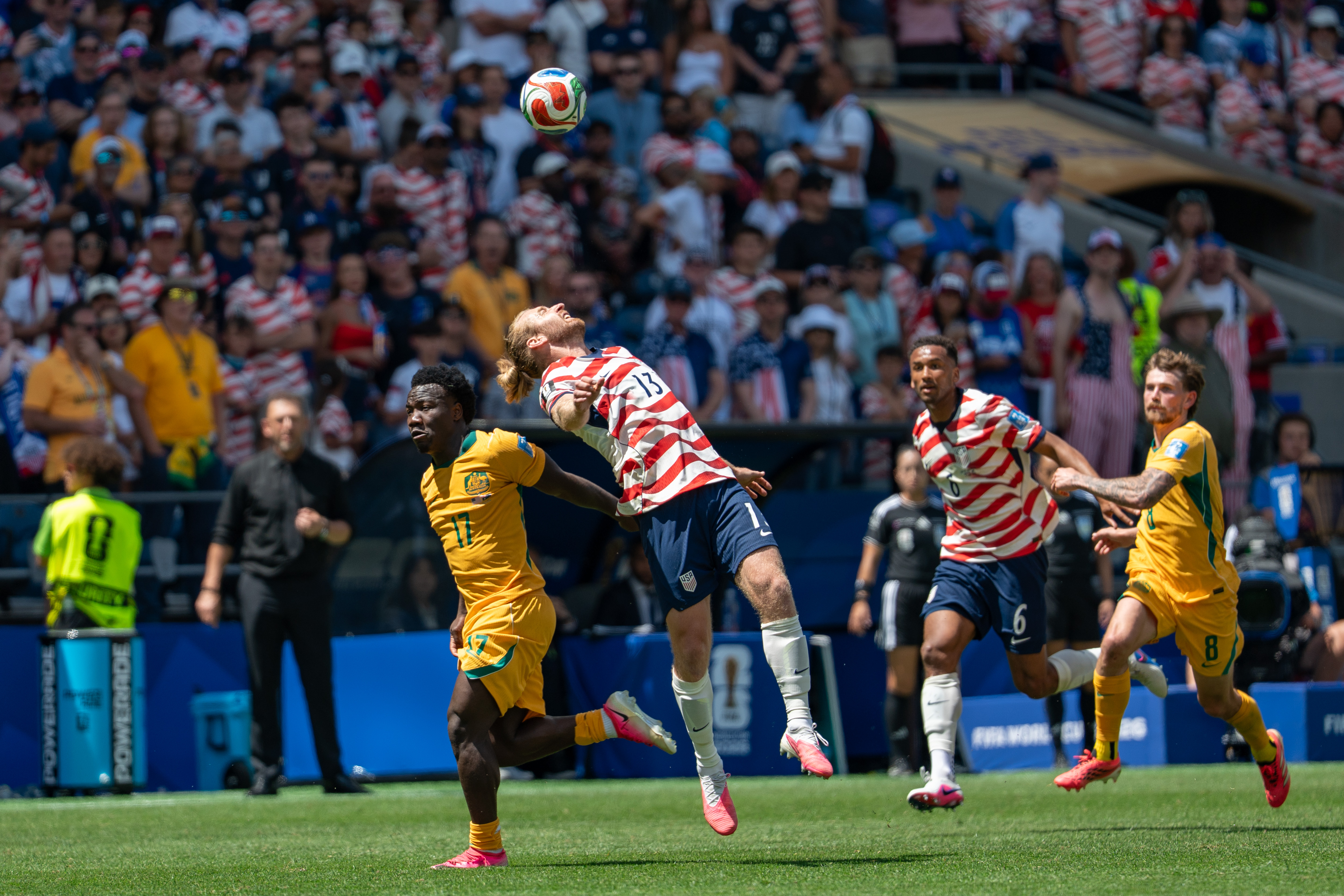
During the match between the United States and Australia

The teams have faced each other four times before the tournament, most recently in 2025, a 2–1 win for the United States in a friendly.

Australia applied some early pressure and Mohamed Touré had a shot on goal after just 40 seconds, but it was comfortably saved by United States goalkeeper Matt Freese. Cameron Burgess committed an own goal in the 11th minute, and Alex Freeman headed the ball past Patrick Beach to make the score 2–0 just before halftime.

Australia coach Tony Popovic made three changes at half time, including bringing on Nestory Irankunda and Connor Metcalfe, in an attempt to turn the game in Australia's favour. Cristian Volpato was later substituted on with half an hour left, replacing Mathew Leckie, who had been struggling with a hamstring injury. Volpato managed a shot on goal which went over the crossbar, and later Metcalfe shot directly at Freese.

Australia continued to struggle with creating any genuine chances throughout the match, and the United States comfortably defended their lead in the second half. With the win, the United States officially qualified for the Round of 32, becoming the second team overall to do so after Mexico.

June 19, 2026
12:00 p.m.

United States	2–0	Australia
Burgess 11' (o.g.); Freeman 43'	(Note: "USA vs Australia | First Stage | FIFA World Cup 2026". FIFA. Retrieved June 19, 2026.; "Match Report – Group D – USA v. Australia". FIFA. June 19, 2026. Retrieved June 19, 2026.; "Post match summary report – Group D – USA v. Australia". FIFA. June 19, 2026. Retrieved June 20, 2026.)

Lumen Field, Seattle
Attendance: 66,925
Referee: Felix Zwayer (Germany)

United States	Australia

GK	24	Matt Freese
CB	16	Alex Freeman
CB	3	Chris Richards	(yellow card) 90+3'
CB	13	Tim Ream (c)
RM	2	Sergiño Dest		(substituted off) 80'
CM	8	Weston McKennie		(substituted off) 90+6'
CM	4	Tyler Adams
CM	17	Malik Tillman
LM	5	Antonee Robinson	(yellow card) 56'	(substituted off) 80'
CF	20	Folarin Balogun	(yellow card) 89'	(substituted off) 90+6'
CF	9	Ricardo Pepi		(substituted off) 74'
Substitutions:
MF	14	Sebastian Berhalter		(substituted on) 74'
DF	6	Auston Trusty		(substituted on) 80'
DF	23	Joe Scally		(substituted on) 80'
FW	19	Haji Wright		(substituted on) 90+6'
MF	7	Giovanni Reyna		(substituted on) 90+6'
Manager:
(Argentina) Mauricio Pochettino

GK	18	Patrick Beach
CB	3	Alessandro Circati	(yellow card) 32'
CB	19	Harry Souttar (c)	(yellow card) 89'
CB	21	Cameron Burgess		(substituted off) 46'
RWB	4	Jacob Italiano	(yellow card) 89'
LWB	5	Jordan Bos	(yellow card) 16'
RM	7	Mathew Leckie		(substituted off) 61'
CM	13	Aiden O'Neill
CM	24	Paul Okon-Engstler		(substituted off) 78'
LM	23	Nishan Velupillay		(substituted off) 46'
CF	9	Mohamed Touré		(substituted off) 46'
Substitutions:
DF	6	Jason Geria		(substituted on) 46'
FW	17	Nestory Irankunda		(substituted on) 46'
MF	8	Connor Metcalfe		(substituted on) 46'
FW	20	Cristian Volpato		(substituted on) 61'
MF	22	Jackson Irvine		(substituted on) 78'
Manager:
Tony Popovic

Man of the Match:
Folarin Balogun (United States)

Assistant referees:
Robert Kempter (Germany)
Christian Dietz (Germany)
Fourth official:
Katia Itzel García (Mexico)
Reserve assistant referee:
Sandra Ramírez (Mexico)
Video assistant referee:
Bastian Dankert (Germany)
Assistant video assistant referee:
Hamza El Fariq (Morocco)
Support video assistant referee:
Bram Van Driessche (Belgium)

=== Turkey vs Paraguay ===
The teams have only met once before, in a scoreless draw of a friendly in 1995.

Turkey's loss confirmed their elimination from the tournament due to the head-to-head tiebreaker, making them the second team to be knocked out after Haiti, who became the first to be eliminated hours earlier following a 3–0 defeat against Brazil in Philadelphia. This marked their first early exit from a major tournament since UEFA Euro 2020, where they were also eliminated following two consecutive defeats. The result also confirmed the United States as the winner of the group due to the same tiebreaker. It was also the first time that Turkey failed to score in two consecutive World Cup matches.

Miguel Almirón became the first player to be sent off under FIFA's new law prohibiting players from covering their mouths during confrontations with opponents, receiving a straight red card after a VAR review following an altercation with Mert Müldür in the stoppage time of the first half.

With 32 shot attempts and no goals scored, Turkey surpassed Portugal’s 2006 quarter-final record of 31 shots for the most attempts in a single World Cup match without scoring. Combined with its 30 attempts against Australia, Turkey now holds the tournament record for the most shots without a goal across two consecutive matches, totaling 62 attempts.

After 64 seconds, Matías Galarza scored with a low left-foot shot from outside the penalty area into the right corner of the net to put Paraguay in front. The goal was the fastest goal of the tournament to date, surpassing the previous record of 71 seconds set by Morocco's Ismael Saibari against Scotland hours earlier in Boston.

June 19, 2026
8:00 p.m.

Turkey	0–1	Paraguay
	(Note: "Türkiye vs Paraguay | First Stage | FIFA World Cup 2026". FIFA. Retrieved June 19, 2026.; "Match Report – Group D – Türkiye v. Paraguay". FIFA. June 19, 2026. Retrieved June 20, 2026.; "Post match summary report – Group D – Türkiye v. Paraguay". FIFA. June 19, 2026. Retrieved June 20, 2026.)	Galarza 2'

Levi's Stadium, Santa Clara
Attendance: 68,827
Referee: Iván Barton (El Salvador)

Turkey	Paraguay

GK	23	Uğurcan Çakır
RB	18	Mert Müldür
CB	3	Merih Demiral
CB	14	Abdülkerim Bardakcı		(substituted off) 86'
LB	20	Ferdi Kadıoğlu		(substituted off) 70'
CM	16	İsmail Yüksek		(substituted off) 60'
CM	10	Hakan Çalhanoğlu (c)
RW	19	Yunus Akgün		(substituted off) 60'
AM	8	Arda Güler
LW	11	Kenan Yıldız
CF	7	Kerem Aktürkoğlu		(substituted off) 46'
Substitutions:
FW	21	Barış Yılmaz		(substituted on) 46'
FW	26	Can Uzun		(substituted on) 60'
FW	9	Deniz Gül		(substituted on) 60'
DF	13	Eren Elmalı	(yellow card) 71'	(substituted on) 70'
MF	6	Orkun Kökçü		(substituted on) 86'
Manager:
(Italy) Vincenzo Montella			(yellow card) 63'

GK	12	Orlando Gill
RB	4	Juan José Cáceres		(substituted off) 81'
CB	15	Gustavo Gómez (c)
CB	3	Omar Alderete
LB	6	Júnior Alonso
CM	14	Andrés Cubas
CM	8	Diego Gómez		(substituted off) 67'
RW	10	Miguel Almirón	(red card) 45+3'
AM	19	Julio Enciso		(substituted off) 90+2'
LW	23	Matías Galarza	(yellow card) 4'	(substituted off) 90+2'
CF	25	Isidro Pitta		(substituted off) 46'
Substitutions:
MF	16	Damián Bobadilla		(substituted on) 46'
DF	2	Gustavo Velázquez		(substituted on) 67'
DF	26	Alexandro Maidana		(substituted on) 81'
FW	21	Gabriel Ávalos		(substituted on) 90+2'
DF	13	José Canale		(substituted on) 90+2'
Other disciplinary actions:
TS	—	Carlos González	(yellow card) 37'
Manager:
(Argentina) Gustavo Alfaro

Man of the Match:
Matías Galarza (Paraguay)

Assistant referees:
David Morán (El Salvador)
Henry Pupiro (Nicaragua)
Fourth official:
Oshane Nation (Jamaica)
Reserve assistant referee:
Caleb Wales (Trinidad and Tobago)
Video assistant referee:
Khamis Al-Marri (Qatar)
Assistant video assistant referee:
Tatiana Guzmán (Nicaragua)
Support video assistant referee:
Abdullah Al-Shehri (Saudi Arabia)

=== Turkey vs United States ===
The teams had faced each other five times prior to the tournament, most recently in 2025, a 2–1 win for Turkey in a friendly.

The match was considered a "dead rubber", as after matchday two the United States were confirmed as group winners and Turkey were confirmed in fourth and eliminated due to the tiebreaker rules. As a result, United States coach Mauricio Pochettino fielded almost a completely different side to that used in their opening two fixtures, featuring nine new starters.

A dramatic stoppage-time goal by Kaan Ayhan secured Turkey's first World Cup match victory since 2002 (when it finished third), and handed co-host United States its first defeat of the tournament. United States completed the group stage of the tournament with their best ever finish of 6 points from three matches, and also with their highest World Cup goal tally of eight. Had they won the game, it would have marked the first time any United States side had won three World Cup fixtures in a row.

With this result, the United States had reached the knockout round in three of its last four attempts at the World Cup, with two exits in the round of 16, and a 2002 run to the quarterfinals that remains the national team's best performance, excluding finishing third in the first World Cup in 1930.

Furthermore, this marked the second defeat for a tournament co-host, following Canada's 2–1 loss to Switzerland the previous day in Vancouver. This leaves Mexico as the only co-host to remain undefeated, having won all of their group stage matches.

June 25, 2026
7:00 p.m.

Turkey	3–2	United States
Güler 10'; Yılmaz 31'; Ayhan 90+8'	(Note: "Türkiye vs USA | First Stage | FIFA World Cup 2026". FIFA. Retrieved June 26, 2026.; "Match Report – Group D – Türkiye v. USA". FIFA. June 26, 2026. Retrieved June 26, 2026.; "Post match summary report – Group D – Türkiye v. USA". FIFA. June 26, 2026. Retrieved June 27, 2026.)	Trusty 3'; Berhalter 49'

SoFi Stadium, Inglewood
Attendance: 70,492
Referee: Mustapha Ghorbal (Algeria)

Turkey	United States

GK	23	Uğurcan Çakır
CB	2	Zeki Çelik (c)	(substituted off) 84'
CB	15	Ozan Kabak
CB	14	Abdülkerim Bardakcı
RM	24	Oğuz Aydın	(substituted off) 90+1'
CM	6	Orkun Kökçü	(substituted off) 88'
CM	5	Salih Özcan
LM	13	Eren Elmalı
RF	8	Arda Güler
CF	21	Barış Alper Yılmaz	(substituted off) 90+1'
LF	11	Kenan Yıldız	(substituted off) 84'
Substitutions:
FW	26	Can Uzun	(substituted on) 84'
DF	4	Çağlar Söyüncü	(substituted on) 84'
DF	22	Kaan Ayhan	(substituted on) 88'
DF	18	Mert Müldür	(substituted on) 90+1'
MF	17	İrfan Can Kahveci	(substituted on) 90+1'
Manager:
(Italy) Vincenzo Montella

GK	1	Matt Turner
RB	23	Joe Scally		(substituted off) 76'
CB	12	Miles Robinson
CB	22	Mark McKenzie
LB	6	Auston Trusty
DM	8	Weston McKennie (c)		(substituted off) 86'
CM	14	Sebastian Berhalter	(yellow card) 19'
CM	7	Giovanni Reyna		(substituted off) 76'
RF	11	Brenden Aaronson		(substituted off) 76'
CF	9	Ricardo Pepi
LF	21	Timothy Weah		(substituted off) 58'
Substitutions:
FW	10	Christian Pulisic		(substituted on) 58'
DF	2	Sergiño Dest		(substituted on) 76'
FW	26	Alejandro Zendejas		(substituted on) 76'
DF	16	Alex Freeman		(substituted on) 76'
MF	17	Malik Tillman		(substituted on) 86'
Manager:
(Argentina) Mauricio Pochettino

Man of the Match:
Arda Güler (Turkey)

Assistant referees:
Mokrane Gourari (Algeria)
Abbes Akram Zerhouni (Algeria)
Fourth official:
Omar Al Ali (United Arab Emirates)
Reserve assistant referee:
Mohamed Al-Hammadi (United Arab Emirates)
Video assistant referee:
Antonio García (Uruguay)
Assistant video assistant referee:
Mahmoud Ashour (Egypt)
Support video assistant referee:
Juan Lara (Chile)

=== Paraguay vs Australia ===
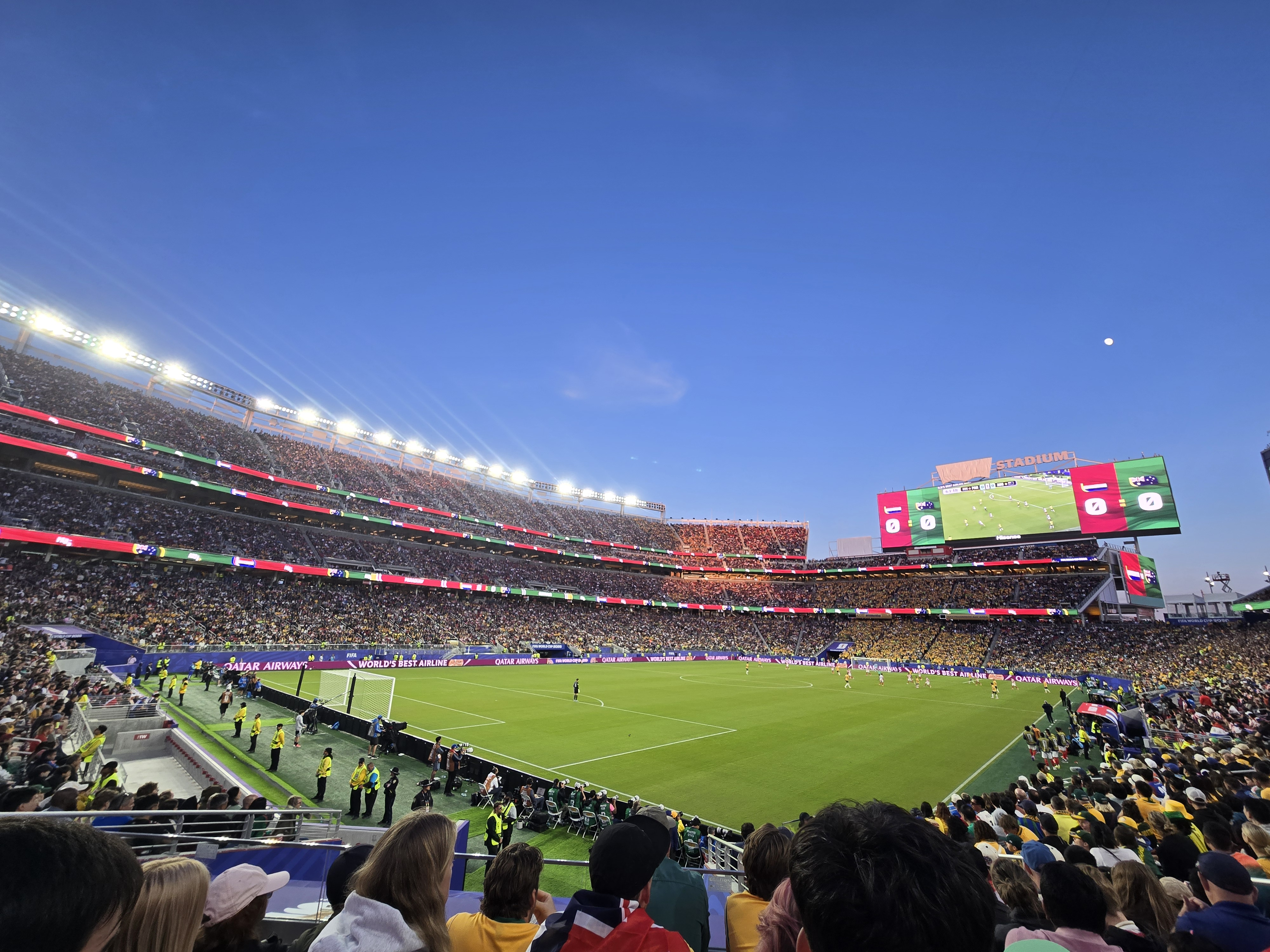
Levi's Stadium during the match

The teams had previously faced each other five times, most recently in 2010, a 1–0 win for Australia in a friendly match.

The match ended in a scoreless draw, securing Australia second place in the group and also allowing Paraguay to advance the following day once enough third-place teams had finished with three points or less.

June 25, 2026
7:00 p.m.

Paraguay	0–0	Australia
	(Note: "Paraguay vs Australia | First Stage | FIFA World Cup 2026". FIFA. Retrieved June 26, 2026.; "Match Report – Group D – Paraguay v. Australia". FIFA. June 26, 2026. Retrieved June 26, 2026.; "Post match summary report – Group D – Paraguay v. Australia". FIFA. June 26, 2026. Retrieved June 27, 2026.)

Levi's Stadium, Santa Clara
Attendance: 68,827
Referee: Clément Turpin (France)

Paraguay	Australia

GK	12	Orlando Gill
CB	2	Gustavo Velázquez
CB	15	Gustavo Gómez (c)
CB	3	Omar Alderete		(substituted off) 84'
RWB	4	Juan José Cáceres
LWB	26	Alexandro Maidana		(substituted off) 46'
CM	14	Andrés Cubas
CM	8	Diego Gómez	(yellow card) 77'	(substituted off) 90+2'
CM	23	Matías Galarza		(substituted off) 90+2'
CF	21	Gabriel Ávalos		(substituted off) 67'
CF	19	Julio Enciso
Substitutions:
MF	11	Maurício		(substituted on) 46'
FW	18	Álex Arce		(substituted on) 67'
DF	13	José Canale		(substituted on) 84'
DF	6	Júnior Alonso		(substituted on) 90+2'
MF	16	Damián Bobadilla		(substituted on) 90+2'
Manager:
(Argentina) Gustavo Alfaro

GK	18	Patrick Beach
CB	3	Alessandro Circati
CB	19	Harry Souttar (c)
CB	25	Lucas Herrington
RM	5	Jordan Bos
CM	22	Jackson Irvine	(yellow card) 46'	(substituted off) 84'
CM	13	Aiden O'Neill
LM	16	Aziz Behich
RF	20	Cristian Volpato		(substituted off) 58'
CF	17	Nestory Irankunda		(substituted off) 84'
LF	8	Connor Metcalfe
Substitutions:
MF	10	Ajdin Hrustic		(substituted on) 58'
MF	24	Paul Okon-Engstler		(substituted on) 84'
FW	26	Tete Yengi		(substituted on) 84'
Manager:
Tony Popovic

Man of the Match:
Aiden O'Neill (Australia)

Assistant referees:
Nicolas Danos (France)
Benjamin Pagès (France)
Fourth official:
Oshane Nation (Jamaica)
Reserve assistant referee:
Caleb Wales (Trinidad and Tobago)
Video assistant referee:
Jérôme Brisard (France)
Assistant video assistant referee:
Willy Delajod (France)
Support video assistant referee:
Hamza El Fariq (Morocco)

== Discipline ==
The team conduct ("fair play") score would have been used as a tiebreaker if the head-to-head and overall records of teams were tied. It would also be used as a tiebreaker for the third-place ranking between groups if the overall records of teams were tied. The score was calculated based on yellow and red cards received by players and team officials in all group matches as follows:

- yellow card: −1 point;
- indirect red card (second yellow card): −3 points;
- direct red card: −4 points;
- yellow card and direct red card: −5 points;

Only one of the above deductions could be applied to a player or team official in a single match.

Team	Match 1				Match 2				Match 3				Score
Team	Yellow card	(yellow card) (yellow-red card)	Red card	(yellow card) (red card)	Yellow card	(yellow card) (yellow-red card)	Red card	(yellow card) (red card)	Yellow card	(yellow card) (yellow-red card)	Red card	(yellow card) (red card)	Score
Turkey	1				2								−3
Australia					4				1				–5
United States	1				3				1				−5
Paraguay	5				2		1		1				−12
