= Circati =

Circati is a surname. Notable people with the surname include:

- Alessandro Circati (born 2003), Australian soccer player
- Gianfranco Circati (born 1971), Italian soccer player
