= 2025 Australia national soccer team season =

- Season: 2025
- Manager: Tony Popovic
- Captain: Mathew Ryan
- Top goalscorer: Jackson Irvine (3)
- Players: 40
- Goalscorers: 11
- Debutants: 9
- Biggest home win: Australia 5–1 Indonesia (20 March)
- Biggest away win: China 0–2 Australia (25 March)
- Highest scoring: Australia 5–1 Indonesia (20 March)
- Longest winning run: 7 (20 March–10 October)
- Longest unbeaten run: 7 (20 March–10 October)
- Longest winless run: 3 (14 October–18 November)
- Longest losing run: 3 (14 October–18 November)
- Highest attendance: 57,226; Australia 1–0 Japan (5 June)
- Lowest attendance: 19,115; Australia 1–0 New Zealand (5 September)
- Average attendance: 37,194
Home colours	Away colours

This page summarises the Australia men's national soccer team fixtures and results in 2025.

== Summary ==
Australia opened the year sitting second place in their 2026 World Cup qualifiers group, with four games remaining. They won their first match against Indonesia at home 5–1, with Jackson Irvine scoring a brace and Martin Boyle, Nishan Velupillay, and Lewis Miller scoring a goal each. Indonesia pulled one back through Dutch-born Ole Romeny. The second match away against China ended with an Australian victory, with Irvine and Velupillay each scoring to ensure a 2–0 scoreline, while midfielder Ryan Teague made his senior international debut. In their third match of the year, Australia hosted Japan in Perth, beating them 1–0 with Aziz Behich scoring his first goal in 13 years during stoppage time. Optus Stadium was sold out for the game, with a record 57,226 fans marking the largest crowd since 2017. The result placed Australia in second place in the group poised to qualify directly for the World Cup, with a loss by five or more goals to Saudi Arabia being the only possible scenario for them to miss out. In the last match, Australia secured their place at the 2026 World Cup with a 2–1 come-from-behind win over Saudi Arabia in Jeddah. After Abdulrahman Al-Aboud opened the scoring for the hosts, Connor Metcalfe equalised with his first international goal and Mitch Duke scored the winner. This marked the first time they qualified directly since the 2014 edition and their sixth consecutive qualification.

Following their qualification for the FIFA World Cup for the first time since 2010, New Zealand proposed reigniting the Soccer Ashes series against Australia as part of their tournament preparation. The 2025 edition of the series was confirmed in June, with two matches scheduled for September in Canberra at GIO Stadium and in Auckland at Go Media Stadium. Australia won the home leg in Canberra 1–0, with Max Balard scoring on debut and Paul Izzo and Nicolas Milanovic making their international debuts too. The return leg, away in Auckland, was also won by Australia with a 3–1 scoreline, with Australia retaining the Soccer Ashes with a 4–1 aggregate victory. Leading the way for Australia were former Adelaide United South Australian duo Mohamed Toure and Nestory Irankunda who scored a brace and a single goal. New Zealand only managed to pull one back with Chris Wood's goal.

In July 2025, Football Australia announced that the team would travel to North America in October to play friendlies against Canada in Montreal and against the United States in Colorado. Australia won the friendly against Canada 1–0 with Irankunda scoring the goal and Jacob Italiano making his international debut. Against the United States, Australia recorded their first loss since Tony Popovic took over as coach. Despite Jordan Bos scoring the first goal, American striker Haji Wright scored a brace to give the United States a 2–1 victory. The loss also prevented Australia from climbing up the FIFA rankings which would potentially gift them an easier draw at the 2026 World Cup group stage.

Continue their preparation for the 2026 World Cup, the Australian team returned to the United States in November 2025 to play friendlies against Venezuela and Colombia. They lost the first match to Venezuela 1–0 with Jesús Ramírez scoring the only goal. Australia started the match with Patrick Beach, Kai Trewin, and Paul Okon-Engstler making their debuts, while Al Hassan Toure came on in the second half to make his debut too. Before the second match, a virus hit the playing group, reducing training time and match fitness, and Australia lost to Colombia 3–0 with James Rodríguez, Luis Díaz, and Jefferson Lerma scoring.

== Record ==
As of match played 18 November 2025

Type	GP	W	D	L	GF	GA
Friendly	6	3	0	3	6	7
World Cup qualifiers	4	4	0	0	10	2
Total	10	7	0	3	16	9

== Match results ==
=== Friendlies ===
5 September Soccer Ashes	Australia	1–0	New Zealand	Canberra, Australia
19:45 UTC+10	Balard 87'	Report		Stadium: GIO Stadium; Attendance: 19,115; Referee: Donald Robertson (Scotland)

9 September Soccer Ashes	New Zealand	1–3	Australia	Auckland, New Zealand
19:00 UTC+12	Wood 57'	Report	Toure 35', 60'; Irankunda 54'	Stadium: Go Media Stadium; Attendance: 18,213; Referee: Donald Robertson (Scotland)

10 October	Canada	0–1	Australia	Montreal, Canada
19:30 UTC−6		Report	Irankunda 71'	Stadium: Saputo Stadium; Attendance: 23,112; Referee: Steven Madrigal (Costa Rica)

14 October	United States	2–1	Australia	Commerce City, United States
19:00 UTC−6	Wright 33', 51'	Report	Bos 19'	Stadium: Dick's Sporting Goods Park; Attendance: 18,218; Referee: Pierre-Luc Lauziere (Canada)

14 November	Venezuela	1–0	Australia	Houston, United States
20:00 UTC−6	Ramírez 38'	Report		Stadium: Shell Energy Stadium; Referee: Armando Villarreal (United States)

18 November	Colombia	3–0	Australia	New York City, United States
21:00 UTC−4	Rodríguez 76' (pen.); Díaz 89'; Lerma 90+3'	Report		Stadium: Citi Field; Referee: Tori Penso (United States)

=== World Cup qualifiers ===
20 March Third round	Australia	5–1	Indonesia	Sydney, Australia
20:10 UTC+11	Boyle 18' (pen.); Velupillay 20'; Irvine 34', 90'; Miller 61'	Report	Romeny 78'	Stadium: Sydney Football Stadium; Attendance: 35,241; Referee: Adham Makhadmeh (Jordan)

25 March Third round	China	0–2	Australia	Hangzhou, China
19:00 UTC+8		Report	Irvine 16'; Velupillay 29'	Stadium: Hangzhou Olympic Sports Center Stadium; Attendance: 70,588; Referee: Mooud Bonyadifard (Iran)

5 June Third round	Australia	1–0	Japan	Perth, Australia
19:00 UTC+8	Behich 90'	Report		Stadium: Perth Stadium; Attendance: 57,226; Referee: Qasim Al-Hatmi (Oman)

10 June Third round	Saudi Arabia	1–2	Australia	Jeddah, Saudi Arabia
21:15 UTC+3	Al-Aboud 19'	Report	Metcalfe 42'; Duke 48'	Stadium: King Abdullah Sports City; Attendance: 24,620; Referee: Abdulrahman Al-Jassim (Qatar)

== Player statistics ==
Correct as of 18 November 2025 (v. Colombia).
Numbers are listed by player's number in last match played

No.	Pos	Nat	Player	Total		Friendlies		World Cup qualifiers	
No.	Pos	Nat	Player	Apps	Goals	Apps	Goals	Apps	Goals
1	GK	(Australia) AUS	Mathew Ryan	5	0	1+0	0	4+0	0
1	GK	(Australia) AUS	Tom Glover	0	0	0+0	0	0+0	0
12	GK	(Australia) AUS	Paul Izzo	4	0	4+0	0	0+0	0
18	GK	(Australia) AUS	Joe Gauci	1	0	0+1	0	0+0	0
18	GK	(Australia) AUS	Patrick Beach	1	0	1+0	0	0+0	0
2	DF	(Australia) AUS	Miloš Degenek	9	0	5+0	0	3+1	0
3	DF	(Australia) AUS	Lewis Miller	10	1	3+3	0	4+0	1
4	DF	(Australia) AUS	Kye Rowles	4	0	3+0	0	1+0	0
5	DF	(Australia) AUS	Jordan Bos	4	1	2+2	1	0+0	0
5	DF	(Australia) AUS	Callum Elder	2	0	0+2	0	0+0	0
10	DF	(Australia) AUS	Kasey Bos	0	0	0+0	0	0+0	0
14	DF	(Australia) AUS	Jason Davidson	0	0	0+0	0	0+0	0
15	DF	(Australia) AUS	Kai Trewin	2	0	2+0	0	0+0	0
16	DF	(Australia) AUS	Aziz Behich	4	1	0+0	0	4+0	1
19	DF	(Australia) AUS	Fran Karačić	2	0	0+0	0	0+2	0
20	DF	(Australia) AUS	Alex Grant	0	0	0+0	0	0+0	0
20	DF	(Australia) AUS	Jacob Italiano	2	0	2+0	0	0+0	0
21	DF	(Australia) AUS	Cameron Burgess	9	0	4+1	0	4+0	0
22	DF	(Australia) AUS	Jason Geria	7	0	3+0	0	3+1	0
23	DF	(Australia) AUS	Alessandro Circati	5	0	4+0	0	1+0	0
24	DF	(Australia) AUS	James Overy	0	0	0+0	0	0+0	0
25	DF	(Australia) AUS	Hayden Matthews	0	0	0+0	0	0+0	0
25	DF	(Australia) AUS	Jack Iredale	0	0	0+0	0	0+0	0
5	MF	(Australia) AUS	Anthony Caceres	2	0	0+0	0	0+2	0
8	MF	(Australia) AUS	Connor Metcalfe	8	1	6+0	0	2+0	1
10	MF	(Australia) AUS	Ajdin Hrustic	3	0	1+2	0	0+0	0
13	MF	(Australia) AUS	Aiden O'Neill	9	0	4+1	0	3+1	0
14	MF	(Australia) AUS	Riley McGree	5	0	2+1	0	0+2	0
16	MF	(Australia) AUS	Max Balard	5	1	3+2	1	0+0	0
17	MF	(Australia) AUS	Ryan Teague	4	0	1+0	0	2+1	0
17	MF	(Australia) AUS	Cameron Devlin	0	0	0+0	0	0+0	0
19	MF	(Australia) AUS	Patrick Yazbek	6	0	1+3	0	1+1	0
20	MF	(Australia) AUS	Paul Okon-Engstler	2	0	1+1	0	0+0	0
22	MF	(Australia) AUS	Jackson Irvine	4	3	1+1	0	2+0	3
6	FW	(Australia) AUS	Martin Boyle	10	1	2+4	0	4+0	1
7	FW	(Australia) AUS	Nishan Velupillay	2	2	0+0	0	2+0	2
7	FW	(Australia) AUS	Nicolas Milanovic	2	0	0+2	0	0+0	0
7	FW	(Australia) AUS	Nicholas D'Agostino	1	0	1+0	0	0+0	0
7	FW	(Australia) AUS	Nestory Irankunda	5	1	2+3	1	0+0	0
9	FW	(Australia) AUS	Kusini Yengi	0	0	0+0	0	0+0	0
9	FW	(Australia) AUS	Adam Taggart	1	0	0+0	0	1+0	0
9	FW	(Australia) AUS	Mohamed Toure	7	2	4+2	2	0+1	0
11	FW	(Australia) AUS	Brandon Borrello	3	0	0+0	0	2+1	0
11	FW	(Australia) AUS	Adrian Segecic	0	0	0+0	0	0+0	0
11	FW	(Australia) AUS	Daniel Arzani	4	0	0+1	0	0+3	0
11	FW	(Australia) AUS	Al Hassan Toure	1	0	0+1	0	0+0	0
15	FW	(Australia) AUS	Mitchell Duke	5	2	1+1	1	1+2	1
20	FW	(Australia) AUS	Samuel Silvera	1	0	1+0	0	0+0	0
20	FW	(Australia) AUS	Marco Tilio	1	0	0+0	0	0+1	0
23	FW	(Australia) AUS	Craig Goodwin	2	0	1+0	0	0+1	0
