= Gill family disappearance =

Argentine missing persons case

- Disappeared: January 13, 2002; Entre Ríos Province, Argentina
- Status: Missing for 24 years, 7 months and 23 days

On January 13, 2002, six members of the Gill family vanished without a trace in the Entre Ríos Province of Argentina. Their whereabouts remain unknown. This case has been characterized as "mysterious" by much of the press and those involved in it.

The family lived on the La Candelaria estancia, where Rubén Gill and his wife Margarita worked as landlords and in various local jobs. The estancia, around 500 hectares, is located in the town of Crucecitas Séptimas, 50 km (31 mi) from Paraná, the provincial capital, and belonged to Alfonso Goette.

== Day of the disappearance ==
On the night of January 12, 2002, the family went to Viale, a nearby town, to the abode of a friend named Máximo Vega. This is the last time they were seen. In April of that same year, Goette contacted relatives to inform them that the Gills had not returned from the three-month vacation they were given in January. According to the police investigation, on January 13, calls were made from Rubén's cell phone to the phone of a woman residing in Rosario, whom they were unable to trace. This cell phone remained active until April 2003, 15 months after the case. A neighbor surnamed Villanueva, who lived across the La Candelaria estancia, claimed that he had seen Mencho Gill on horseback on January 14.

Luisa Eva Gill (sister of Rubén) made the initial police report at the Viale police station for the family's disappearance. The case was labeled as a "missing persons investigation" and was left to justice Jorge Sebastián Gallino, from Nogoyá. In mid-2015, it was transferred to judge Gustavo Acosta.

== Investigation ==
In mid-2003, Justice Gallino ordered an investigation. No neighbor or relative was aware of what happened to the Gills, and that they had left on their own was unlikely: they had no vehicle of their own and Margarita, who had another job at the school in town, had not received her latest salary. In 2006, the Gill family's plaintiff lawyer, Elvio Garzón, stated that some police officers had intervened in their disappearance, who also provided services in police stations in the areas where the accountant Amado Abib and architect Mario Zappegno disappeared. This hypothesis was neither looked into nor recorded in the case file.

In 2008, a raid was carried out on the La Candelaria estancia, where the floor was raised, wells were dug out and traces of blood were found using luminol. Three human blood samples were recovered, without the Gills' genetic pattern, although experts made it clear that over time the samples had been contaminated. Furthermore, the presence of flies, which hover over human corpses, was noted. The area was monitored with an echo sounder in order to find traces of disturbed soil, but none were detected. In that same year, a "psychological autopsy" was conducted, through which a forensic psychologist concluded that the Gills had no psychological or religious motives which could lead them to sever ties with loved ones, and that while the family had little contact with other families in the area, Rubén was "a happy, loquacious, sociable man, who never looked sad." However, several witnesses reported that in the days before his disappearance, he had been "silent, thoughtful and very concerned". In November 2011, a search was performed on a well in the countryside, where the family resided.

During the investigation, authorities investigated leads in different Argentine provinces, as well as in Paraguay and Brazil, but to no avail. Among the different hypotheses, there was talk of a forced disappearance, a confrontation with a field owner and a sentimental conflict. Neither of these led to anything conclusive. They have not appeared in any registry, neither labor, immigration, educational or social security (although, in 2010, the Gills' names appeared on the enrollment for Universal Allocation Per Child, which was later found to be an error).

In 2015, the new justice, Gustavo Acosta, and prosecutor Federico Uriburu decided to restart the investigation. Uriburu made the following statement: The aim was to give more prominence to the case, as well as to involve police officers to work on it. Investigations were carried out in the Cordobán town of Porteña, a town of 5,000 inhabitants where a community of rural workers from Entre Ríos was formed, but no clues were found. In addition, a drone flew over the area in August 2015, photographing the La Candelaria estancia and surrounding fields in search of disturbed soil. An attempt was also made to find the aerial photos of the area in 2002, so they could compare them with the ones taken from the drone.

In February 2018, yet another search operation was carried out on the estancia, following a lead provided by rural contractor Armando Nanni, who said he had seen Rubén Gill complaining about the wells that he had been ordered to dig on January 14, days before his disappearance. A water well was also inspected, where only remains of animal bones were found. Likewise, Nanni indicated the existence of a stream on the land, which will be addressed when the budget is approved by the judiciary. A team of firefighters investigated it and indicated that perforations had been made in it, since the terrain was removed. Rubén's brother, Osvaldo, and Margarita's mother, Adelia, demanded that the basement of the estancia be investigated, since they alleged that Goette had covered it and built it upstairs.

=== Alfonso Goette's statements ===
The owner of the estancia hinted at the possibility that the family might have gone to Santa Fe to visit relatives, or have migrated to the northeast in search of work.

Goette claimed that the family had left all their possessions in the house, including money and documents, but when relatives of Gill visited the room, they could not find said belongings, but found that the mattresses were burned and blood was mixed with the dirt. According to Luisa Gill, Goette burned the mattresses because they were stained with blood. She also questioned the landlord's account, which claimed that he had given the Gills a vacation, since he had never given them more than ten to fifteen days before.

In addition, the fact that Goette did not notice the Gills' disappearance until three months later and that some acquaintances declared that the relationship between them was not good, suspicions fell on the owner. However, no compromising evidence has been located thus far.

Goette died in a car crash on June 16, 2016, at the age of 78. The truck he was driving steered out of control and overturned on Route 32, near the town of Seguí. With his death, the investigation of the death could be reopened. For this, a police commission has been formed.

== Family members ==
- Rubén "Mencho" Gill (56)
- Margarita Norma Gallegos (26)
- María Ofelia (12)
- Osvaldo José (9)
- Sofía Margarita (6)
- Carlos Daniel (4)

== See also ==
- List of people who disappeared mysteriously: post-1970
