= Segui (disambiguation) =

Segui or Seguí may refer to:

- Seguí, a village in Argentina
- Antonio Seguí (1934–2022), Argentine cartoonist, painter, engraver, book illustrator, and sculptor
- David Segui (born 1966), Diego Seguí's son, former MLB first baseman
- Diego Seguí (1937–2025), Cuban baseball player
