= 2023 Australia national soccer team season =

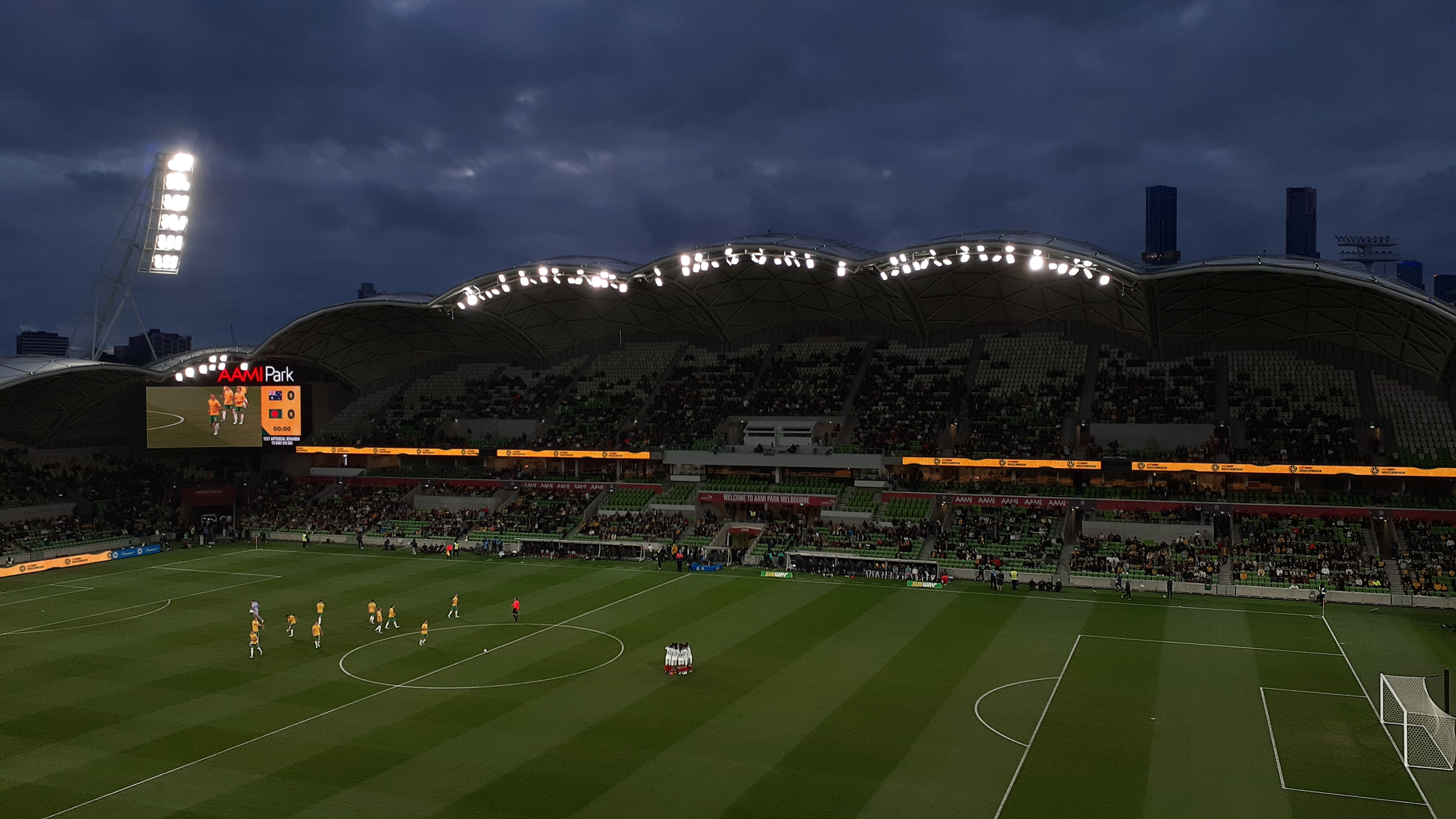
- Melbourne Rectangular Stadium before the Australia v Bangladesh match in November
- Season: 2023
- Manager: Graham Arnold
- Captain: Mathew Ryan
- Matches played: 8
- Wins: 4
- Draws: 1
- Losses: 3
- Goals scored: 16 (2 per match)
- Goals against: 8
- Top goalscorer: Harry Souttar (4)
- Most caps: Connor Metcalfe (8)
- Players: 45
- Goalscorers: 8
- Debutants: 10
- Biggest home win: Australia 7–0 Bangladesh (16 November)
- Biggest away win: Palestine 0–1 Australia (21 November)
- Highest scoring: Australia 7–0 Bangladesh (16 November)
- Longest winning run: 3 (17 October – 21 November)
- Longest unbeaten run: 3 (17 October – 21 November)
- Longest winless run: 4 (28 March – 13 October)
- Longest losing run: 2 (28 March – 15 June)
- Highest attendance: 27,103; Australia 1–2 Ecuador (28 March)
- Lowest attendance: 20,668; Australia 3–1 Ecuador (24 March)
- Average attendance: 22,882
Home colours	Away colours

This page summarises the Australia men's national soccer team fixtures and results in 2023.

== Summary ==
At the beginning of March 2023, Australia announced a two-game "welcome home" series, hosting friendly games against Ecuador in Sydney and Melbourne, to celebrate their 2022 FIFA World Cup campaign, planning to call-up the majority of the squad. Australia won the first match at CommBank Stadium 3–1, with Jackson Irvine scoring the first goal and assisting Awer Mabil for the second. The third goal was scored by Garang Kuol, marking his first international goal. During the match Aiden O'Neill and Alex Robertson made their international debuts. Ahead of the second match, Graham Arnold made seven changes to the squad, including starting goalkeeper Joe Gauci for his international debut. Australia took the lead with Brandon Borrello scoring his first international goal, but eventually lost 1–2, with Ecuador's Pervis Estupiñán scoring a penalty and Willian Pacho scoring a header. Arnold also substituted on Jordan Bos for his international debut. In mid-June, Australia played Argentina in a rematch of the World Cup Round of 16 match at Workers' Stadium in Beijing. Despite playing an impressive game, Australia lost 2–0 with Lionel Messi opening the scoring early for Argentina and Germán Pezzella heading in the second goal in the second half.

At the end of July 2023, the draw for the groups of the second round of the AFC 2026 World Cup qualifiers was conducted, with Australia drawn in Group I, together with Palestine, Lebanon, and the winner between Maldives and Bangladesh from the first round.

In September 2023, Australia played a friendly game against Mexico in Arlington, Texas. The match ended in a 2–2 draw after Harry Souttar with a header and Martin Boyle with a penalty gave Australia a 2–0 lead which was equalised by a penalty by Raúl Jiménez and a goal by César Huerta.

The following month, October, Australia played a couple of friendlies in London. The first one was in Wembley Stadium against England, a match they lost 0–1, with Ollie Watkins scoring the only goal. In the game Lewis Miller and Mohamed Toure made their debuts for Australia. The second match was the renewal of the Soccer Ashes against New Zealand. Australia won the match 2–0, with Souttar scoring the first and Irvine scoring the second. Despite being eligible for Italy and playing for them at youth level, Alessandro Circati made his debut for Australia, playing well and with composure.

In November, Australia played their first games of the second round of the qualification path for the 2026 World Cup. In the first match, they beat Bangladesh 7–0 in Melbourne, with Souttar and Borrello scoring a goal each, Mitchell Duke scoring a brace, and Jamie Maclaren scoring his second hat-trick for the national team. Also in the game, Kusini Yengi made his debut appearance for Australia. In the second match, Australia beat Palestine 1–0, with Souttar scoring the only goal with a header.

== Record ==
As of match played 21 November 2023

Type	GP	W	D	L	GF	GA
Friendly	6	2	1	3	8	8
World Cup qualifiers	2	2	0	0	8	0
Total	8	4	1	3	16	8

== Match results ==
=== Friendlies ===
This section is for matches confirmed by Football Australia, please do not add speculative fixtures.

24 March "Welcome Home" Series	Australia	3–1	Ecuador	Parramatta, Sydney, Australia
20:00 AEDT	Irvine 12'; Mabil 32'; Kuol 84'	Report	Torres 23'	Stadium: Western Sydney Stadium; Attendance: 20,668; Referee: Kim Dae-yong (South Korea)

28 March "Welcome Home" Series	Australia	1–2	Ecuador	Melbourne, Australia
19:30 AEDT	Borrello 16'	Report	Estupiñán 51' (pen.); Pacho 65'	Stadium: Marvel Stadium; Attendance: 27,103; Referee: Chae Sang-hyeop (South Korea)

15 June	Argentina	2–0	Australia	Beijing, China
20:00 UTC+8	Messi 2'; Pezzella 68'	Report		Stadium: Worker's Stadium; Attendance: 68,000; Referee: Ma Ning (China)

9 September	Mexico	2–2	Australia	Arlington, United States
21:00 UTC-5	Jiménez 69' (pen.); Huerta 83'	Report	Souttar 16'; Boyle 63' (pen.)	Stadium: AT&T Stadium; Referee: Rubio Vázquez (United States)

13 October	England	1–0	Australia	London, England
19:45 UTC+1	Watkins 57'	Report		Stadium: Wembley Stadium; Attendance: 81,116; Referee: Stéphanie Frappart (France)

17 October Soccer Ashes	Australia	2–0	New Zealand	London, England
19:45 UTC+1	Souttar 13'; Irvine 76'	Report		Stadium: Gtech Community Stadium; Attendance: 5,761; Referee: Stuart Attwell (England)

=== World Cup qualifiers ===
16 November Second round	Australia	7–0	Bangladesh	Melbourne, Australia
20:00 UTC+11	Souttar 4'; Borrello 20'; Duke 37', 40'; Maclaren 48', 70', 84'	Report		Stadium: AAMI Park; Attendance: 20,876; Referee: Ahrol Risqullaev (Uzbekistan)

21 November Second round	Palestine	0–1	Australia	Kuwait City, Kuwait (Note: Palestine played their home game at a neutral venue due to the Gaza war.)
17:00 UTC+3		Report	Souttar 18'	Stadium: Jaber Al-Ahmad International Stadium; Attendance: 14,537; Referee: Qasim Al-Hatmi (Oman)

== Player statistics ==
Correct as of 21 November 2023 (v. Palestine).
Numbers are listed by player's number in last match played

No.	Pos	Nat	Player	Total		Friendlies		World Cup qualifiers	
No.	Pos	Nat	Player	Apps	Goals	Apps	Goals	Apps	Goals
1	GK	(Australia) AUS	Mathew Ryan	7	0	5+0	0	2+0	0
12	GK	(Australia) AUS	Andrew Redmayne	0	0	0+0	0	0+0	0
12	GK	(Australia) AUS	Joe Gauci	1	0	1+0	0	0+0	0
18	GK	(Australia) AUS	Tom Glover	0	0	0+0	0	0+0	0
18	GK	(Australia) AUS	Ashley Maynard-Brewer	0	0	0+0	0	0+0	0
2	DF	(Australia) AUS	Miloš Degenek	3	0	2+1	0	0+0	0
2	DF	(Australia) AUS	Ryan Strain	4	0	1+2	0	1+0	0
3	DF	(Australia) AUS	Nathaniel Atkinson	2	0	2+0	0	0+0	0
3	DF	(Australia) AUS	Cameron Burgess	3	0	2+0	0	1+0	0
4	DF	(Australia) AUS	Kye Rowles	6	0	4+1	0	1+0	0
5	DF	(Australia) AUS	Thomas Deng	1	0	1+0	0	0+0	0
5	DF	(Australia) AUS	Jordan Bos	6	0	2+2	0	1+1	0
8	DF	(Australia) AUS	Bailey Wright	1	0	1+0	0	0+0	0
13	DF	(Australia) AUS	Alessandro Circati	1	0	1+0	0	0+0	0
16	DF	(Australia) AUS	Aziz Behich	6	0	3+1	0	1+1	0
16	DF	(Australia) AUS	Joel King	0	0	0+0	0	0+0	0
19	DF	(Australia) AUS	Harry Souttar	7	4	5+0	2	2+0	2
20	DF	(Australia) AUS	Lewis Miller	4	0	1+1	0	1+1	0
7	MF	(Australia) AUS	Samuel Silvera	2	0	0+2	0	0+0	0
8	MF	(Australia) AUS	Connor Metcalfe	8	0	4+2	0	2+0	0
10	MF	(Australia) AUS	Ajdin Hrustic	1	0	0+1	0	0+0	0
10	MF	(Australia) AUS	Denis Genreau	2	0	0+2	0	0+0	0
14	MF	(Australia) AUS	Riley McGree	3	0	3+0	0	0+0	0
14	MF	(Australia) AUS	Aiden O'Neill	7	0	2+3	0	0+2	0
17	MF	(Australia) AUS	Cameron Devlin	1	0	1+0	0	0+0	0
17	MF	(Australia) AUS	Keanu Baccus	7	0	5+0	0	2+0	0
21	MF	(Australia) AUS	Alexander Robertson	2	0	0+2	0	0+0	0
21	MF	(Australia) AUS	Massimo Luongo	2	0	1+0	0	0+1	0
22	MF	(Australia) AUS	Jackson Irvine	7	2	4+1	2	2+0	0
22	MF	(Australia) AUS	Gianni Stensness	0	0	0+0	0	0+0	0
25	MF	(Australia) AUS	Patrick Yazbek	0	0	0+0	0	0+0	0
6	FW	(Australia) AUS	Marco Tilio	2	0	0+2	0	0+0	0
6	FW	(Australia) AUS	Martin Boyle	4	1	3+0	1	1+0	0
7	FW	(Australia) AUS	Mathew Leckie	1	0	1+0	0	0+0	0
9	FW	(Australia) AUS	Jason Cummings	1	0	0+1	0	0+0	0
9	FW	(Australia) AUS	Jamie Maclaren	3	3	1+0	0	0+2	3
9	FW	(Australia) AUS	Nicholas D'Agostino	1	0	0+1	0	0+0	0
10	FW	(Australia) AUS	Kusini Yengi	1	0	0+0	0	0+1	0
11	FW	(Australia) AUS	Brandon Borrello	7	2	1+4	1	1+1	1
11	FW	(Australia) AUS	Awer Mabil	2	1	1+1	1	0+0	0
15	FW	(Australia) AUS	Nestory Irankunda	0	0	0+0	0	0+0	0
15	FW	(Australia) AUS	Mitchell Duke	7	2	5+0	0	2+0	2
21	FW	(Australia) AUS	Garang Kuol	2	1	0+2	1	0+0	0
23	FW	(Australia) AUS	Craig Goodwin	6	0	3+1	0	2+0	0
26	FW	(Australia) AUS	Mohamed Toure	1	0	0+1	0	0+0	0
