= Carlos González (footballer, born 1963) =

Argentine footballer

Personal information
- Full name: Carlos Alcides González
- Date of birth: 11 November 1963 (age 62)
- Place of birth: Seguí, Argentina
- Height: 1.77 m (5 ft 10 in)
- Position: Midfielder

Team information
- Current team: Paraguay (assistant coach)

Senior career*
| Years | Team | Apps | (Gls) |
| 1986 | Belgrano de Paraná | | |
| 1987–1990 | Unión Santa Fe | 85 | (16) |
| 1991–1992 | Cobreloa | 34 | (6) |
| 1993 | Deportes Iquique | 16 | (2) |
| 1994–1995 | Atlético Rafaela | | |
| 1995–1997 | Huracán Corrientes | 72 | (7) |
| 1997–2000 | Atlético Rafaela | | |

Managerial career
- 2001: Belgrano (assistant)
- 2001–2002: Olimpo (assistant)
- 2003–2004: Quilmes (assistant)
- 2005–2006: San Lorenzo (assistant)
- 2006–2008: Arsenal de Sarandí (assistant)
- 2008–2009: Rosario Central (assistant)
- 2009: Al-Ahli (assistant)
- 2010–2014: Arsenal de Sarandí (assistant)
- 2014–2015: Tigre (assistant)
- 2016–2017: Gimnasia LP (assistant)
- 2017–2018: Huracán (assistant)
- 2019: Boca Juniors (assistant)
- 2020–2022: Ecuador (assistant)
- 2023–2024: Costa Rica (assistant)
- 2024–: Paraguay (assistant)
- * Club domestic league appearances and goals

Carlos Alcides González (born 11 November 1963) is an Argentine former professional footballer who played as a midfielder for clubs of Argentina and Chile.

== Career ==
Born in Seguí, González began playing football with local sides Club Atlético Patronato, Club Atletico Belgrano and Atlético de Rafaela before turning professional with Unión de Santa Fe aged 24. In 1992, González was part of Cobreloa's Chilean Primera División-winning side.

After he retired from playing, González joined football manager Gustavo Alfaro's staff, working with him for over a decade, including two spells with Arsenal de Sarandí.

== Teams ==
- (Argentina) Belgrano de Paraná 1986
- (Argentina) Unión de Santa Fe 1987–1990
- (Chile) Cobreloa 1991–1992
- (Chile) Deportes Iquique 1993
- (Argentina) Atlético Rafaela 1994–1995
- (Argentina) Huracán de Corrientes 1995–1997
- (Argentina) Atlético Rafaela 1997–2000

== Titles ==
- (Chile) Cobreloa 1992 (Chilean Championship)
