= Alessandro Circati =

Australian soccer player (born 2003)

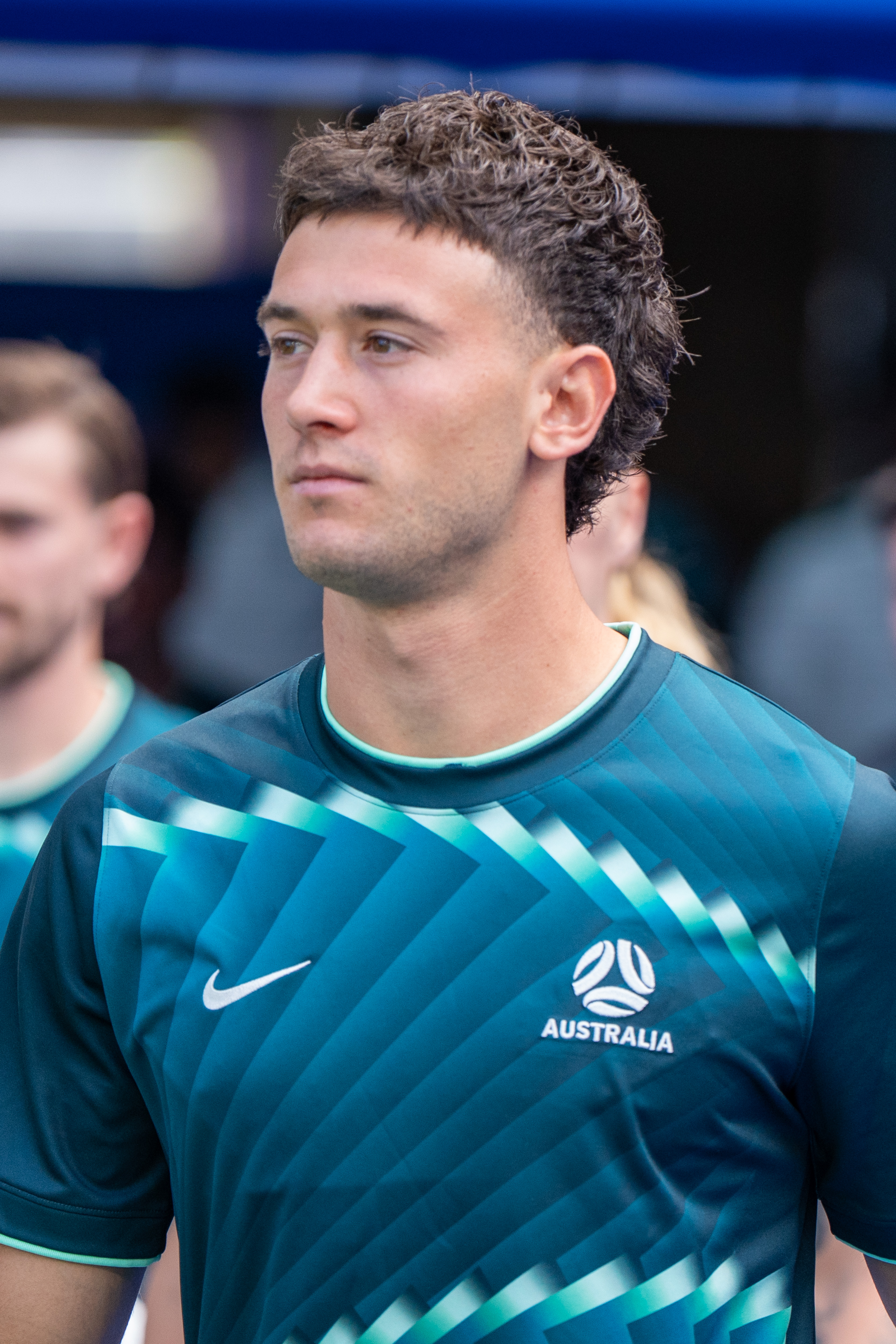
- Circati with Australia in 2026

Personal information
- Date of birth: 10 October 2003 (age 23)
- Place of birth: Fidenza, Italy
- Height: 1.90 m (6 ft 3 in)
- Position: Centre-back

Team information
- Current team: Benfica
- Number: 3

Youth career
- 2014–2016: Perth SC
- 2017–2021: Perth Glory
- 2021–2022: Parma

Senior career*
Years	Team	Apps	(Gls)
2019–2021	Perth Glory NPL	21	(1)
2021–2026	Parma	87	(2)
2026–	Benfica	5	(0)

International career^{‡}
2022	Italy U20	2	(0)
2023–	Australia	17	(2)
- * Club domestic league appearances and goals as of 8 November 2026 ‡ National team caps and goals as of 1 October 2026

Alessandro Circati (Italian: [alesˈsandro tʃirˈkaːti]; born 10 October 2003) is a professional soccer player who plays as a centre-back for Primeira Liga club Benfica. Born in Italy and a former youth international for Italy, he plays for and has captained the Australia national team. He is considered one of the best Australian players of his generation.

== Early life ==
Circati was born in Fidenza, Italy, to Gianfranco Circati, who was a professional footballer. Born in the province of Parma and Emilia-Romagna region of Italy, his grandparents resided in Salsomaggiore Terme and originated from the region. Circati moved to Perth, Australia at the age of one. As a youth during school, Circati played football and Australian rules football, although focussed more on the former as he was "okay" at Aussie rules. He attended Servite College during high school and idolised Paolo Maldini. Circati began his football career at Perth SC until the age of 14 when he moved to the academy system of Perth Glory, a club where his father previously played.

== Club career ==
=== Perth Glory ===
Circati played for Perth Glory in the National Premier Leagues (NPL) youth competitions in Western Australia. Since joining in 2017, he was part of the under-20s team that claimed the league title and the State League Reserves Cup in the 2019 season, winning the cup final against Cockburn City at Dorrien Gardens.

Circati played for the NPL senior squad mid-season of 2019 and scored his first senior goal against Sorrento FC on 15 July 2019. He also played in the A-League Youth competition for Perth Glory although his side finished last by the end of the campaign with no wins. By the end of the 2020 season, Circati received Most Glorious Youth Player Award by Perth Glory at the club's award ceremony, recognising his performances whilst playing with the academy.

=== Parma ===
Circati underwent trials with several European clubs, including Leicester and Reading in England, where he spent three months before having to move on due to the complications brought about by Brexit. According to reports, Leicester were considering making an offer to the young player, but due to his Italian passport and young age, finalising a deal proved to be difficult. Influenced by his father and the connection to his hometown, Circati joined Parma on 10 March 2021 after a successful trial period with the club. On 10 January 2022, Circati was announced to have signed his first professional contract, a two-year contract expiring in 2024, with Parma.

Displaying consistent performances in the youth sector, Circati was promoted to train with the first team, sharing a dressing room with experienced Italian international Gianluigi Buffon, who served as a mentor to him when he first joined the club. On 26 February 2022, Circati made his professional debut for Parma, starting and keeping a clean sheet in a 4–0 win against SPAL in Serie B. In the 2021–22 season, he made a total of 6 league appearances and 2 assists in the games against Cosenza and Alessandria. On 8 June, Circati renewed his contract with Parma, tying him to the club until the end of the 2026–27 season. In the 2022–23 season, Circati made 17 appearances for Parma across all competitions.

Circati scored his first professional goal on 24 September 2023 in a 1–1 draw to Sampdoria, extending Parma's 16-game unbeaten streak during the 2023–24 Serie B season. In that season, Parma earned promotion to Serie A, the first time since the 2020–21 season, and progressed to the Round of 16 in the Coppa Italia. Circati made 32 appearances and one goal across all competitions.

=== Benfica ===
On 19 August 2026, Circati joined Primeira Liga club Benfica for an undisclosed fee, signing a contract until 2031. Circati became the first Australian to sign for Benfica's first team, following several Australians, including Paul Okon-Engstler, who had previously appeared for the club's academy sides.

== International career ==
=== Italy ===
Circati, being of dual Australian and Italian nationality, received offers from both countries to represent them in international football. In March 2022, Circati was selected by Italy U20s for two friendly matches against Germany and Norway. On 28 March, he made his debut against Norway as a starter and helped keep a clean sheet in a 5–0 win for the Azzurri. In September 2022, he was called up to the Italy U21 squad alongside Australian-born player Cristian Volpato. He was an unused substitute in the friendly against Japan on 26 September 2022.

=== Australia ===
On 6 June 2023, after talks with Graham Arnold and a phone call with his family, Circati made the decision to represent Australia rather than Italy, rejecting the Gli Azzurrini call-up to their youth team. He was added to the 23-man squad set to play against Argentina in Beijing, and was settled into the squad by Mathew Ryan. However, Circati was an unused substitute in two friendlies with the Socceroos, sitting on the bench in the matches against Argentina and Mexico (on 12 September).

Circati made his debut on 18 October 2023 in a Soccer Ashes friendly match against New Zealand at the Brentford Community Stadium. He played a part in the opening goal scored by Harry Souttar and kept a clean sheet in the process as Australia won 2–0 over their rivals. Circati made his competitive debut on 11 June 2024 in a 5–0 win against Palestine in the 2026 FIFA World Cup qualification.

On 9 September 2025, Circati was named in the starting lineup for the second leg of the 2025 Soccer Ashes as captain, in just his 7th appearance for the Socceroos. In the process he became the Socceroos' fourth youngest captain and the youngest since 1981. Circati revealed in a press conference during the Soccer Ashes series that former Italian goalkeeper Gianluigi Buffon played a key role in helping him choose to play for Australia over Italy.

Circati scored his first international goal on 31 March 2026 against Curaçao during the 2026 FIFA Series at the AAMI Park.

Circati was included in Australia's squad for the 2026 FIFA World Cup. Circati played every minute of Australia's World Cup campaign as the Socceroos finished second in their group. Australia were eliminated in the round of 32 after a 1–1 draw with Egypt, losing in a penalty shootout. Circati was one of only two Australian players, alongside Harry Souttar, to play every minute of the nation's World Cup campaign.

== Personal life ==
Following Circati's transfer to Benfica in 2026, Perth Glory's "Most Glorious Academy Player" award was named the Alessandro Circati Medal, in recognition of his junior roots at the club as he became their biggest ever export.

== Career statistics ==
=== Club ===
As of match played 8 November 2026

Club	Season	League			Cup		Other		Total	
Club	Season	Division	Apps	Goals	Apps	Goals	Apps	Goals	Apps	Goals
Perth Glory Youth	2019	NPL WA	9	1	—		—		9	1
Perth Glory Youth	2020	NPL WA	12	0	—		—		12	0
Perth Glory Youth	Total		21	1	—		—		21	1
Parma	2021–22	Serie B	6	0	0	0	—		6	0
Parma	2022–23	Serie B	15	0	2	0	1	0	18	0
Parma	2023–24	Serie B	29	1	3	0	—		32	1
Parma	2024–25	Serie A	6	0	1	0	—		7	0
Parma	2025–26	Serie A	31	1	2	0	—		33	1
Parma	2026–27	Serie A	—		1	0	—		1	0
Parma	Total		87	2	9	0	1	0	96	2
Benfica	2026–27	Primeira Liga	5	0	1	0	5	0	11	0
Career total			112	3	10	0	6	0	128	2

=== International ===
As of match played 29 September 2026

Appearances and goals by national team and year
National team	Year	Apps	Goals
Australia
Australia	2023	1	0
Australia	2024	3	0
Australia	2025	5	0
Australia	2026	9	2
Total		18	2

List of international goals scored by Alessandro Circati
No.	Date	Venue	Cap	Opponent	Score	Result	Competition
1	31 March 2026	Melbourne Rectangular Stadium, Melbourne, Australia	11	Curaçao	2–1	5–1	2026 FIFA Series
2	29 September 2026	Lang Park, Brisbane, Australia	18	Brazil	1–1	2–4	Friendly

== See also ==
- List of Australia international soccer players born outside Australia

== Honours ==
Parma

- Serie B: 2023–24

Australia

- Soccer Ashes: 2023, 2025
