= Cristian Volpato =

Australian soccer player (born 2003)

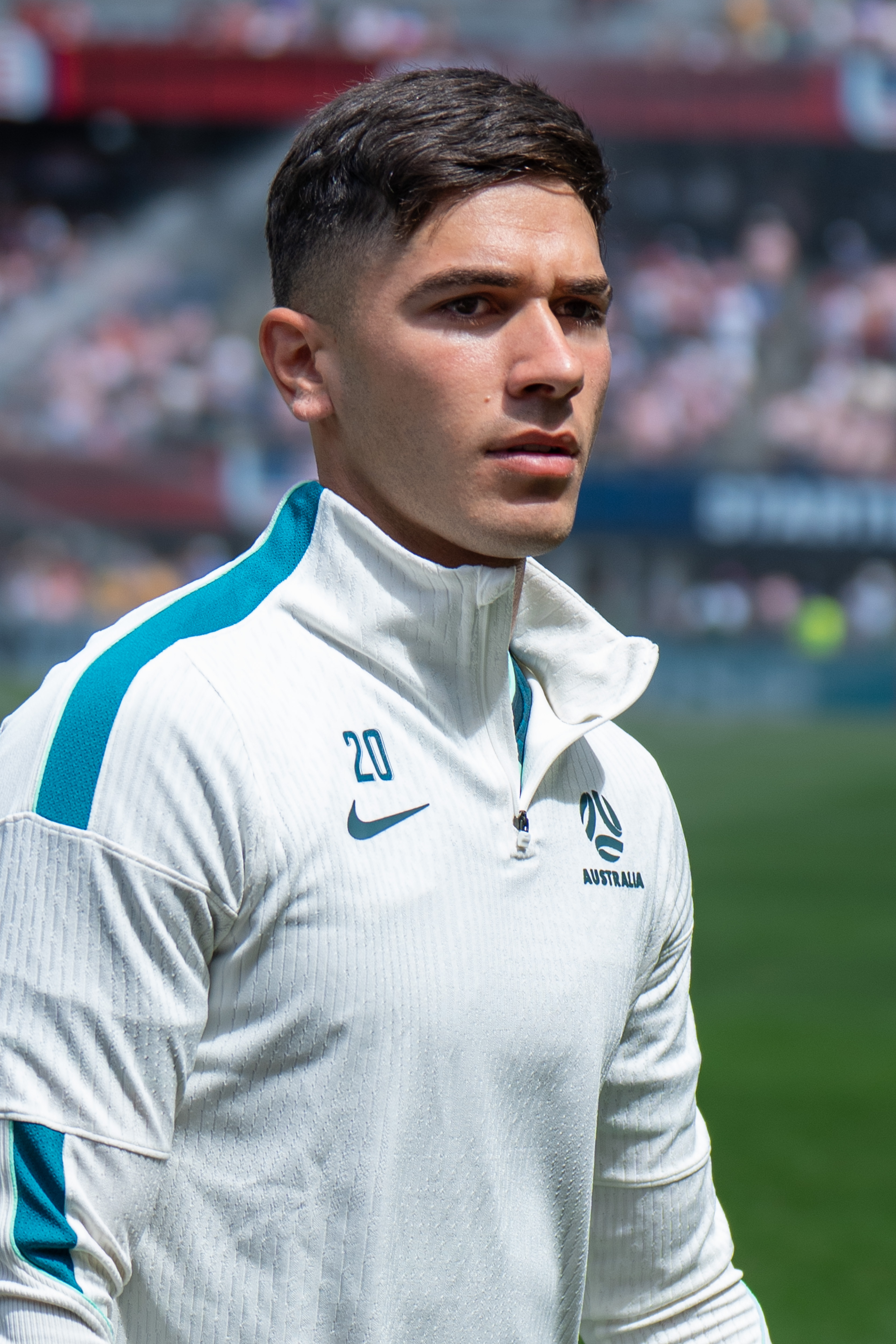
- Volpato with Australia in 2026

Personal information
- Date of birth: 15 November 2003 (age 22)
- Place of birth: Camperdown, New South Wales, Australia
- Positions: Attacking midfielder; winger

Team information
- Current team: Sassuolo
- Number: 7

Youth career
- 2013–2015: Sydney United
- 2016–2018: Sydney FC
- 2018–2020: Western Sydney Wanderers
- 2020–2022: Roma

Senior career*
Years	Team	Apps	(Gls)
2021–2023	Roma	10	(2)
2023–	Sassuolo	66	(8)

International career^{‡}
2022	Italy U19	4	(2)
2022–2023	Italy U20	7	(2)
2022–2025	Italy U21	9	(1)
2026–	Australia	4	(0)
- * Club domestic league appearances and goals as of 29 August 2026 ‡ National team caps and goals as of 3 July 2026

Cristian Volpato (born 15 November 2003) is an Australian professional football player who plays as an attacking midfielder or winger for Serie A club Sassuolo and the Australia national team.

== Early life and education ==
Cristian Volpato was born on 15 November 2003 in Camperdown, New South Wales, a suburb of the Inner West in Sydney. He is of Italian descent from grandparents on both sides, Veneto on paternal and Campania on maternal. Both of his parents were born in Australia. Volpato attended the prestigious rugby school St Joseph's College, Hunters Hill.

== Club career ==
=== Youth career ===
Volpato first started playing football in Abbotsford, a suburb of Sydney, where he was a prolific goalscorer. This allowed him to take his first steps into professional football at Andrea Icardi's AC Milan Soccer School, Sydney FC and the Western Sydney Wanderers academy. He soon earned a trial in the AS Roma Youth Sector through Fabrizio Piccareta.

After a few months in Rome where Volpato showed his attacking abilities, he signed a three-year contract with the club from the Italian capital in January 2020. He also joined Francesco Totti's agency one month later despite having taken the number 10 shirt with Roma's Youth.

One year later, Volpato signed his first professional contract with Roma, a new three-year contract tying him to the club until 2024. As the youth competitions were cancelled due to the COVID-19 pandemic in Italy, he became a regular with the under-18, scoring five goals during the 2020–21 season before earning a place in the under-19 squad.

=== Roma ===
On 4 December 2021, Volpato made his professional debut for Roma at the age of 18 in a Serie A match lost 3–0 against Inter Milan. On 19 February 2022, Volpato scored his first Serie A goal in a match drawn 2–2 against Hellas Verona.

After making his debut in the UEFA Europa League with Roma, Volpato made his first league appearance the following season on 31 October 2022, coming on as a substitute for Nicolò Zaniolo at the 57th minute of the match against Hellas Verona. On said occasion, he scored a goal and assisted Stephan El Shaarawy for another one, helping Roma obtain a 3–1 victory.

=== Sassuolo ===
After few days of negotiation, on 29 June 2023, Volpato signed a contract to Sassuolo, after completing a €7.5 million transfer which included a 15% future resale fee. The transfer is the third highest fee for an Australian player.

Volpato scored his first goal for Sassuolo against Bologna on 3 February 2024.

== International career ==
Volpato is a dual citizen of both Australia and Italy. He is eligible to represent either country at international level due to FIFA eligibility rules that state a soccer player can represent a nation if at least one parent or grandparent was born in a country other than their birthplace, and Volpato fulfills the criteria due to his grandparents being Italians.

=== Italy ===
In early August 2021, Volpato was called by Carmine Nunziata to the Italy national under-19 team, but was forced to forfeit a few days later. In June 2024, Volpato took part in the Maurice Revello Tournament in France with Italy.

=== Australia ===
"I spoke to Cristian [Volpato] yesterday three times. [...] I pretty much told him yesterday that he was in the 26-man squad. [...] He came back last night and declined the offer to come and play for Australia at the World Cup. That's his decision at the end of the day."

— Australia national team manager Graham Arnold on Volpato declining the offer to represent Australia at the 2022 FIFA World Cup

On 12 December 2021, it was reported that Australia national team coach Graham Arnold was considering calling up Volpato for the upcoming 2022 FIFA World Cup qualification against Vietnam and Oman. He was also called up to the Australia U23 team, but Roma withdrew him from the squad. In March 2022, following Australia's 2–0 loss against Japan, Volpato posted an image on his Snapchat story poking fun at the team, leading to many fans calling him as "childish" and "immature". With Australia announcing their World Cup squad on 8 November, Arnold disclosed that Volpato had been offered a spot there, but rejected the opportunity.

In May 2026, Volpato was called up for Australia's 2026 World Cup squad, effectively ending debate over his national team selection. On 6 June, Volpato made his debut for Australia as a starter in a friendly match against Switzerland that ended in a 1–1 draw, only to be replaced by Connor Metcalfe at half-time.

== Style of play ==
Volpato can play both as a midfielder or a winger. Seen as a regista or deep-lying playmaker in his early career, he is often compared to Francesco Totti, his model who wore No. 10 shirt as an AS Roma soccer player and direct mentor in his first year with said club.

== Personal life ==
In the morning of 24 July 2026, The Guardian reported that Volpato was booked by New South Wales police for speeding a second time in two hours and tested positive for cocaine. Subsequent tests cleared Volpato of cocaine usage.

== Career statistics ==
=== Club ===
As of match played 29 August 2026

Appearances and goals by club, season and competition
Club	Season	League			Coppa Italia		Europe		Total	
Club	Season	Division	Apps	Goals	Apps	Goals	Apps	Goals	Apps	Goals
Roma	2021–22	Serie A	3	1	0	0	0	0	3	1
Roma	2022–23	Serie A	7	1	1	0	3 (Note: Appearances in UEFA Europa League)	0	11	1
Roma	Total		10	2	1	0	3	0	14	2
Sassuolo	2023–24	Serie A	22	1	3	0	—		25	1
Sassuolo	2024–25	Serie B	18	4	3	0	—		21	4
Sassuolo	2025–26	Serie A	24	2	2	0	—		26	2
Sassuolo	2026–27	Serie A	2	1	1	1	—		3	2
Sassuolo	Total		66	8	9	1	0	0	75	9
Career total			76	10	10	1	3	0	89	11

=== International ===
As of match played 3 July 2026

Appearances and goals by national team and year
National team	Year	Apps	Goals
Australia	2026	4	0
Total		4	0

== Honours ==
- Roma: 2022–23 UEFA Europa League runner-up
- Sassuolo: 2024–25 Serie B
