= Gianfranco Circati =

Italian footballer

Personal information
- Date of birth: 2 February 1971 (age 55)
- Place of birth: Fidenza, Italy
- Height: 1.91 m (6 ft 3 in)
- Positions: Defender; striker

Senior career*
| Years | Team | Apps | (Gls) |
| 1989–1990 | Parma | 0 | (0) |
| 1990–1991 | Siracusa | 26 | (0) |
| 1991–1992 | Modena | 24 | (1) |
| 1992–1993 | Ravenna | 4 | (0) |
| 1993 | Modena | 0 | (0) |
| 1993–1994 | Salernitana | 46 | (0) |
| 1994–1995 | Parma | 0 | (0) |
| 1995 | Salernitana | 0 | (0) |
| 1995–1996 | Savoia | 25 | (0) |
| 1996–1997 | Cosenza | 22 | (0) |
| 1997–1998 | Fiorenzuola | | |
| 1998–1999 | Perth Glory | 15 | (2) |
| 1999–2000 | Ternana | | |
| 2000–2002 | Cagliari | 27 | (0) |
| 2002–2003 | Padova | 28 | (0) |
| 2003–2004 | Varese | | |
| 2004–2005 | Foggia | | |
| 2006–2010 | Perth SC | | |
- * Club domestic league appearances and goals

Gianfranco Circati (Italian: [tʃirˈkaːti]; born 2 February 1971) is an Italian former footballer.

Circati played for a number of teams in Italian football with the majority of his career being in Serie B and Serie C, though he did have a stint in Serie A with Parma F.C.

== Personal life ==
His son Alessandro, currently plays for Benfica and the Australia men's national soccer team. He has also played for Perth SC and Parma, and was at Perth Glory's academy, all of which were Gianfranco's former clubs.
