= Seguí =

Coordinates: 31°57′S 60°08′W

- Municipality and village
- Interactive map of Seguí
- Country: Argentina
- Province: Entre Ríos Province
- Time zone: UTC−3 (ART)

Seguí is a village and municipality in Entre Ríos Province in north-eastern Argentina.

== Culture ==
Writer Leandro R. Puntin was raised and has residence in this town.
