= Paul Okon-Engstler =

Australian soccer player (born 2005)

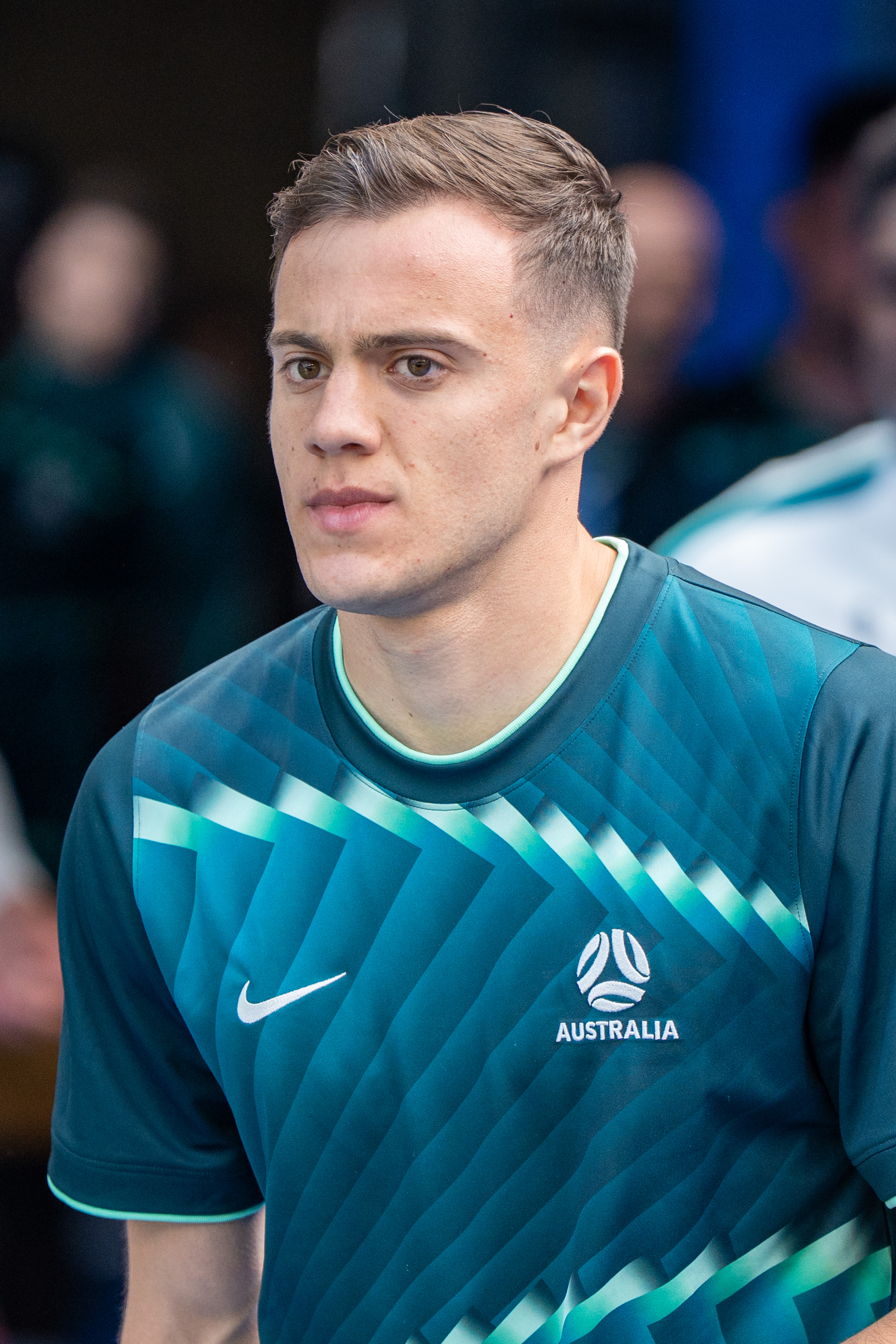
- Okon-Engstler with Australia in 2026

Personal information
- Full name: Paul Michael Junior Okon-Engstler
- Date of birth: 24 January 2005 (age 21)
- Place of birth: Ostend, Belgium
- Height: 1.86 m (6 ft 1 in)
- Position: Defensive midfielder

Team information
- Current team: 1. FC Köln
- Number: 23

Youth career
- Marconi Stallions
- 2018: Western Sydney Wanderers
- 2019–2022: Club Brugge
- 2022–2024: Benfica

Senior career*
Years	Team	Apps	(Gls)
2024–2025	Benfica B	8	(0)
2025–2026	Sydney FC	27	(0)
2026–	1. FC Köln	7	(0)

International career^{‡}
2023–2025	Australia U20	17	(0)
2024–	Australia U23	2	(0)
2025–	Australia	12	(0)
Medal record
Men's football
Representing Australia
WAFF U-23 Championship
Runner-up	2024 Saudi Arabia
AFC U-20 Asian Cup
Winner	2025 China	Team
- * Club domestic league appearances and goals as of 1 November 2026 ‡ National team caps and goals as of 29 September 2026

Paul Michael Junior Okon-Engstler (born 24 January 2005), also known as Paul Okon Junior (Note: "Junior" can be shortened to "Jnr" or "Jr".) or Paul Okon-Engstler, is a Australian professional soccer player who plays as a defensive midfielder for Bundesliga club 1. FC Köln and the Australia national team.

== Early life ==
Paul Michael Junior Okon-Engstler was born on 24 January 2005 in Ostend, Belgium to Paul Okon and Yaimara Okon. His father is of German and Italian descent and was born in Sydney, Australia and raised in the suburb of Bossley Park. Paul was a professional soccer player and represented the Australia national team. His mother is of Cuban descent and her family resided in Miami, Florida.

His family moved to Australia in 2006 when his father signed for A-League Men club Newcastle Jets from his hometown club KV Oostende. As a child, Okon-Engstler grew up with three younger brothers in Cecil Hills, a suburb in Western Sydney, and started playing soccer at the age of five. Like his father, Okon-Engstler started his soccer career with Marconi Stallions before he moved to Western Sydney Wanderers in their youth setup. His family moved back to Belgium when him and his brothers signed for Club Brugge in 2019.

== Club career ==
=== Benfica ===
In July 2022, Okon-Engstler signed for Primeira Liga club Benfica on a three-year contract. For the 2022–23 season, he made 30 appearances for the youth team in the Campeonato Nacional de Juniores (Junior National Championship) and Liga Revelação. For the 2023–24 season, he was included in the squad that took part in the UEFA Youth League. Benfica exited in the group stage with a third place finish, and was later knocked out in the cup stage of the Taça Revelação during the season.

In the 2024–25 season, Okon-Engstler was included in Benfica B squad for Liga Portugal 2. He made eight league appearances. Okon-Engstler made his debut off the bench on 10 August 2024 in a 2–1 loss to Leixões. He was sent off three minutes into his debut for a challenge on André Simões in the 72nd minute of the match. At the end of the season, Benfica B finished fourth on the table and tied with their best-ever finish in the team's history.

=== Sydney FC ===
In July 2025, Okon-Engstler signed for A-League side Sydney FC on a three-year deal for his first season in professional soccer. He made his debut against Western United in the opening round of the 2025 Australia Cup. The 2025–26 season saw Okon-Engstler register 30 appearances and two assists in all competitions. In his league debut at home, he was praised for a "man of the match" performance in the win over Central Coast Mariners. He recorded his first assist in a 2–0 win against Macarthur FC on 9 November.

In December, he was ruled out with a quad injury. He returned to the line-up in the away match against Melbourne City on 3 January 2026. Sydney FC finished fifth in the regular season, and reached the Grand Final against Auckland FC. Okon-Engstler started for his side in the 1–0 loss to Auckland. At the end of the season, Okon-Engstler was named in the A-League Men Team of the Season, along with teammate Harrison Devenish-Meares. He was also awarded the club's Player of the Year in May.

=== 1. FC Köln ===
In July 2026, Okon-Engstler signed for Bundesliga club 1. FC Köln on a four year deal with a fee reported around €1 million ($1.64 million). On 24 August, he made his debut off the bench in a 3–2 win over Würzburger Kickers in the first round of the DFB-Pokal. Five days later, he earned his first start in a 3–2 win against Hoffenheim in the first league game of the season.

== International career ==
Okon-Engstler is eligible to represent Australia through his father and Cuba through his mother. He holds Italian citizenship. In September 2022, he was called up to the Australia under-20 team, but did not feature. He made his debut for the Australia under-23 team during the 2023 Maurice Revello Tournament. In June 2025, Okon-Engstler was called up for the Socceroos squad for qualifiers against Japan and Saudi Arabia.

On 31 May 2026, Okon-Engstler was selected in the 26-man squad for the 2026 FIFA World Cup. In the opening match of Group D, he recorded one assist in the 2–0 win over Turkey.

== Career statistics ==
=== Club ===
As of 1 November 2026

Club	Season	League			Cup		Continental		Total	
Club	Season	Division	Apps	Goals	Apps	Goals	Apps	Goals	Apps	Goals
Benfica B	2024–25	Liga Portugal 2	8	0	—		—		8	0
Sydney FC	2025–26	A-League Men	27	0	3	0	—		30	0
1. FC Köln	2026–27	Bundesliga	6	0	2	0	—		8	0
Career total			41	0	5	0	0	0	46	0

=== International ===
As of match played 29 September 2026

Appearances and goals by national team and year
National team	Year	Apps	Goals
Australia	2025	2	0
Australia	2026	10	0
Total		12	0

== Honours ==
Australia U-23

- WAFF U-23 Championship: runner-up 2024

Australia U-20

- AFC U-20 Asian Cup: 2025
