= Connor Metcalfe =

Australian soccer player (born 1999)

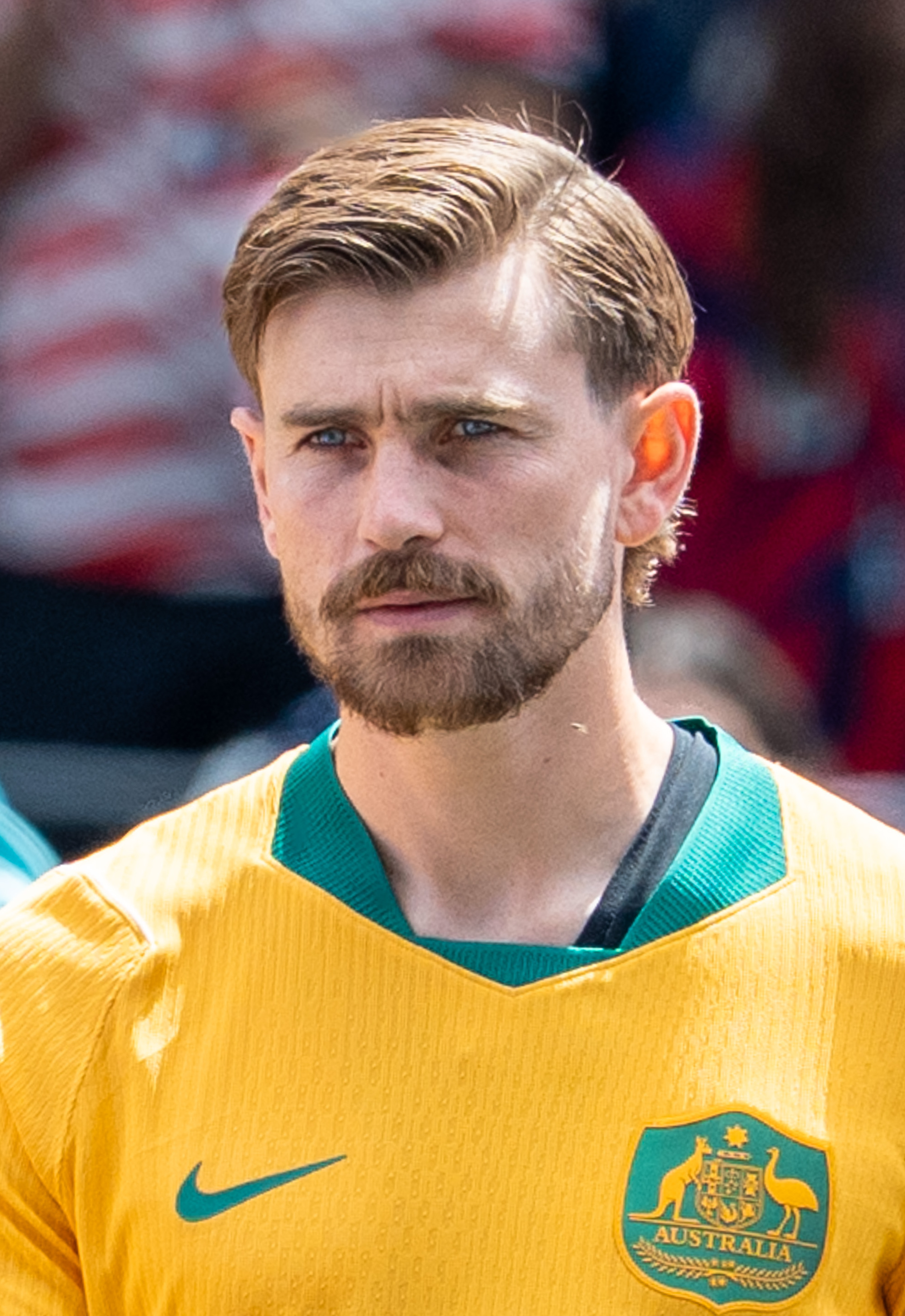
- Metcalfe with Australia in 2026

Personal information
- Full name: Connor Isaac Metcalfe
- Date of birth: 5 November 1999 (age 27)
- Place of birth: Newcastle, New South Wales, Australia
- Height: 1.83 m (6 ft 0 in)
- Position: Central midfielder

Team information
- Current team: FC St. Pauli
- Number: 24

Youth career
- South Cardiff
- NNSW NTC
- FFV NTC
- 2014–2017: Melbourne City

Senior career*
Years	Team	Apps	(Gls)
2017–2019	Melbourne City NPL	32	(3)
2017–2022	Melbourne City	73	(9)
2022–	FC St. Pauli	102	(6)

International career^{‡}
2018	Australia U20	3	(0)
2020–2021	Australia Olympic	9	(0)
2021–	Australia	42	(3)
Medal record
Men's football
Representing Australia
AFC U-23 Asian Cup
Third place	2020 Thailand	U-23 Team
- * Club domestic league appearances and goals as of 20:30, 23 October 2026 (UTC) ‡ National team caps and goals as of 29 September 2026

Connor Isaac Metcalfe (born 5 November 1999) is an Australian professional soccer player who plays as a central midfielder for 2. Bundesliga club FC St. Pauli and the Australia national team.

== Club career ==
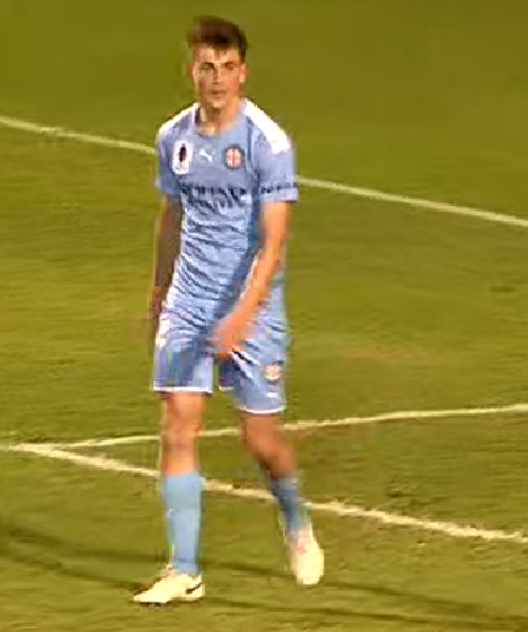
Metcalfe playing for Melbourne City at the 2019 FFA Cup

Having joined Melbourne City's youth system in 2014, Metcalfe first trained with the senior team during the 2016–17 season. On 18 July 2017, he came into the Melbourne City squad by a scholarship. He made his first appearance coming on as a substitute in a 2–2 draw against Central Coast Mariners for Nathaniel Atkinson.

On 6 March 2021, Metcalfe scored a brace in Melbourne City's 6–0 away win over City rivals Melbourne Victory.

He was voted in the Professional Footballers Australia's A-League's Team of the Season in June 2021. In August, he was awarded the Harry Kewell Medal, the award for Australia's men's young player of the year, for the 2020–21 season.

In February 2022, it was announced Metcalfe would join 2. Bundesliga club FC St. Pauli in the summer. He agreed to a three-year deal with the German side.

== International career ==
In October 2018, Metcalfe was called up to the Australia U20 squad to compete in the 2018 AFC U-19 Championship held in Indonesia. He made his international debut for the senior national team on 7 June 2021 in a World Cup Qualifier against Chinese Taipei.

On 31 May 2026, Metcalfe was selected in the 26-man squad for the 2026 FIFA World Cup. He scored Australia's second goal in a 2–0 win over Turkey, in their opening group game.

== Career statistics ==
=== Club ===
As of match played 23 October 2026

Appearances and goals by club, season and competition
Club	Season	League			National cup		Continental		Other		Total	
Club	Season	Division	Apps	Goals	Apps	Goals	Apps	Goals	Apps	Goals	Apps	Goals
Melbourne City NPL	2017	NPL Victoria 2	12	1	—		—		—		12	1
Melbourne City NPL	2018	NPL Victoria 2	20	2	—		—		—		20	2
Melbourne City NPL	Total		32	3	—		—		—		32	3
Melbourne City	2017–18	A-League	1	0	0	0	—		—		1	0
Melbourne City	2018–19	A-League	5	0	0	0	—		—		5	0
Melbourne City	2019–20	A-League	16	2	5	1	—		2 (Note: Appearances in Finals Series play-offs)	0	23	3
Melbourne City	2020–21	A-League	24	5	0	0	—		—		24	5
Melbourne City	2021–22	A-League	22	2	2	1	4	0	3	0	31	3
Melbourne City	Total		68	9	7	2	4	0	5	0	84	11
FC St. Pauli	2022–23	2. Bundesliga	30	3	1	0	—		—		31	3
FC St. Pauli	2023–24	2. Bundesliga	30	3	3	0	—		—		33	3
FC St. Pauli	2024–25	Bundesliga	10	0	0	0	—		—		10	0
FC St. Pauli	2025–26	Bundesliga	25	0	2	0	—		—		27	0
FC St. Pauli	2026–27	2. Bundesliga	7	0	1	0	—		—		8	0
FC St. Pauli	Total		102	6	7	0	0	0	0	0	109	6
Career total			202	18	14	2	4	0	5	0	225	20

=== International ===
As of match played 29 September 2026

Appearances and goals by national team and year
National team	Year	Apps	Goals
Australia	2021	2	0
Australia	2022	3	0
Australia	2023	8	0
Australia	2024	11	0
Australia	2025	8	1
Australia	2026	10	2
Total		42	3

Scores and results list Australia's goal tally first, score column indicates score after each Metcalfe goal.

List of international goals scored by Connor Metcalfe
No.	Date	Venue	Opponent	Score	Result	Competition
1	10 June 2025	King Abdullah Sports City, Jeddah, Saudi Arabia	Saudi Arabia	1–1	2–1	2026 FIFA World Cup qualification
2	13 June 2026	BC Place, Vancouver, Canada	Turkey	2–0	2–0	2026 FIFA World Cup
3	29 September 2026	Lang Park, Brisbane, Australia	Brazil	2–1	2–4	Friendly

== Honours ==
Melbourne City

- A-League Premiership: 2020–21

FC St. Pauli

- 2. Bundesliga: 2023–24

Individual

- Harry Kewell Medal: 2021
- A-League PFA Team of the Season: 2020−21, 2021–22
