= Women in the Parliament of Afghanistan =

Females in the Afghan Parliament

Women were able to be members in the Parliament of Afghanistan from the United States invasion of Afghanistan until the Fall of Kabul in 2021. Since then those who were elected have gone into hiding, many fleeing the country entirely. Many of them were recognised as part of the BBC's 100 Women in 2021.

== History ==
There were 69 elected in the 2018 parliamentary election, but most of them currently reside in Greece as refugees. They live in Athens in exile.

== List ==
- Elay Ershad
- Fawzia Koofi
- Farzana Kochai
- Mursal Nabizada
