= Kochai =

Kochai is a surname. Notable people with the surname include:

- Abdul Qayyum Kochai (born 1937), Afghan diplomat
- Farzana Kochai (born 1991/92), Afghan activist and politician
- Jamil Jan Kochai (born 1992), Afghan-American writer
