= Nabizada =

Nabizada is an Afghan surname. Notable people with the surname include:

- Latifa Nabizada (born 1969), Afghan helicopter pilot
- Khushnood Nabizada (born 1987), Afghan journalist, diplomat, peace campaigner, and entrepreneur
- Mursal Nabizada (1991–2023), Afghan politician, women's rights activist, lawmaker and critic of the Taliban
- Amin Nabizada (born 2007), Afghan footballer
