= Ahmad Javid Jaihoon =

Afghan businessman and politician

- جاوید جیحون

Member and Vice President of the Wolesi Jirga (House of the People)
- In office 2018–2021

Co-founder, Afghan United Bank
- In office 2007–Now

Owner of Ghori Cement Factory
- In office 2016–Now

Personal details
- Born: 1980 (age 45–46) Kabul, Afghanistan
- Party: Independent
- Occupation: Businessman, Politician
- Website: https://www.afghanunitedbank.com/

Ahmad Javid Jaihoon (born 1980), also known as Lala Javid, is an Afghan businessman, entrepreneur and politician. He is the founder and owner of Jaihoon Group of Companies (JJGC), a major trading and fuel transportation conglomerate operating across Afghanistan and the region. Jaihoon served as a Member of the Wolesi Jirga (Afghan Parliament) representing Kabul after winning a parliamentary seat in the 2018 elections with 7,161 votes. He was later elected as a Deputy Speaker of the Wolesi Jirga.

== Early life and education ==
Ahmad Javid Jaihoon was born in 1976 in Kabul, Afghanistan, to a Tajik family. He spent his early childhood in Kabul, where economic hardship and political instability shaped his formative years. According to a 2018 *Reuters* report, Jaihoon grew up in a modest environment and worked from a young age to support his household. He began his work life selling cups of water and bananas on the streets of Kabul, an experience he later referred to as the foundation of his business resilience and entrepreneurial mindset.

During Afghanistan's post-2001 reconstruction era, Jaihoon—like a number of emerging Afghan businessmen—took advantage of newly opened commercial opportunities amidst a rapidly expanding economy fueled by international investment. Reuters notes that he belonged to a generation of self-made entrepreneurs who rose to economic prominence during the early years after the Taliban regime fell, as Western funds and private contracts entered Afghanistan with relatively low regulatory oversight.

Despite coming from a low-income background, he gradually expanded his activities into trade and logistics and later into large-scale fuel supply, banking, and cement production. In interviews, Jaihoon has emphasized that hard work rather than wealth or social status shaped his career, famously stating that "'Lala Javid' himself is a brand known all over the country," highlighting his transformation from a street vendor to a prominent Afghan businessman.

== Business career ==
Jaihoon has been active in Afghanistan's private sector with a focus on energy, fuel logistics and regional trade. His businesses have operated in the supply and transportation of hydrocarbon products, including diesel, petrol and aircraft fuel, as well as in the installation of oil pipelines, fuel storage facilities and the provision of armored vehicle services. The Jaihoon Group of Companies has maintained commercial links with several regional and international markets, including Tajikistan, Kazakhstan, Kyrgyzstan, Russia, Uzbekistan, Turkmenistan, the United Arab Emirates and the United States.

The company manages a pipeline route from Tajikistan to Sher Khan Bandar linking to its fuel storage site, alongside a fleet of tankers used for internal fuel distribution in Afghanistan. Since 2002, Jaihoon's business activities have included cross-border energy trade and logistics operations connected to fuel transport in Afghanistan.

Jaihoon has also held stakes in financial and industrial ventures, including Afghan United Bank and the Ghori Cement Plant. His involvement in these sectors includes participation in banking ownership processes and management of industrial capacity, based on publicly available reports and government documentation.

=== Ghori Cement Plant Case ===
In 2016, Jaihoon purchased the shares of Afghan Investment Company (AIC), the operating body of the Ghori Cement Plant. The project faced long-standing disputes since 2006 regarding fees and contractual compliance. In 2017, the Afghan government cancelled the contract, a decision Jaihoon described as political, claiming he had invested nearly $60 million, created 1,500 jobs, and restored the plant to near full capacity.

=== Afghan United Bank ===
In 2007, Jaihoon co-founded Afghan United Bank (AUB) as a private financial institution aimed at modernizing Afghanistan's banking sector. Under his involvement and leadership initiatives within the Jaihoon Group, the bank expanded its services to corporate and retail clients, developed digital banking programs, and opened multiple branches across the country. Despite economic challenges in Afghanistan, AUB grew into one of the recognized private banks, known for promoting investment, trade financing, and business development.

== Political career ==
Jaihoon entered politics as a parliamentary candidate in Kabul in 2010. He later won a seat in the 2018 Afghan Parliament elections, representing Kabul with 7,161 votes. During his time in parliament, he participated in the election for the Speaker of the House in 2019, competing against Mir Afghan Safi and Abdul Shakoor Waqif Hakimi. In the runoff vote, Safi received 88 votes and Jaihoon secured 76 votes, but neither reached the required majority, leaving the leadership position unresolved and prolonging the parliamentary deadlock.
