= Mursal Nabizada =

Afghan politician (1991–2023)

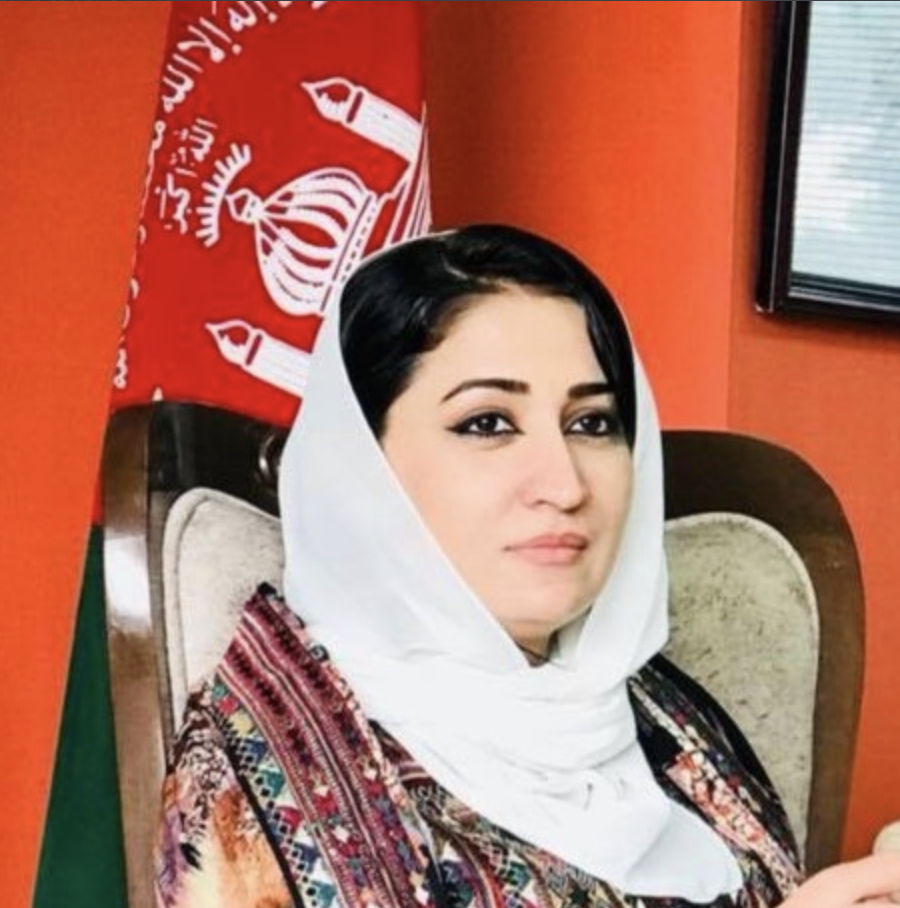
- Nabizada in her role with the Afghan Parliament

Member of the House of the People
- In office 2019–2021
- Constituency: Kabul

Personal details
- Born: c. 1991 Nangarhar Province, Afghanistan
- Died: 15 January 2023 (aged 32) Kabul, Afghanistan
- Cause of death: Assassination by gunshot

Mursal Nabizada (Pashto: مرسل نبی زادہ; c. 1991 – 15 January 2023) was an Afghan politician, women's rights activist, lawmaker and critic of the Taliban who served as a Member of the House of the People from Kabul. Nabizada was killed in Kabul in January 2023 by the Taliban.

== Career ==
Nabizada was elected to the House of the People, the lower chamber of the National Assembly, to represent Kabul in the 2018 Afghan parliamentary election. She was elected as a Parliamentary Defense Commissioner in the Wolesi Jirga where she received a total of 1,396 votes. The inaugural session of the term was held on 29 June 2019. She served in the National Assembly until the Taliban takeover of Afghanistan in August 2021, and was one of the few female members of parliament who stayed in Kabul after the takeover.

Outside parliament, she worked for the Institute for Human Resources Development and Research. She was also an active member of the Inter-Parliamentary Union (IPU). She attended many conferences such as one in New York in 2020 hosted by the IPU.

In December 2022 the Taliban issued a statute denying women access to participate in public spheres of work such as non-governmental organizations, university matriculation, and were barred from being employed. Nabizada was a strong critic of the gender apartheid in Afghanistan and was an advocate against the forced marriage of women and girls.

== Personal life ==
Nabizada was born in Nangarhar Province, Afghanistan in the Arzaan Qemat neighborhood of District 12. Nabizada received her bachelor's degree from Balkh University in Northern Afghanistan.

== Death ==
At around 3:00 am on 15 January 2023, Nabizada was shot to death on the first floor of her home in Kabul, along with one of her personal bodyguards named Ismail, by unknown assailants. She was 32. Her brother and a security guard were injured. Another security guard fled with money and jewelry. Her murder was the first of a Member of Parliament since the 2021 Taliban takeover. The Taliban targeted former members of the National Resistance Front and opposition figures in Parliament who supported the intervention of the United States in Afghanistan where Mursal Nabizada's and six hundred others were murdered.

Before her death, Nabizada was given a humanitarian visa to try and escape Afghanistan, however despite being given the opportunity to leave she did stayed in Afghanistan in protest of the fear tactics carried out by the Taliban. Mariam Solaimankhil stated, "a true trailblazer – a strong, outspoken woman who stood for what she believed in, even in the face of danger. Despite being offered the chance to leave Afghanistan, she chose to stay and fight for her people." "According to the complainant [filed by the IPU for the violations of human rights], Nabizada had previously expressed concerns to fellow members of parliament living in exile in Afghanistan that she had been repeatedly threatened and harassed by an unidentified senior intelligence official from the Taliban Ministry of Interior Affairs. The official reportedly told her that he intended to coerce her into marriage. Nabizada claimed she refused to give in to those threats of forced marriage." She was an advocate against the forced marriage of women and girls, her work mainly addressed the gender apartheid in Afghanistan.

Four months prior to Nabizada's death in October 2022, the Canadian Parliament worked to help other women seeking asylum out of Afghanistan, specifically nine other women members of Afghanistan's Parliament. The Canadian Parliament proposed a motion to grant transportation and asylum for nine women to evacuate Afghanistan as they faced significant risks as women fighting for justice in Afghanistan against the Taliban. After Nabizada's death, the Canadian Parliament promised to help bring 40,000 Afghan refugees from Afghanistan and grant them asylum Canada by the end of 2023.

== Investigation ==
Police officers Khalid Zadran and Police Chief Molvi Hamidullah Khalid were the officials in charge of the investigation of Nabizada's death. However, Antonio Gutierre a secretary general for the United Nations, made a statement arguing that the Taliban is acting with complete impunity towards women and suggests seeking an independent investigation. A statement was released by the UK Parliament regarding Nabizada's death stating they, "strongly condemn the actions of their killers." In this statement, the UK Parliament would like to create a plan to help other women escape Afghanistan safely. This statement was signed by a total of 17 UK Parliament members.
