= 2026–27 Watford F.C. season =

English football team season

Watford
2026–27 season
- Owner: Gino Pozzo
- Chairman: Scott Duxbury
- Head coach: Alessio Dionisi (until 22 November)
- Stadium: Vicarage Road

The 2026–27 season is the 128th season in the history of Watford and their fifth consecutive season in the Championship. The club are participating in the Championship, the FA Cup, and the EFL Cup.

== Managerial changes ==
Prior to the season starting, Alessio Dionisi was appointed as the new head coach on a two-year contract.. Following a 4-0 defeat to Sheffield United, Dionisi departed his role as Head Coach, leaving the club in 21st and 5 points off the bottom 3 as well as 3 wins in 13 matches

== Transfers and contracts ==
=== In ===
Date	Pos.	Player	From	Fee	Ref.
16 July 2026	RB	(Germany) Omar Traoré	(Italy) Udinese	Free transfer	
24 July 2026	CF	(Spain) Iker Bravo	(Italy) Udinese	£3,400,000	
24 July 2026	CF	(Denmark) Luca Kjerrumgaard	(Italy) Udinese	Undisclosed	
31 July 2026	CM	(Argentina) Martín Payero	(Italy) Udinese	£3,400,000	
31 July 2026	GK	(Italy) Federico Ravaglia	(Italy) Bologna	Undisclosed	
12 August 2026	GK	(England) Sam Walker	(England) Bradford City	Undisclosed	
1 September 2026	CF	(Netherlands) Myron Boadu	(Netherlands) PSV Eindhoven	Free	
11 September 2026	CF	(Jamaica) Michail Antonio	(Qatar) Al-Sailya	Free	
1 October 2026	RWB	(Senegal) Krépin Diatta	Monaco	Free	

=== Out ===
Date	Pos.	Player	To	Fee	Ref.
3 July 2026	GK	(England) Nathan Baxter	(England) Leyton Orient	Undisclosed	
6 July 2026	CAM	(Georgia (country)) Giorgi Chakvetadze	(Italy) Udinese	Undisclosed	
22 July 2026	CDM	(Nigeria) Tom Dele-Bashiru	(Greece) Aris Thessaloniki	£425,000	
14 August 2026	RB	(France) Jeremy Petris	(Greece) Aris Thessaloniki	£1,680,000	
15 August 2026	RW	(Australia) Nestory Irankunda	(Portugal) Sporting CP	£15,000,000	
28 August 2026	CM	(Morocco) Imrân Louza	(Greece) Panathinaikos	£7,000,000	
28 August 2026	CM	(England) Amar Sanghrajka	(England) Queens Park Rangers	Undisclosed	

=== Loaned in ===
Date	Pos.	Player	From	Loaned until	Ref.
2 August 2026	LB	(Zimbabwe) Jordan Zemura	(Italy) Udinese	End of Season	
1 September 2026	CB	(France) Soumaïla Coulibaly	(France) Strasbourg	End of Season	
1 September 2026	LW	(England) Stephy Mavididi	(England) Leicester City	End of Season	
1 September 2026	CB	(Croatia) Branimir Mlačić	(Italy) Udinese	End of Season	

=== Loaned out ===
Date	Pos.	Player	To	Loaned until	Ref.
23 June 2026	CF	(Colombia) Jorge Hurtado	(Colombia) Deportes Tolima	End of Season	
16 July 2026	CF	(Portugal) Vivaldo Semedo	(Portugal) Alverca	End of Season	
17 July 2026	RB	(England) Conrad Hunt	(Northern Ireland) Coleraine	6 October 2026 (Note: On 6 October, Hunt was recalled from his initial season-long loan at Coleraine, and subsequently joined Farnham Town.)	
3 August 2026	CB	(England) Joshua Mullins	(England) Wealdstone	31 August 2026	
4 August 2026	GK	(England) Alfie Marriott	(England) Chelmsford City	4 January 2027	
7 August 2026	CB	(England) Tom Georgiou	(England) Berkhamsted	6 January 2027	
8 August 2026	LW	(England) Remiero Moulton	(England) Worthing	7 September 2026	
13 August 2026	GK	(Norway) Egil Selvik	(France) Brest	End of Season (Note: Includes an obligation to make the move permanent)	
21 August 2026	CF	(England) Kash Odiase	(England) Chelmsford City	21 September 2026	
1 September 2026	RW	(England) Michael Adu-Poku	(Wales) Newport County	End of Season	
3 September 2026	CF	(England) Max Smith	(England) Oxford City	31 October 2026 (Note: On 2 October, Smith's initial one-month loan at Oxford City was extened by a further month.)	
4 September 2026	CDM	(England) Leo Ramirez-Espain	(England) Hemel Hempstead Town	30 December 2026 (Note: On 2 October, Ramirez-Espain's initial one-month loan at Hemel Hempstead Town was extended until the end of the calendar year.)	
5 September 2026	GK	(Sweden) Jonathan Macaulay	(England) Aldershot Town	2 October 2026	
18 September 2026	GK	(England) Sebastian Thrussell	(England) Maldon & Tiptree	13 October 2026	
21 September 2026	CDM	(England) Jai-Dea Moulton	(England) St Albans City	19 October 2026	
25 September 2026	CM	(England) Tobi Akinyimika	(England) St Albans City	21 October 2026	
25 September 2026	GK	(England) Sam Morris	(England) Uxbridge	3 January 2027	
25 September 2026	LW	(England) Remiero Moulton	(England) Dagenham & Redbridge	24 December 2026	
25 September 2026	GK	(England) Finlay Murray	(England) Egham Town	29 September 2026	
2 October 2026	GK	(Sweden) Jonathan Macaulay	(England) Tamworth	27 November 2026 (Note: On 30 October, Macaulay's initial one-month loan at Tamworth was extended by 28 days.)	
6 October 2026	RB	(England) Conrad Hunt	(England) Farnham Town	2 November 2026	
30 October 2026	CF	(England) Kash Odiase	(England) Chesham United	27 November 2026	
7 November 2026	LB	(England) Tomiwa Akinyimika	(England) Kingstonian	7 December 2026	
7 November 2026	GK	(England) Finlay Murray	(England) Leverstock Green	7 December 2026	

=== Released / Out of Contract ===
Date	Pos.	Player	Subsequent club	Joined date	Ref.
30 June 2026	CF	(England) Jonathan Lawson	(Finland) FF Jaro	13 July 2026	
30 June 2026	RW	(England) Tom Ince	(England) Tranmere Rovers	27 July 2026	
30 June 2026	CDM	(Senegal) Nampalys Mendy	(France) Metz	31 July 2026	
30 June 2026	CB	(England) Ian Kamga	(Portugal) Tondela	18 August 2026	
30 June 2026	CF	(England) Tobi Adeyemo	(England) Barnsley	15 October 2026	
30 June 2026	CM	(England) Hayden Barrett			
30 June 2026	CM	(Belgium) Pierre Dwomoh			
30 June 2026	LW	(England) Josh Keyes			
30 June 2026	GK	(England) Myles Roberts			
30 June 2026	RW	(Ukraine) Kristian Shevchenko			

=== New Contract ===
Date	Pos.	Player	Expiration	Ref.
22 May 2026	CDM	(Nigeria) Tom Dele-Bashiru	30 June 2027	
22 May 2026	CF	(England) Jack Grieves	30 June 2027	
22 May 2026	CM	(Democratic Republic of the Congo) Edo Kayembe	30 June 2027	
17 July 2026	LB	(England) Tomiwa Akinyimika	30 June 2027 (Note: First professional contract) (Note: Option of another year)	
17 July 2026	GK	(South Africa) Roraigh Browne	30 June 2027	
17 July 2026	RB	(England) Conrad Hunt	30 June 2027	
17 July 2026	CDM	(England) Jai-Dea Moulton	30 June 2027	
17 July 2026	RW	(England) Kymani Smith Daley	30 June 2027	
17 July 2026	GK	(England) Sebastian Thrussell	30 June 2027	
11 August 2026	LB	(England) Marc Bola	30 June 2030	

== Pre-season and friendlies ==
On 14 January, Watford confirmed their first pre-season friendly against Hansa Rostock to celebrate the German side's 60th anniversary. Two further friendlies were confirmed by the club in May, against Boreham Wood and Barnet. On 18 June, it was announced that Fiorentina would visit during pre-season. It was then confirmed by the club that Watford participated in a behind-closed-doors friendly against Brentford F.C..

Win Draw Loss Fixtures

11 July 2026 Friendly	Boreham Wood	2–1	Watford	Borehamwood
15:00 BST	White 18'; Trialist 84'	Report	Doumbia 56'	Stadium: Meadow Park

15 July 2026 Friendly	Barnet	2–2	Watford	Edgware
19:45 BST	Lakin 38'; Noel-Williams 64'	Report	Massiah-Edwards 40'; Kjerrumgaard 83'	Stadium: The Hive Stadium

25 July 2026 Friendly	Watford	3–0	Hansa Rostock	Watford
14:00 BST	Maamma 7'; Nabizada 18'; Chikovani 90+1'	Report		Stadium: Vicarage Road

29 July 2026 Friendly	Watford	0−1	Fiorentina	Watford
19:30 BST		Report	Piccoli 38'	Stadium: Vicarage Road

1 August 2026 Friendly	Brentford	0–1	Watford	Osterley
12:00 BST		Report	Kjerrumgaard (pen.)	Stadium: Brentford F.C. Training Ground; Attendance: 0 (BCD)

== Competitions ==
=== Overall record ===
Competition	First match	Last match	Starting round	Record							
Competition	First match	Last match	Starting round	Pld	W	D	L	GF	GA	GD	Win %
Championship	August 2026		Matchday 1	11	3	2	6	10	19	−9	27.27
FA Cup	January 2027		Third round	0	0	0	0	0	0	+0	—
EFL Cup	8 August 2026	25 August 2026	Second round	2	1	0	1	2	5	−3	50.00
Total				13	4	2	7	12	24	−12	30.77

Last updated: 17 October 2026
Source: Soccerway

=== Championship ===
==== League table ====
Pos	Team	Pld	W	D	L	GF	GA	GD	Pts	Promotion, qualification or relegation
19	Charlton Athletic	16	4	5	7	14	25	−11	17	
20	Lincoln City	16	4	3	9	15	27	−12	15	
21	Watford	16	4	3	9	13	27	−14	15	
22	Burnley	15	1	7	7	22	31	−9	10	Relegation to EFL League One
23	Derby County	16	2	4	10	14	32	−18	10	Relegation to EFL League One

Updated to match(es) played on 21 November 2026. Source: EFL Official Website
Rules for classification: 1) Points; 2) Goal difference; 3) Number of goals scored; 4) Head-to-head results; 5) Wins; 6) Away goals; 7) Penalty points (sec 9.5); 8) Number of 12-point sending off offences; 9) Play-off (only if needed to determine promotion/relegation)

==== Results summary ====
Overall								Home						Away					
Pld	W	D	L	GF	GA	GD	Pts	W	D	L	GF	GA	GD	W	D	L	GF	GA	GD
15	4	3	8	13	23	−10	15	4	2	2	9	9	0	0	1	6	4	14	−10

Last updated: 7 November 2026.
Source: Soccerway

==== Results by round ====
Round	1	2	3	4	5	6	7	8	9	10	11	12	13	14	15	16	17	18	19	20	21	22	23	24	25	26	27	28	29	30	31	32	33
Ground	H	A	H	A	A	H	H	A	H	A	H	A	A	H	H	A	H	A	H	A	A	H	A	H	H	A	H	A	A	H	A	H	H
Result	W	D	D	L	L	W	L	L	L	L	W	L	L	W	D																		
Position	8	6	9	14	18	12	17	20	20	22	20	21	21	20	20																		
Points	3	4	5	5	5	8	8	8	8	8	11	11	11	14	15																		

Source: Soccerway
A = Away; H = Home; W = Win; D = Draw; L = Loss; P = Postponed

==== Matches ====
On 25 June, the Championship fixtures were revealed.

Win Draw Loss Fixtures

16 August 2026 1	Watford	2–1	Southampton	Watford
13:30 BST	Kyprianou (yellow card) 8'; Bravo 12'; Pollock (yellow card) 13'; Nabizada 29', (yellow card) 43'; Doumbia (yellow card) 72'; Maamma (yellow card) 74'; Payero (yellow card) 84'	Report	Larin (yellow card) 14', (goal) 56'; Bree (yellow card) 18'; Downes (yellow card) 74'	Stadium: Vicarage Road; Attendance: 19,542 (2,313 away); Referee: Matt Donohue

22 August 2026 2	Wrexham	1–1	Watford	Wrexham
15:00 BST	Imray 22'; Broadhead (yellow card) 20'; Whiteman (yellow card) 72'	Report	Kjerrumgaard 14'	Stadium: Racecourse Ground; Attendance: 10,502; Referee: John Busby

29 August 2026 3	Watford	1–1	West Ham United	Watford
15:00 BST	Bove (yellow card) 7'; Nabizada 19'; Maamma (yellow card) 24'; Keben (yellow card) 49'		Pollock 27' (o.g.); Veltman (yellow card) 31'	Stadium: Vicarage Road; Attendance: 20,976; Referee: Robert Madley

1 September 2026 4	Swansea City	2–0	Watford	Landore
19:45 BST	Eom Ji-sung 8'; Idah 29'	Report	Traoré (yellow card) 25'; Kyprianou (yellow card) 68'; Keben (yellow card) 80'; Zemura (yellow card) 90+1'	Stadium: Swansea.com Stadium; Attendance: 16,195; Referee: Edward Duckworth

5 September 2026 5	West Bromwich Albion	1–0	Watford	West Bromwich
15:00 BST	Morgan (yellow card) 34', (goal) 36'; Diakité (yellow card) 42'; Phillips (yellow card) 88'; Whitwell (yellow card) 89'; Price (yellow card) 90+5'	Report	Payero (yellow card) 16'; Kayembe (yellow card) 63'; Bravo (yellow card) 90+5'	Stadium: The Hawthorns; Attendance: 24,800; Referee: Michael Salisbury

8 September 2026 6	Watford	2–1	Preston North End	Watford
19:45 BST	Kayembe 69'; Doumbia 76'	Report	Lang 5'; Andrija Vukčević (yellow card) 62'; Gibson (yellow card) 67'	Stadium: Vicarage Road; Referee: Farai Hallam

12 September 2026 7	Watford	1–2	Stoke City	Watford
15:00 BST	Bravo (yellow card) 19'; Nabizada 90+1', (yellow card) 90+3'	Report	Soumaré (yellow card) 33'; McGlynn 45+4'; Bocat 57'; Hirst (yellow card) 82'	Stadium: Vicarage Road; Attendance: 18,296; Referee: Lewis Smith

18 September 2026 8	Bristol City	1–0	Watford	Ashton Gate
20:00 BST	Ballard 31'; Williams (yellow card) 54'; Knight (yellow card) 54'		Doumbia (yellow card) 21'; Nabizada (yellow card) 25'; Mlačić (yellow card) 54'; Kayembe (yellow card) 54'; Pollock (yellow card) 81'	Stadium: Ashton Gate Stadium; Attendance: 20,906; Referee: Oliver Langford
Note: Fixture was initially scheduled for 19 September, but was rescheduled to the night before for live Sky Sports broadcasting.

10 October 2026 9	Watford	0–4	Burnley	Watford
15:00 BST			Larsen 13'; Amdouni 19'; Hatate 25'; Edwards 87'	Stadium: Vicarage Road; Referee: Andy Madley

13 October 2026 10	Cardiff City	5–1	Watford	Leckwith
19:45 BST	Moylan 11' (pen.), 35'; Pollock 41' (o.g.); Tanner 45+5'; Willock (penalty missed) 65'; Robinson 85'; Ng (yellow card) 86'	Report	Payero (yellow card) 9'; Kayembe (yellow card) 73'; Nabizada (yellow card) 86'; Kyprianou 87', (yellow card) 90+5'	Stadium: Cardiff City Stadium; Attendance: 17,921; Referee: John Busby

17 October 2026 11	Watford	2–0	Charlton Athletic	Watford
12:30 BST	Boadu (yellow card) 17'; Bravo (yellow card) 31'; Kjerrumgaard 58'; Zemura (yellow card) 79', (goal) 90+4'	Report	McNamara (yellow card) 10'; Skipp (yellow card) 32'; Campbell (yellow card) 44'; Coventry (yellow card) 47'; Mwamba (yellow card) 90+2'	Stadium: Vicarage Road; Attendance: 18,031; Referee: Thomas Bramall
Note: Fixture was initially scheduled for a 15:00 kick-off, but was brought forward for live Sky Sports broadcasting.

24 October 2026 12	Wolverhampton Wanderers	1–0	Watford	Wolverhampton
15:00 BST	Armstrong 35'; Trippier (yellow card) 41'; Doyle (yellow card) 79'; Bueno (yellow card) 87'; Sá (yellow card) 88'	Report	Bravo (yellow card) 41'; Kyprianou (yellow card) 49'; Zemura (yellow card) 74'	Stadium: Molineux Stadium; Attendance: 29,973; Referee: Bobby Madley

31 October 2026 13	Norwich City	3–2	Watford	Norwich
12:30 GMT	Chrisene 53'; Musaba 62'; Córdoba (yellow card) 63'; Maghoma 71'	Report	Boadu 10', 27'; Pollock (yellow card) 41'	Stadium: Carrow Road; Attendance: 25,811; Referee: Ben Speedie
Note: Fixture was initially scheduled for a 15:00 kick-off, but was brought forward for live Sky Sports broadcasting.

3 November 2026 14	Watford	1–0	Lincoln City	Watford
19:45 GMT	Mavididi 46', (yellow card) 50'; Keben (yellow card) 56'; Mlačić (yellow card) 80'; Kayembe (yellow card) 88'; Kyprianou (yellow card) 90'	Report	House (yellow card) 57'; Bradley (yellow card) 88'	Stadium: Vicarage Road; Attendance: 15,641; Referee: James Bell

7 November 2026 15	Watford	0–0	Middlesbrough	Watford
15:00 GMT	Traoré (yellow card) 71'	Report	Brittain (yellow card) 21'; Byram (yellow card) 43'; Berhalter (yellow card) 59'	Stadium: Vicarage Road; Attendance: 18,170; Referee: Gavin Ward

21 November 2026 16	Sheffield United	v	Watford	Sheffield
15:00 GMT				Stadium: Bramall Lane

25 November 2026 17	Watford	v	Blackburn Rovers	Watford
19:45 GMT				Stadium: Vicarage Road

28 November 2026 18	Derby County	v	Watford	Derby
15:00 GMT				Stadium: Pride Park Stadium

5 December 2026 19	Watford	v	Millwall	Watford
12:30 GMT				Stadium: Vicarage Road
Note: Fixture was initially scheduled for a 15:00 kick-off, but was brought forward for live Sky Sports broadcasting.

8 December 2026 20	Birmingham City	v	Watford	Bordesley
19:45 GMT				Stadium: St Andrew's @ Knighthead Park

12 December 2026 21	Queens Park Rangers	v	Watford	Shepherd's Bush
12:30 GMT				Stadium: MATRADE Loftus Road
Note: Fixture was initially scheduled for a 15:00 kick-off, but was brought forward for live Sky Sports broadcasting.

19 December 2026 22	Watford	v	Bolton Wanderers	Watford
12:30 GMT				Stadium: Vicarage Road
Note: Fixture was initially scheduled for a 15:00 kick-off, but was brought forward for live Sky Sports broadcasting.

26 December 2026 23	Portsmouth	v	Watford	Milton
15:00 GMT				Stadium: Fratton Park

29 December 2026 24	Watford	v	Wolverhampton Wanderers	Watford
19:45 GMT				Stadium: Vicarage Road

1 January 2027 25	Watford	v	Queens Park Rangers	Watford
15:00 GMT				Stadium: Vicarage Road

17 January 2027 26	Charlton Athletic	v	Watford	Charlton
12:00 GMT				Stadium: The Valley
Note: Fixture was initially scheduled for 16 January, but was pushed back a day for live Sky Sports broadcasting.

23 January 2027 27	Watford	v	Norwich City	Watford
15:00 GMT				Stadium: Vicarage Road

26 January 2027 28	Lincoln City	v	Watford	Lincoln
19:45 GMT				Stadium: ProAmpac Stadium

30 January 2027 29	Middlesbrough	v	Watford	Middlesbrough
15:00 GMT				Stadium: Riverside Stadium

6 February 2027 30	Watford	v	Sheffield United	Watford
12:30 GMT				Stadium: Vicarage Road
Note: Fixture was initially scheduled for a 15:00 kick-off, but was brought forward for live Sky Sports broadcasting.

13 February 2027 31	Stoke City	v	Watford	Stoke-on-Trent
15:00 GMT				Stadium: bet365 Stadium

17 February 2027 32	Watford	v	Cardiff City	Watford
20:00 GMT				Stadium: Vicarage Road
Note: Fixture was initially scheduled for 16 February, but was pushed back a day for live Sky Sports broadcasting.

20 February 2027 33	Watford	v	Bristol City	Watford
12:30 GMT				Stadium: Vicarage Road
Note: Fixture was initially scheduled for a 15:00 kick-off, but was brought forward for live Sky Sports broadcasting.

=== FA Cup ===
Win Draw Loss Fixtures

=== EFL Cup ===
Watford were drawn at home Crawley Town in the first round and to Peterborough United in the second round.

Win Draw Loss Fixtures

8 August 2026 First round	Watford	1–0	Crawley Town	Watford
15:00 BST	Bove (yellow card) 24'; Bravo (yellow card) 63'; Bola 90+9'	Report	Barker (yellow card) 62'; Gordon (yellow card) 67'; Aderoju (yellow card) 90+7'	Stadium: Vicarage Road; Attendance: 6,907; Referee: Harry Wager

25 August 2026 Second round	Watford	1–5	Peterborough United	Watford
19:45 BST	Doumbia 73'		Clarridge 10' (o.g.); Leonard 23', 51'; Shofowoke 55'; Jones 64'	Stadium: Vicarage Road; Attendance: 7,978; Referee: Isaac Searle

== Statistics ==
=== Appearances and goals ===
As of match played 7 November 2026

Players with no appearances are not included on the list; italics indicate loaned in player

No.	Pos	Nat	Player	Total		Championship		FA Cup		EFL Cup	
No.	Pos	Nat	Player	Apps	Goals	Apps	Goals	Apps	Goals	Apps	Goals
1	GK	(Italy) ITA	Federico Ravaglia	16	0	15+0	0	0+0	0	1+0	0
3	DF	(France) FRA	Soumaïla Coulibaly	5	0	4+1	0	0+0	0	0+0	0
4	DF	(Cameroon) CMR	Kévin Keben	16	0	14+0	0	0+0	0	1+1	0
5	MF	(Cyprus) CYP	Hector Kyprianou	15	0	13+0	0	0+0	0	1+1	0
6	DF	(England) ENG	Mattie Pollock	16	0	15+0	0	0+0	0	1+0	0
7	FW	(Morocco) MAR	Othmane Maamma	15	0	8+5	0	0+0	0	1+1	0
8	MF	(Italy) ITA	Edoardo Bove	7	0	4+1	0	0+0	0	1+1	0
9	FW	(Denmark) DEN	Luca Kjerrumgaard	12	2	7+4	2	0+0	0	1+0	0
10	FW	(Netherlands) NED	Myron Boadu	7	2	5+2	2	0+0	0	0+0	0
11	FW	(Republic of Ireland) IRL	Rocco Vata	13	0	2+9	0	0+0	0	1+1	0
14	FW	(Germany) GER	Kwadwo Baah	1	0	0+0	0	0+0	0	1+0	0
15	DF	(Senegal) SEN	Krépin Diatta	6	0	4+2	0	0+0	0	0+0	0
16	DF	(England) ENG	Marc Bola	8	1	4+3	0	0+0	0	1+0	1
17	FW	(Spain) ESP	Iker Bravo	16	1	13+2	1	0+0	0	1+0	0
20	FW	(Mali) MLI	Mamadou Doumbia	17	2	7+8	1	0+0	0	1+1	1
21	MF	(Afghanistan) AFG	Amin Nabizada	14	3	8+4	3	0+0	0	0+2	0
22	MF	(Argentina) ARG	Martín Payero	14	0	5+7	0	0+0	0	1+1	0
23	DF	(Germany) GER	Omar Haktab Traoré	12	0	8+3	0	0+0	0	1+0	0
26	GK	(Austria) AUT	Daniel Bachmann	1	0	0+0	0	0+0	0	1+0	0
29	DF	(Croatia) CRO	Branimir Mlačić	8	0	5+3	0	0+0	0	0+0	0
33	DF	(Zimbabwe) ZIM	Jordan Zemura	13	1	8+5	1	0+0	0	0+0	0
39	MF	(Democratic Republic of the Congo) COD	Edo Kayembe	16	1	10+4	1	0+0	0	1+1	0
45	FW	(England) ENG	Stephy Mavididi	7	1	3+4	1	0+0	0	0+0	0
48	FW	(England) ENG	Michael Adu-Poku	2	0	0+1	0	0+0	0	1+0	0
52	MF	(England) ENG	Leo Ramirez-Espain	1	0	0+0	0	0+0	0	1+0	0
53	DF	(England) ENG	James Clarridge	1	0	0+0	0	0+0	0	1+0	0
56	DF	(England) ENG	Albert Eames	4	0	1+2	0	0+0	0	1+0	0
75	DF	(England) ENG	Tomiwa Akinyimika	1	0	0+0	0	0+0	0	1+0	0
80	DF	(England) ENG	Raphael London	1	0	0+0	0	0+0	0	1+0	0

=== Disciplinary record ===
As of match played 7 November 2026

Includes all competitive matches. The list is sorted by squad number when disciplinary points / points per card / number of cards are equal. Players with no cards not included in the list.

Rank	No.	Pos.	Nat.	Name	Championship			FA Cup			EFL Cup			Total		
Rank	No.	Pos.	Nat.	Name	Yellow card	Second yellow card	Red card	Yellow card	Second yellow card	Red card	Yellow card	Second yellow card	Red card	Yellow card	Second yellow card	Red card
1	5	CDM	(Cyprus)	Hector Kyprianou	5	0	0	0	0	0	0	0	0	5	0	0
1	17	CF	(Spain)	Iker Bravo	4	0	0	0	0	0	1	0	0	5	0	0
3	21	LW	(Afghanistan)	Amin Nabizada	4	0	0	0	0	0	0	0	0	4	0	0
3	39	CM	(Democratic Republic of the Congo)	Edo Kayembe	4	0	0	0	0	0	0	0	0	4	0	0
5	4	CB	(Cameroon)	Kévin Keben	3	0	0	0	0	0	0	0	0	3	0	0
5	6	CB	(England)	Mattie Pollock	3	0	0	0	0	0	0	0	0	3	0	0
5	22	CM	(Argentina)	Martín Payero	3	0	0	0	0	0	0	0	0	3	0	0
5	33	LB	(Zimbabwe)	Jordan Zemura	3	0	0	0	0	0	0	0	0	3	0	0
8	7	RW	(Morocco)	Othmane Maamma	2	0	0	0	0	0	0	0	0	2	0	0
8	8	CM	(Italy)	Edoardo Bove	1	0	0	0	0	0	1	0	0	2	0	0
8	20	CF	(Mali)	Mamadou Doumbia	2	0	0	0	0	0	0	0	0	2	0	0
8	23	RB	(Germany)	Omar Haktab Traoré	2	0	0	0	0	0	0	0	0	2	0	0
8	29	CB	(Croatia)	Branimir Mlačić	2	0	0	0	0	0	0	0	0	2	0	0
14	10	CF	(Netherlands)	Myron Boadu	1	0	0	0	0	0	0	0	0	1	0	0
14	45	LW	(Democratic Republic of the Congo)	Stephy Mavididi	1	0	0	0	0	0	0	0	0	1	0	0
Total					40	0	0	0	0	0	2	0	0	42	0	0

== Awards ==
=== Player Awards ===
==== EFL Championship Goal of the Month ====
Month	Player	Opposition	Result	Ref.
August	(Afghanistan) Amin Nabizada	v. West Ham United	Nominated	
