= Myron Boadu =

Dutch footballer (born 2001)

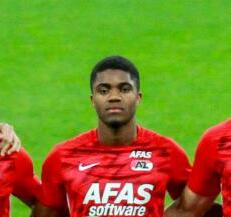
- Boadu lining up for AZ in 2020

Personal information
- Full name: Myron Kwasi Koomson Boadu
- Date of birth: 14 January 2001 (age 25)
- Place of birth: Amsterdam, Netherlands
- Height: 1.83 m (6 ft 0 in)
- Position: Striker

Team information
- Current team: Watford
- Number: 10

Youth career
- SC Buitenveldert
- 2013–2017: AZ

Senior career*
Years	Team	Apps	(Gls)
2016–2019	Jong AZ	10	(6)
2017–2021	AZ	64	(32)
2021–2025	Monaco	52	(8)
2024	→ Twente (loan)	11	(3)
2024–2025	→ VfL Bochum (loan)	19	(9)
2025–2026	PSV	13	(3)
2026–	Watford	7	(2)

International career^{‡}
2015–2016	Netherlands U15	5	(0)
2016	Netherlands U16	2	(0)
2016–2018	Netherlands U17	9	(2)
2018–2019	Netherlands U19	2	(0)
2019–2022	Netherlands U21	17	(12)
2019	Netherlands	1	(1)
- * Club domestic league appearances and goals as of 10:37, 11 November 2026 (UTC) ‡ National team caps and goals as of 11 June 2022

Myron Kwasi Koomson Boadu (born 14 January 2001) is a Dutch professional footballer who plays as a striker for EFL Championship club Watford.

A product of the AZ academy, Boadu became the club's youngest Eredivisie goalscorer and broke into the first team during the 2019–20 season, scoring in the league and in AZ's Europa League campaign. In 2021 he joined Monaco for a reported €17 million, but injuries and competition for places limited his impact, and he had loan spells at Twente and VfL Bochum. He signed for PSV in 2025 and won the 2025–26 Eredivisie title, then moved to Watford in 2026.

Boadu has represented the Netherlands from youth to senior level. On his senior debut in November 2019, he scored against Estonia, becoming the first player born in the 21st century to score for the national team.

== Club career ==
=== AZ ===
Born in Amsterdam to Ghanaian parents, Boadu started playing for SC Buitenveldert, before joining the AZ academy in 2013. He went through the youth ranks before being included in the reserve team prior to the 2016–17 season. On 3 September 2016, he made his debut for the AZ reserves in a match against Excelsior Maassluis, scoring in the 23rd minute. The reserves were crowned champions at the end of the third division season, reaching promotion to the Dutch second division. In 2017, Boadu was included in the first team of AZ, but was sidelined for almost the entire 2017–18 season due to a knee injury. On 6 May 2018, he made his professional debut for AZ in the last match of the Eredivisie season against PEC Zwolle. He came off the bench in the 67th minute, replacing Mats Seuntjens in a 6–0 home victory.

On 12 August 2018, Boadu scored his first professional goal in a match against NAC Breda. In doing so, he became the youngest player to score a goal for AZ in the Eredivisie, aged 17 years and 212 days. The following week he scored again in a match against FC Emmen.

In a home match against Feyenoord on 16 September 2018, Boadu broke his ankle after a collision with Eric Botteghin. He was subsequently ruled out for seven months. He made his comeback for AZ on 20 April 2019, an away match, also against Feyenoord.

During the 2019–20 season, Boadu established himself as a starter for the AZ first team, and scored important goals in the Eredivisie as well as in the club's Europa League campaign. His goals against BK Häcken and Royal Antwerp in the qualifying rounds helped secure AZ's place in the group stage of the tournament.

=== Monaco ===
On 4 August 2021, Monaco announced the signing of Boadu on a five-year deal. It was reported that the deal cost €17,000,000. On 26 September 2021, he provided an assist for Sofiane Diop to seal a 3–1 win at Clermont Foot. Boadu scored his first goal for AS Monaco on 21 October in a 2–1 win against PSV Eindhoven in the Europa League. He scored his third goal in three matches away for Monaco in a row against Saint-Étienne.

==== Loan to Twente ====
On 1 February 2024, Boadu returned to the Netherlands and joined Twente on loan for the remainder of the season. He scored on his debut for the Tukkers on 3 February, coming on for Ricky van Wolfswinkel in the second half of a 3–0 home league win over RKC Waalwijk. Used mainly as a substitute at first, he scored again on 9 March, a decisive goal in a 2–1 home win over Sparta Rotterdam. He finished the loan with three goals in 11 appearances as Twente ended the 2023–24 season third in the table.

==== Loan to Bochum ====
On 9 August 2024, Boadu joined Bundesliga club VfL Bochum on a season-long loan from Monaco. He became a regular in a side battling relegation. On 18 January 2025, after Bochum had trailed 3–0 at home to RB Leipzig, he scored a second-half hat-trick, the third goal from the penalty spot, to salvage a 3–3 draw. His spell was not without friction: manager Dieter Hecking publicly questioned Boadu's fitness and training application, and omitted him from the squad for an April 2025 match against Augsburg. He finished the campaign with nine goals in 19 Bundesliga appearances, having missed 11 matches through injury. Bochum were relegated at the end of the season, and Boadu returned to Monaco.

=== PSV ===
On 30 August 2025, Boadu signed a permanent deal with Eredivisie club PSV, agreeing a contract until June 2026 with the option of a further year. He scored on his competitive debut on 13 September, heading in PSV's fifth goal from a Joey Veerman corner after coming on for Ricardo Pepi in the 65th minute of a 5–3 away win over NEC. Boadu's season was disrupted by injuries, and he made 17 appearances in all competitions, scoring three times, as PSV won the 2025–26 Eredivisie. Boadu officially left PSV as a free agent on 29 July 2026, after the club chose not to extend his contract.

=== Watford ===
On 1 September 2026, Boadu joined EFL Championship club Watford on a free transfer. Short of match fitness after several months without competitive football, Boadu was introduced gradually, making his debut on 18 September, coming on for Mamadou Doumbia in the 70th minute of a 1–0 away defeat to Bristol City.

== International career ==
On 19 November 2019, Boadu made his debut for the Netherlands national team in the UEFA Euro 2020 qualifying match against Estonia, scoring the fifth and final goal in a 5–0 victory. He also became the first player born in the 21st century to feature and score for the Netherlands national team.

== Playing style ==
Boadu has been cited as an example of a "modern poacher", a forward with an explicit focus on scoring goals. He is a product of AZ Alkmaar's academy, a school which puts focus on drilling Dutch total football.

== Career statistics ==
=== Club ===
As of match played 18 September 2026

Appearances and goals by club, season and competition
Club	Season	League			National cup (Note: Includes KNVB Cup, Coupe de France, DFB-Pokal, FA Cup)		Europe		Total	
Club	Season	Division	Apps	Goals	Apps	Goals	Apps	Goals	Apps	Goals
Jong AZ	2016–17	Tweede Divisie	9	6	—		—		9	6
Jong AZ	2018–19	Eerste Divisie	1	0	—		—		1	0
Jong AZ	Total		10	6	—		—		10	6
AZ	2017–18	Eredivisie	1	0	0	0	0 (Note: Appearance(s) in UEFA Europa League)	0	1	0
AZ	2018–19	Eredivisie	8	3	0	0	2	0	10	3
AZ	2019–20	Eredivisie	24	14	2	0	13	6	39	20
AZ	2020–21	Eredivisie	31	15	1	0	6 (Note: Appearance(s) in UEFA Champions League)	0	38	15
AZ	Total		64	32	3	0	21	6	88	38
Monaco	2021–22	Ligue 1	31	4	3	1	8 (Note: One appearance in UEFA Champions League, seven appearances and one goal in UEFA Europa League)	1	42	6
Monaco	2022–23	Ligue 1	12	3	0	0	4 (Note: Four appearances in UEFA Europa League)	0	16	3
Monaco	2023–24	Ligue 1	9	1	1	0	—		10	1
Monaco	Total		52	8	4	1	12	1	68	10
Twente (loan)	2023–24	Eredivisie	11	3	0	0	—		11	3
VfL Bochum (loan)	2024–25	Bundesliga	19	9	1	0	—		20	9
PSV	2025–26	Eredivisie	13	3	1	0	2	0	16	3
Watford	2026–27	EFL Championship	1	0	0	0	—		1	0
Career total			170	61	9	1	35	7	214	69

=== International ===
As of match played 19 November 2019

Appearances and goals by national team and year
National team	Year	Apps	Goals
Netherlands	2019	1	1
Total		1	1

Scores and results the Netherlands' goal tally first.

No.	Date	Venue	Opponent	Score	Result	Competition
1.	19 November 2019	Johan Cruyff Arena, Amsterdam, Netherlands	Estonia	5–0	5–0	UEFA Euro 2020 qualification

== Honours ==
Jong AZ

- Tweede Divisie: 2016–17

PSV

- Eredivisie: 2025–26

Individual

- Eredivisie Talent of the Month: February 2021
- Eredivisie Team of the Month: February 2021
