= Muqadasa Ahmadzai =

Afghani social activist, politician and poet

Muqadasa Ahmadzai (Dari: مقدسه احمدزی; born 1992/1993) is an Afghan social activist, politician and poet who ran in the 2018 Afghan parliamentary election. She is the recipient of a N-Peace Award and was named as one of the BBC's 100 Women in 2021.

== Biography ==
Ahmadzai was 24 years old in 2017. She is a social activist and poet from Nangarhar, Afghanistan. Initially her family were opposed to her activism and she endured physical punishment when they discovered her activities. Whilst a teenager, she published a book of poetry, and it was her uncle's appreciation of this that changed her family's opinion of her work.

A former member and Deputy Speaker of the Afghan Youth Parliament, during the COVID-19 pandemic she worked to support women and communities against disinformation. She was a founder of the National Youth Council in Afghanistan. She represented the voices of Afghan women as part of the Afghanistan and Pakistan Peace Dialogues. Alongside other women she began a campaign of mural painting with women's rights messages in Jalalabad. She also established a network of 400 women who travelled the country, including into areas at the time that were controlled by the Taliban, to women who were survivors of domestic violence. She is the founder and Director of the Kor Association, which aims to raise awareness of women's rights in Afghanistan.

In 2018 she ran for election to the Afghan parliament.

== Awards ==
Ahmadzai was awarded a N-Peace Award, by the United Nations Development Programme. She was named as one of the BBC's 100 Women in 2021.
