= Mariam Solaimankhil =

Afghan-American politician (born 1984)

Member of the House of the People
- In office 2019–2021
- Constituency: Kuchi

Personal details
- Born: 1984 (age 41–42) California
- Education: California State University, Los Angeles

Mariam Solaimankhil (Pashto: مریم سلیمانخیل) is an Afghan-American politician and critic of the Taliban.

== Life ==
Solaimankhil, the daughter of Hamidullah, was born in California in 1984. She graduated from California State University, Los Angeles in 2017 with BS degree in Media Studies and worked as a beautician in the US before moving to Afghanistan. Upon returning to Afghanistan, she was appointed as the Head of International Relations at the Presidential Palace and advisor to the Ministry of Deputy. In the 2018 election, she was elected as a member of House of the People representing Kuchi with 839 votes. In 2019, she was chosen as the secretary of the defense committee.

== Views ==
=== Taliban ===
Solaimankhil is a Taliban opponent and called the group a "proxy of Pakistan" and "doesn't represent any particular ethnicity or locality in Afghanistan."

== Personal life ==
She speaks Pashto and English.
