= Kévin Keben =

Cameroonian footballer (born 2004)

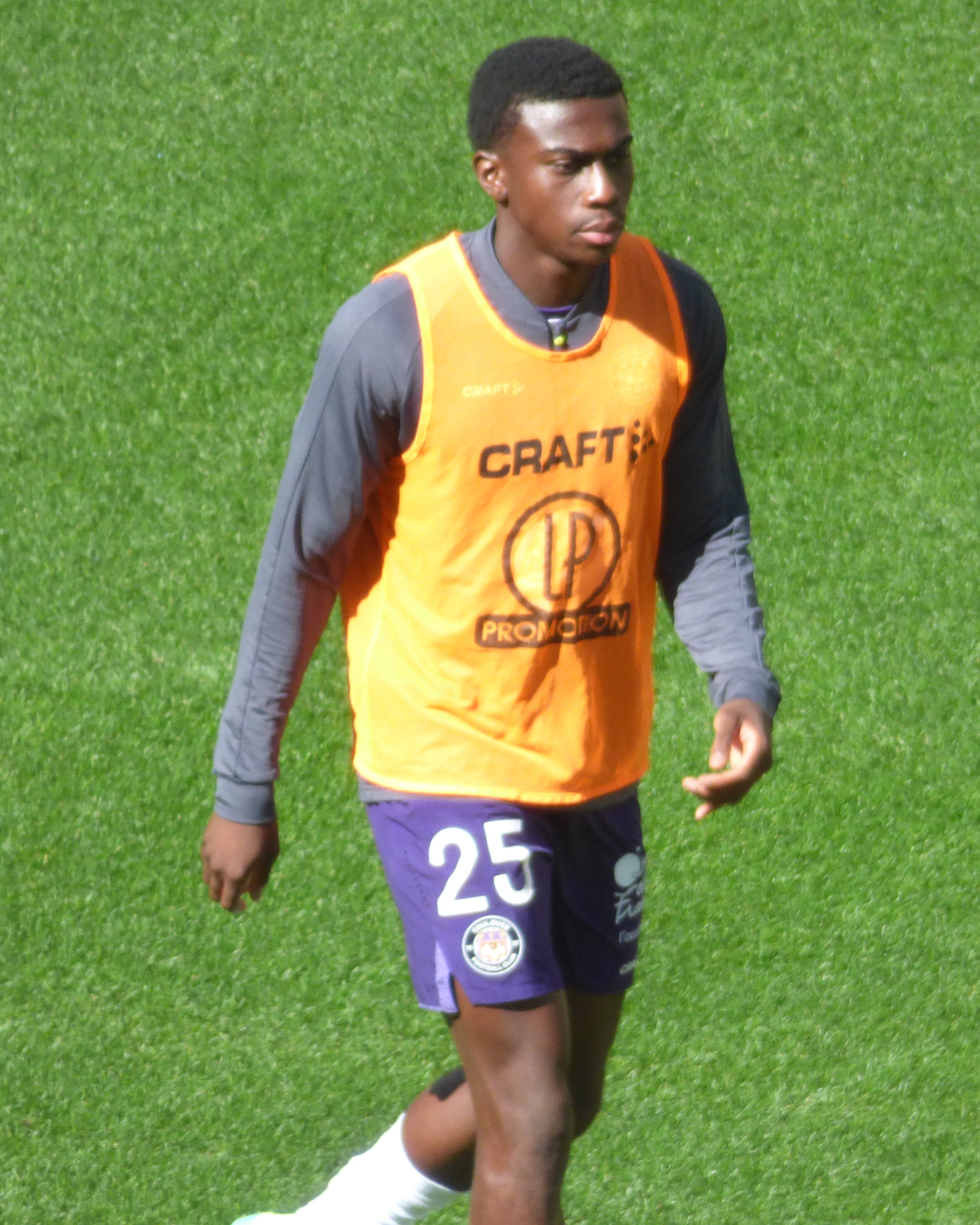
- Keben warming up for Toulouse in 2023

Personal information
- Full name: Kévin Xavier Keben Biakolo
- Date of birth: 26 January 2004 (age 22)
- Place of birth: Bertoua, Cameroon
- Height: 1.87 m (6 ft 2 in)
- Position: Centre-back

Team information
- Current team: Watford
- Number: 4

Youth career
- 2009–2013: Toulouse Montaudran
- 2013–2021: Toulouse

Senior career*
| Years | Team | Apps | (Gls) |
| 2021–2023 | Toulouse II | 19 | (1) |
| 2022–2024 | Toulouse | 19 | (0) |
| 2024– | Watford | 44 | (0) |

International career^{‡}
| 2023– | Cameroon U23 | 2 | (0) |
| 2026– | Cameroon | 2 | (0) |
- * Club domestic league appearances and goals as of 14 October 2026 (UTC) ‡ National team caps and goals as of 22:03, 24 September 2026 (UTC)

Kévin Xavier Keben Biakolo (born 26 January 2004) is a Cameroonian professional footballer who plays as a centre-back for EFL Championship club Watford and the Cameroon national team.

== Club career ==
=== Toulouse ===
Born in Bertoua, Cameroon, Keben moved to France at the age of 2 and at 5 started playing football at Toulouse Montaudran. At the age of 10, he joined the youth academy of Toulouse and started working his way up their youth sides. He was promoted to their reserves in 2021, and represented the senior side in a Coupe de France match over Aubagne. On 1 February 2022, he signed his first professional contract with Toulouse. On 7 August 2022, he made his professional debut with Toulouse in a 1–1 Ligue 1 tie with OGC Nice, coming on as a substitute in the 79th minute.

=== Watford ===
On 29 August 2024, Keben signed for EFL Championship club Watford on a four-year deal for an undisclosed fee.

== International career ==
Keben played for the Cameroon U23s for a set of 2023 U-23 Africa Cup of Nations qualification matches in March 2023.

== Career statistics ==
=== Club ===
As of match played 19 September 2026

Appearances and goals by club, season and competition
| Club | Season | League | | | National cup (Note: Includes Coupe de France) | | League cup | | Other | | Total | |
| Club | Season | Division | Apps | Goals | Apps | Goals | Apps | Goals | Apps | Goals | Apps | Goals |
|---|---|---|---|---|---|---|---|---|---|---|---|---|
| Toulouse II | 2021–22 | Championnat National 3 | 11 | 0 | — | | — | | — | | 11 | 0 |
| Toulouse II | 2022–23 | Championnat National 3 | 8 | 1 | — | | — | | — | | 8 | 1 |
| Toulouse II | Total | | 19 | 1 | — | | — | | — | | 19 | 1 |
| Toulouse | 2020–21 | Ligue 2 | 0 | 0 | 1 | 0 | — | | — | | 1 | 0 |
| Toulouse | 2021–22 | Ligue 2 | 0 | 0 | 0 | 0 | — | | — | | 0 | 0 |
| Toulouse | 2022–23 | Ligue 1 | 11 | 0 | 0 | 0 | — | | — | | 11 | 0 |
| Toulouse | 2023–24 | Ligue 1 | 8 | 0 | 1 | 0 | — | | 2 (Note: Appearances in UEFA Europa League) | 0 | 11 | 0 |
| Toulouse | Total | | 19 | 0 | 2 | 0 | — | | 2 | 0 | 23 | 0 |
| Watford | 2024–25 | EFL Championship | 6 | 0 | 0 | 0 | 0 | 0 | — | | 6 | 0 |
| Watford | 2025–26 | EFL Championship | 29 | 0 | 1 | 0 | 1 | 0 | — | | 31 | 0 |
| Watford | 2026–27 | EFL Championship | 8 | 0 | 0 | 0 | 2 | 0 | — | | 10 | 0 |
| Watford | Total | | 43 | 0 | 1 | 0 | 3 | 0 | — | | 47 | 0 |
| Career total | | | 81 | 1 | 3 | 0 | 3 | 0 | 2 | 0 | 89 | 1 |

=== International ===
As of match played 24 September 2026

Appearances and goals by national team and year
| National team | Year | Apps | Goals |
|---|---|---|---|
| Cameroon | 2026 | 2 | 0 |
| Total | | 2 | 0 |
