= Leo Ramirez-Espain =

English footballer (born 2006)

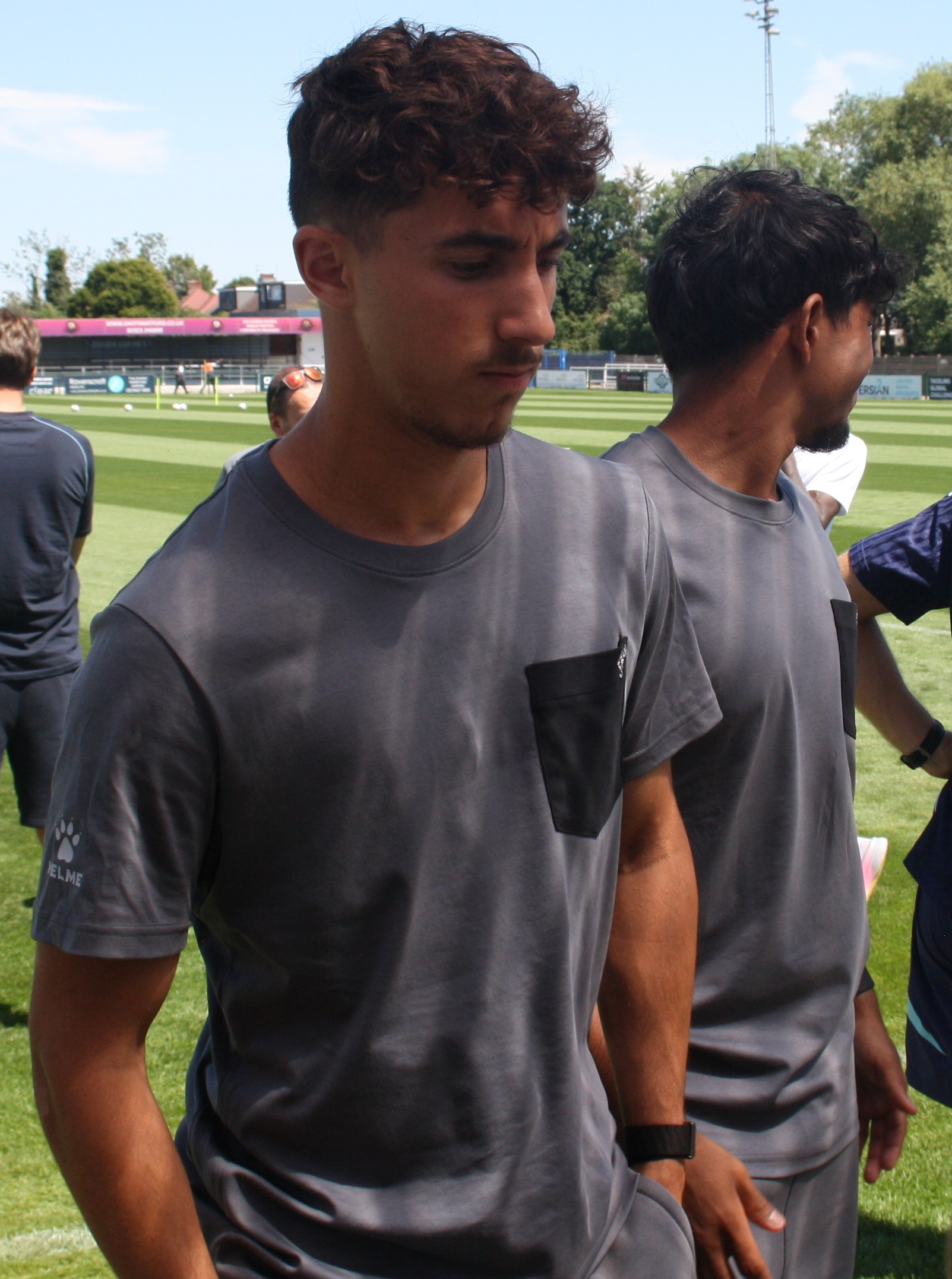
- Ramirez-Espain with Watford in 2025

Personal information
- Full name: Leo Ramirez-Espain
- Date of birth: 2 October 2006 (age 20)
- Place of birth: England
- Height: 1.82 m (6 ft 0 in)
- Position: Defensive midfielder

Team information
- Current team: Hemel Hempstead Town (on loan from Watford)

Youth career
- –2016: Brentford
- 2016–: Watford

Senior career*
Years	Team	Apps	(Gls)
2024–	Watford	0	(0)
2025	→ Yeovil Town (loan)	0	(0)
2026–	→ Hemel Hempstead Town (loan)	3	(0)
- * Club domestic league appearances and goals as of 00:39, 14 September 2026 (UTC)

Leo Ramirez-Espain (born 2 October 2006) is an English professional footballer who plays as a defensive midfielder for National League South side Hemel Hempstead Town, on loan from EFL Championship club Watford.

== Career ==
Ramirez-Espain joined Watford in 2016, at the age of 9. Ramirez-Espain made his professional debut, aged 17, on 13, August, 2024, in a 5–0 Carabao Cup draw with Milton Keynes Dons, coming on as a substitute to replace Tom Dele-Bashiru after 76 minutes. came back in for the next match against Plymouth Argyle to replace Tom Dele-Bashiru again after 75 minutes.

In November 2025, Ramirez-Espain joined National League side Yeovil Town on loan until the end of January 2026. On 16 December 2025, after making just one appearance for Yeovil, Ramirez-Espain was recalled from his loan by Watford. In September 2026, he joined National League South side Hemel Hempstead Town on loan.

== Personal life ==
Ramirez-Espain was born in England to an Argentinian father and a South African mother, and is of Spanish descent on his father's side.

== Career statistics ==
As of match played 12 September 2026

Appearances and goals by club, season and competition
Club	Season	League			FA Cup		EFL Cup		Other		Total	
Club	Season	Division	Apps	Goals	Apps	Goals	Apps	Goals	Apps	Goals	Apps	Goals
Watford	2024–25	Championship	0	0	0	0	2	0	—		2	0
Watford	2025–26	Championship	0	0	0	0	0	0	—		0	0
Watford	2026–27	Championship	0	0	0	0	1	0	—		1	0
Watford	Total		0	0	0	0	3	0	—		3	0
Yeovil Town (loan)	2025–26	National League	0	0	0	0	—		1 (Note: Appearance in FA Trophy)	0	1	0
Hemel Hempstead Town (loan)	2026–27	National League South	3	0	0	0	—		0	0	3	0
Career total			3	0	0	0	3	0	1	0	7	0
