= Farzana Kochai =

Afghan women's rights activist

- فرزانه کوچۍ

Member of the House of the People
- In office 2019–2021

Personal details
- Born: 1991 or 1992 (age 33–34) Baghlan Province, Afghanistan

Farzana Elham Kochai (Pashto: فرزانه الهام کوچۍ) is an Afghan women's rights activist and former politician living in exile in Vestnes, Norway. She served as a member of the lower house of the National Assembly, the House of the People (Wolesi Jirga), from her inauguration in 2019 until the Taliban's takeover of the country in 2021.

== Biography ==
Kochai was born in Baghlan Province, Afghanistan, to a family of Kochis (Kochai), a subgroup of the majority Pashtuns. During the Taliban's first period of rule, boys were sent to madrasas while girls were kept at home to tend to the household with their mothers. Kochai and her sisters began their education in private classes taught by a female teacher hired by a local Taliban leader who wanted his own daughters to receive schooling. Her parents were shunned by their community after they refused their relatives' demands to pull their daughters out of the classes. Kochai continued her studies at reopened schools following the ouster of the Taliban, and completed twelve years of schooling in seven.

She later moved to the capital Kabul and became an advocate of women's rights in Afghanistan. She was elected to the lower house of the Afghan parliament, the House of the People (Wolesi Jirga), in 2018; however, the parliament was not inaugurated until the following year. She was the youngest member of the House of the People at the time, at age 29. Her tenure was cut short by the Taliban's second takeover of Afghanistan in 2021. She was the first woman to be interviewed on national television following the Taliban's resumption of power; her criticisms of the Taliban to the international press led to a threatening visit from Taliban officials. She subsequently fled to Norway and now lives in exile in the village of Vestnes, with a brother, a sister, and her three children. The rest of her family lives in Canada, while her mother remains in Afghanistan.
