= National Assembly (Afghanistan) =

Former bicameral national legislature of Afghanistan

National Assembly of the Republic of Afghanistan د افغانستان جمهوريت ملي شورا شورای ملی جمهوری افغانستان

Type
- Type: bicameral
- Houses: Meshrano Jirga (House of Elders) Wolesi Jirga (House of the People)

History
- Founded: 1931
- Disbanded: 15 August 2021
- Succeeded by: Leadership Council
- Seats: 352: Meshrano Jirga: 102; Wolesi Jirga: 250

Elections
- House of Elders voting system: One-third (34) elected by district councils; One-third (34) by provincial councils; One third (34) nominated by the president
- House of the People voting system: Single non-transferable vote
- First House of the People election: 31 October 1931
- Last House of the People election: 20 and 27 October 2018

Meeting place
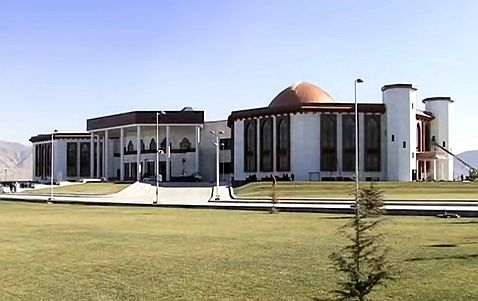
- Kabul

Website
- parliament.af (dead) (15 August 2021 archive)

The National Assembly (Pashto: ملی شورا, romanized: Milli Shura, Dari: شورای ملی, romanized: Shura-e Milli), also known as the Parliament of Afghanistan or simply as the Afghan Parliament, was the legislature of Afghanistan in various forms from the monarchy, republican, communist and liberal democratic periods between 1931 and 2021. It was a bicameral body, comprising two chambers:

- Meshrano Jirga (مشرانو جرګه) or the House of Elders: an upper house with 102 seats.
- Wolesi Jirga (ولسي جرګه) or the House of the People: a lower house with 250 seats

According to Chapter Five of the 2004 Constitution of Afghanistan, "the National Assembly of the Islamic Republic of Afghanistan as the highest legislative organ is the manifestation of the will of its people and represents the whole nation. Every member of the National Assembly takes into judgment the general welfare and supreme interests of all people of Afghanistan at the time of casting their vote".

The parliament was effectively suspended between 1992 and 2005 due to the ongoing war and was reconstituted in 2005 after the collapse of the first Taliban regime. It was dissolved when the Taliban regained control of the country on 15 August 2021, and transferred legislative authority to the Leadership Council. The Taliban did not include the National Assembly and several other agencies of the former government in its first national budget in May 2022. Government spokesman Innamullah Samangani said that due to the financial crisis, only active agencies were included in the budget, and the excluded ones had been dissolved, but noted they could be brought back "if needed".

== Duties of the National Assembly ==
Ratification, modification or abrogation of laws or legislative decrees; Approval of social, cultural, economic as well as technological development programs; Approval of the state budget as well as permission to obtain or grant loans; Creation, modification and or abrogation of administrative units; Ratification of international treaties and agreements, or abrogation of membership of Afghanistan in them; Other authorities enshrined in this Constitution.

== The Wolesi Jirga (House of the People) ==
The Wolesi Jirga had 250 seats with members directly elected by the people. Sixty-eight women were elected to the seats reserved under the Constitution, while 17 of them were elected in their own right. Each province was given proportionate representation in the Wolesi Jirga according to its population. Each member of the Wolesi Jirga enjoyed a five-year term.

An aspiring candidate for the Wolesi Jirga had to fulfill the following criteria:

- Be at least 25 years of age
- Be a citizen of Afghanistan
- Be registered as a voter
- Be running as a representative in only one province
- Pay a registration fee of 15,000 Afghanis (approximately US$300) which will be refunded provided the candidate wins at least three percent (3%) of the vote
- Submit a nomination form along with photocopies of 500 voter ID cards supporting the candidacy

In addition, no candidate could have been charged with crimes against humanity.

== The Meshrano Jirga (House of Elders) ==
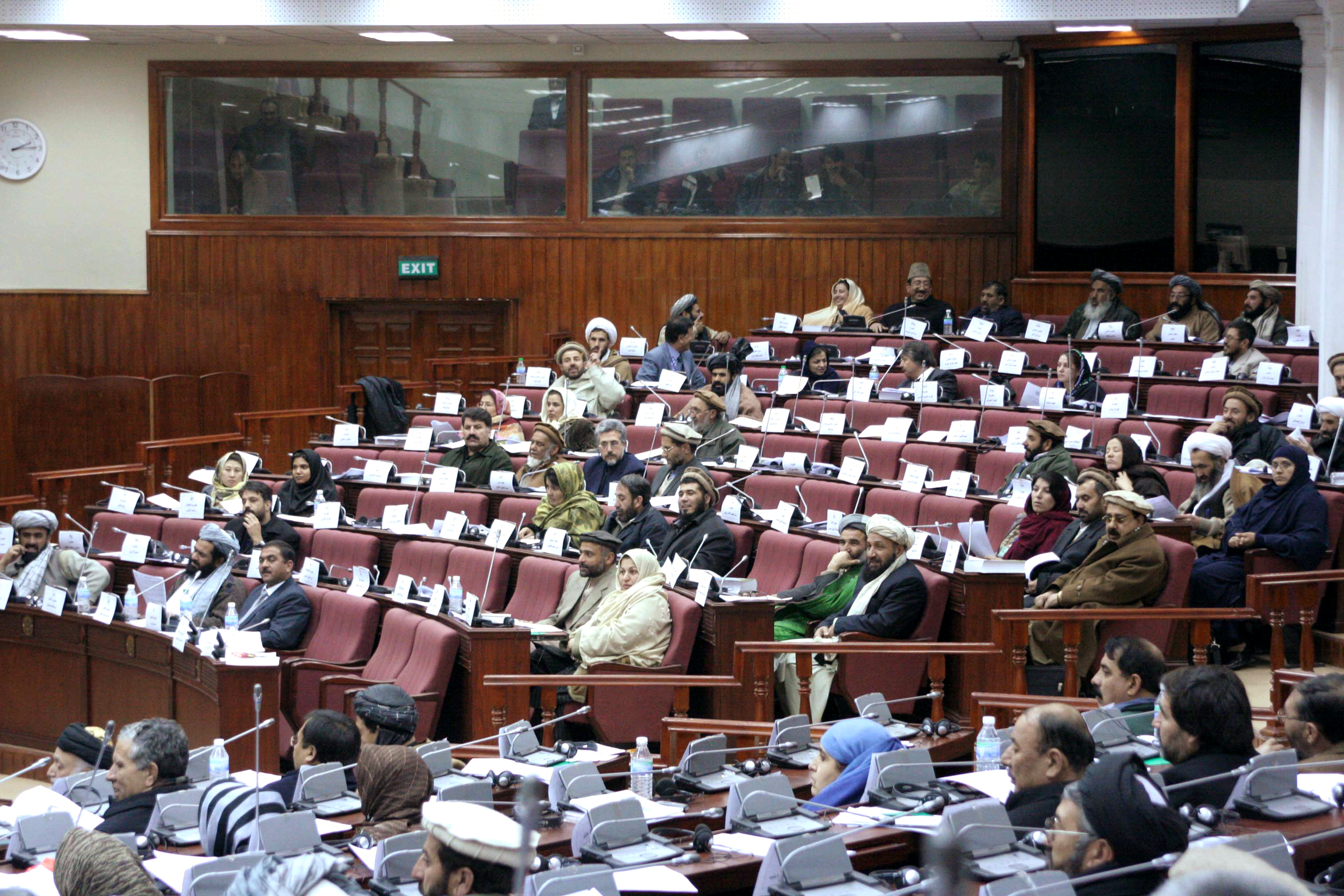
The inside of the old Parliament building (2006).

The Meshrano Jirga consisted of a mixture of appointed and elected members (total 102 members). Sixty-eight members were selected by 34 directly elected Provincial Councils, and 34 were appointed by the President. President Karzai's appointments were vetted by an independent UN sponsored election board and included 17 women (50%), as required by the Constitution.

Each provincial council elected one council member to serve in the Jirga (34 members), also each district council (34 members). Representatives of provincial councils served a term of four years, while representatives of district councils served a term of three years. Sebghatulla Mojadeddi was appointed President of Meshrano Jirga.

An aspiring candidate for the Meshrano Jirga had to fulfill the following criteria:

- Be at least 35 years of age
- Be a citizen of Afghanistan

In addition, no potential member of the Meshrano Jirga could have been charged with crimes against humanity.

== New Parliament building ==
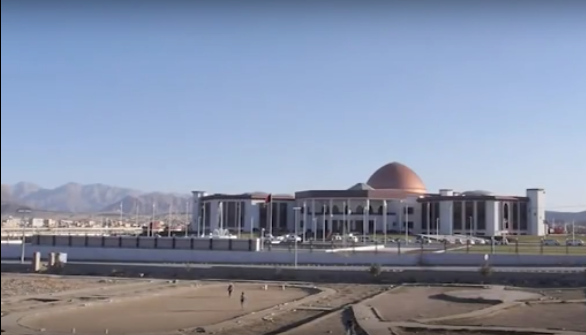
The new National Assembly Building

The National Assembly is located next to the famous Darul Aman Palace in Darulaman, which is the southwestern section of Kabul where many important national institutions are found. The current building for the Assembly was built by India as part of its contribution in the rebuilding of Afghanistan. It was inaugurated in late 2015 by Afghan President Ashraf Ghani and his guest Narendra Modi, the Prime Minister of India. The current Parliament was inaugurated on April 26, 2019, after being sworn in by Ghani.

The foundation stone for the new National Assembly Building was laid in August 2005 by the last reigning monarch of Afghanistan, King Zahir, in the presence of Hamid Karzai and Manmohan Singh. India's Central Public Works Department (CPWD) was the consultant for the project and the contract was awarded to an Indian infrastructure company in 2008. The new Parliament building is corralled in a 40-hectare plot in the famous Darulaman section of Kabul. It sits next to two historical landmarks: the Darul Aman Palace and the Tajbeg Palace.

The construction work on the $220 million building was initially slated to be complete by 2012, in 36 months. The deadline, however, was pushed back due to challenging work conditions, shortage of skilled workforce and precarious security environment. More than 500 laborers had worked on the building, most of them Indian nationals. The main attraction of the building is a bronze dome of 32 meter diameter and 17.15 meter height is considered to be the largest dome in Asia. The big dome will cover the assembly hall and the small dome will be over the entrance lobby. In front of the building, there is a water body with nine cascading fountains. Inside the building, a 6-meter fountain, made of green marble imported from Indian city of Udaipur, has been installed.

On December 25, 2015, during a state visit of Indian Prime Minister Narendra Modi, the new Parliament building was inaugurated along with President Ashraf Ghani. Ghani tweeted: "Pleased to welcome PM Modi to Kabul. Though, India & Afghanistan need no introduction, we are bound by a thousand ties... We have stood by each other in the best and worst of times."

== See also ==
- Afghan Youth Parliament
- Politics of Afghanistan
- 2018 Afghan parliamentary election
- List of legislatures by country
- Afghanistan–India relations
- Women in the Parliament of Afghanistan
