= Hemel Hempstead Town F.C. =

Association football club in Hemel Hempstead, England

Coordinates: 51°45′13.96″N 0°26′39.92″W

Hemel Hempstead Town
- Full name: Hemel Hempstead Town Football Club
- Nickname: The Tudors
- Founded: 1885
- Ground: Vauxhall Road, Hemel Hempstead
- Capacity: 3,152 (300 seated)
- Chairman: David Boggins
- Manager: Lee Bircham
- League: National League South
- 2025–26: National League South, 5th of 24
- Website: hemelfc.com
Home colours	Away colours

Hemel Hempstead Town Football Club is a semi-professional football club based in Hemel Hempstead, Hertfordshire, England. Affiliated to the Hertfordshire County Football Association, they are currently members of the National League South and play at Vauxhall Road.

== History ==
The club was established in 1885 as Apsley End. They joined the West Herts League in 1891 and were renamed Apsley Football Club two years later. The club were league champions in 1894–95 and 1897–98, and in 1898 they were founder members of the Hertfordshire Senior County League. They went on to win the league in its second season, 1899–1900. The league was split into two divisions in 1901, with Apsley placed in the Western Division. They were divisional champions in 1902–03 and won the championship play-off against Northern Division champions St Albans Amateurs. The club had continued playing in the West Herts League and won the title for a third time in 1904–05. After winning the Western Division of the Hertfordshire Senior County League again in 1906–07, they defeated Northern Division Champions Hitchin Union Jack 5–3 in the championship play-off.

In 1922 Apsley left the Hertfordshire Senior County League to join Division Two of the Spartan League. They were Division Two runners-up in 1923–24, after which league reorganisation saw them placed in Division Two A. They were Division Two A runners-up in 1926–27, but were demoted to Division Two West following further league reorganisation in 1928. More reorganisation in 1930 saw the club moved into Division One for the 1930–31 season. The club were Division One runners-up in 1931–32, earning promotion to the Premier Division. Although they were relegated back to Division One at the end of their first season in the Premier Division, the club were Division One champions and League Cup winners in 1933–34, earning an immediate return to the Premier Division.

Apsley were relegated to Division One again at the end of the 1935–36 season. In 1938–39 they reached the first round of the FA Cup for the first time, losing 2–1 at Bromley. Following World War II the club were placed in the Western Division for the 1945–46 season and finished bottom of the table. They were subsequently placed in Division One West and the club's name was changed to Hemel Hempstead. They were Division One West runners-up in 1947–48 and again in 1950–51, after which they were promoted back to the Premier Division. However, after a single season in the Premier Division the club left to join the Delphian League.

In 1955 the club was renamed Hemel Hempstead Town. They were Delphian League runners-up in 1961–62, and when the league was dissolved in 1963, they following most other Delphian League clubs into the new Division Two of the Athenian League. They were promoted to Division One at the end of the 1964–65 seasons, and were Division One runners-up the following season, earning promotion to the Premier Division. However, after finishing bottom of the Premier Division in 1967–68, the club were relegated back to Division One. A second successive relegation followed in 1968–69 when they finished second-from-bottom of Division One.

In 1971 the club merged with Hemel Hempstead United from the South Midlands League to form Hemel Hempstead Football Club. The new club took Hemel Hempstead Town's place in Division Two of the Athenian League, but moved to Hemel Hempstead United's Vauxhall Road ground. The club remained in the Athenian League until joining Division Two of the Isthmian League in 1977. League reorganisation in 1984 saw them placed in Division Two North, where they remained until further reorganisation in 1991 led to them playing in Division Two. They finished bottom of Division Two in 1996–97 and were relegated to Division Three, but won the Division Three title the following season to earn promotion back to Division Two at the first attempt.

In 1999 the club was renamed Hemel Hempstead Town for a second time. They won Division Two in 1999–2000 but were denied promotion due to their ground failing to meet the necessary criteria. They were moved to Division One North in 2002, and a sixth-place finish in 2003–04 was enough to secure promotion as the creation of the Conference North and South led to many clubs moving up the leagues. At the same time the club were transferred to the Southern League and placed in its Premier Division. The following season saw the club finish in the relegation zone, resulting in relegation to Division One West. However, a fourth-place finish in 2005–06 meant the club qualified for the promotion play-offs; after beating Swindon Supermarine 3–0 in the semi-finals, they won the final against Brackley Town 3–2 to earn an immediate return to the Premier Division.

In 2006–07 Hemel Hempstead finished fifth in the Southern League Premier Division, qualifying for the play-offs, in which they lost 3–1 to Team Bath. Another fifth-place finish in 2008–09 led to another play-off campaign that saw them lose 4–3 on penalties to Farnborough in the semi-finals. The club finished fourth in 2012–13; in the play-offs they won 2–0 against Chesham United in the semi-finals, before losing 5–4 on penalties to Gosport Borough in the final. The following season saw the club win the Southern League Premier Division title, earning promotion to the Conference South. In 2014–15 they reached the first round of the FA Cup, eventually losing 3–1 at Bury. A fifth-place finish in 2017–18 saw the club qualify for the play-offs. However, they were beaten 3–2 in a penalty shoot-out by Braintree Town in the qualifying round.

The 2025–26 season saw Hemel Hempstead finish fifth in the National League South, before losing on penalties to Weston-super-Mare in the play-off quarter-finals.

== Crest and nickname ==
The crest features King Henry VIII, who features in the town's history. The town was part of the monastery's estates until the King initiated the Reformation and break-up of Ashridge in 1539, as part of the dissolution of the monasteries. In that same year, the town was granted a royal charter by Henry VIII to become a bailiwick with the right to hold a Thursday market and a fair on Corpus Christi Day. Henry VIII and Anne Boleyn are also reputed to have stayed in the town at the time. The association with Henry VIII is why the club is nicknamed the Tudors.

== Ground ==
Apsley End initially played at Salmon Meadow in Apsley, which was named after 'The Salmon', a nearby pub that was also used as the changing rooms. After World War I the club moved to the Apsley Club & Institute, which featured a small stand. However, they were forced to leave at the end of the 1927–28 season due to an expansion of the adjacent mill. The club then played at Gee's Meadow in Bourne End for the 1928–29 season, with the stand from Salmon Meadow dismantled and brought to the new ground. In 1929 the club moved to Crabtree Lane. Located in the town centre, the ground had a large grandstand. The club's record attendance was set in January 1962 when 3,500 saw the team lose 3–1 to Tooting & Mitcham United in the FA Amateur Cup.

Following the merger in 1972, Crabtree Lane was sold for housing and the new club played at Hemel Hempstead United's Vauxhall Road, which had been opened in May 1948 as the Greenhills Club. The clubhouse and changing rooms burnt down in 1992 and the club had to use temporary facilities for five years. The ground has seated stands on both sides of the pitch, and in the early 2000s covered terrace stands were built behind both goals. The ground currently has a capacity of 3,152, of which 300 is seated and 900 covered.

== Current squad ==
As of 28 October 2026.

Note: Flags indicate national team as defined under FIFA eligibility rules; some limited exceptions apply. Players may hold more than one non-FIFA nationality.

Pos.	Nation	Player
GK	ENG	Michael Johnson
GK	ENG	James Taylor (dual-registered with Leighton Town)
DF	ENG	David Agbontohoma
DF	ENG	Christian Chigozie (on loan from Luton Town)
DF	ENG	Darion Dowrich
DF	ENG	David Longe-King
DF	ENG	Stefan Parkes
DF	SCO	Isaac Pitblado
DF	ENG	Charlie Rowan (captain)
DF	SLE	David Sesay
DF	ENG	Devonte Stanley
DF	ENG	Harry Webster (on loan from Gillingham)

No.	Pos.	Nation	Player
MF	WAL	Jacob Cook (on loan from Swansea City)	
MF	ENG	Marshall Francis	
MF	ENG	Josh Green	
MF	NIR	Rio Oudnie-Morgan	
MF	ENG	Leo Ramirez-Espain (on loan from Watford)	
MF	WAL	Alfie Tuck	
MF	WAL	George Williams	
MF	ENG	Kyran Wiltshire	
FW	ENG	Lee Angol	
FW	SKN	Harry Panayiotou	
FW	ENG	Josh Steele	
FW	ENG	Jake Tabor	

=== Out on loan ===
Note: Flags indicate national team as defined under FIFA eligibility rules; some limited exceptions apply. Players may hold more than one non-FIFA nationality.

Pos.	Nation	Player
DF	ENG	Jake Watkiss (at Needham Market until 20 November 2026)
MF	ENG	Alex Enright (at Hendon)
MF	ENG	Cameron Forde-Brown (at Maldon & Tiptree until 30 October 2026)

No.	Pos.	Nation	Player
FW	ENG	Jesse Effa (at Chertsey Town until 31 October 2026)	
FW	ENG	Amir Hadi (at Basingstoke Town until 20 November 2026)	

== Non-playing staff ==
As of 24 July 2026

Position	Staff
Manager	Lee Bircham
Assistant Manager	David Noble
Head Coach	John Fletcher
Fitness Coach	Caitlin Taylor
Head of Recruitment	Joseph Pope

== Honours ==
- Southern League
  - Premier Division champions 2013–14
- Isthmian League
  - Division Two champions 1999–2000
  - Division Three champions 1997–98
- Spartan League
  - Division One champions 1933–34
  - League Cup winners 1933–34
- Hertfordshire Senior County League
  - Champions 1899–1900
  - Western Division champions 1902–03, 1906–07
- West Herts League
  - Champions 1894–95, 1897–98, 1904–05
- Herts Senior Cup
  - Winners 1905–06, 1907–08, 1908–09, 1925–26, 2012–13, 2014–15, 2024–25
- Herts Charity Shield
  - Winners 1925–26, 1934–35, 1951–52, 1963–64, 1976–77, 1983–84
- Herts Charity Cup
  - Winners 2004–05, 2008–09, 2009–10

== Records ==
- Best FA Cup performance: First round, 1938–39, 2014–15, 2025–26
- Best FA Trophy performance: Third round, 2014–15, 2018–19, 2025–26
- Best FA Vase performance: Fifth round, 1981–82
- Record attendance: 3,500 vs Tooting & Mitcham United, FA Amateur Cup first round, January 1962
- Most appearances: John Wallace, 1,012
- Most goals: Jordan Parkes, 110

== See also ==
- Hemel Hempstead Town F.C. players
- Hemel Hempstead Town F.C. managers
