= Afghan Youth Parliament =

Decentralized digital youth governance platform for Afghanistan

Afghanistan Youth Parliament for Freedom, Rebuilding and Sustainability
- Abbreviation: AYPFRS
- Predecessor: Afghanistan's Youth Parliament (2016–2021 model)
- Formation: Late 2023 (Re-established as an independent digital governance platform)
- Type: NGO / Digital Governance Ecosystem
- Legal status: Active
- Headquarters: Decentralized / Online (Digital Platform)
- Region served: Afghanistan and the Afghan global diaspora
- Official language: Pashto and Parsi-e-Dari
- Website: aypfrs.net
- Remarks: Operates as a strictly independent, politically neutral civil society framework.

The Afghanistan Youth Parliament for Freedom, Rebuilding and Sustainability (AYPFRS) is a decentralized, youth-led digital governance platform and civil society ecosystem. Established in late 2023, the organization serves as an alternative institutional framework to unite, educate, and empower Afghan youth both inside Afghanistan and across its global diaspora.

The organization operates with strict political neutrality. It is entirely independent, functioning neither as a branch or supporter of the current de facto domestic authorities, nor as an oppositional political entity against them or any other faction. This neutral stance is maintained to ensure the physical safety and operational security of its grassroots representatives working directly within local Afghan communities. Operating under the guiding philosophy of mindset freedom, independent entrepreneurship, and alternative education, the platform acts as an action-oriented civic hub rather than a political debate club, focusing strictly on internal generation-building and socio-economic resilience.

== History and Evolution ==
=== Original State-Backed Era (2016–2021) ===
The original iteration, known as "Afghanistan's Youth Parliament" (AYP), was established on 14 August 2016 through the Deputy Ministry of Youth Affairs, with financial backing from the United Nations Population Fund (UNFPA) and coordination from the upper house of the parliament (Mashrano Jirga).

This early model consisted of 122 democratically elected members representing the 34 provinces of Afghanistan, focusing heavily on political inclusivity (including quotas for women, nomads, disabled individuals, and minority Hindu and Sikh populations). This state-backed infrastructure ceased operations following the geopolitical changes in Afghanistan in August 2021.

=== Re-establishment as an Independent Platform (2023–present) ===
In late 2023, the movement was completely re-founded and restructured from the ground up as a fully independent, non-governmental entity under its current title: the Afghanistan Youth Parliament for Freedom, Rebuilding and Sustainability (AYPFRS). Shifting entirely away from reliance on foreign intervention, political alignments, or direct state funding, the organization transitioned into a sophisticated digital governance model designed to preserve peaceful civic spaces, provide professional development, and support marginalized demographics and rural populations through technical cooperation.

== Core Ideology and Manifesto ==
According to its foundational manifesto, AYPFRS defines itself as an "enlightenment revolution and human-building movement in the minds" (انقلاب روشنگری و انسان‌سازی در ذهن‌ها). Its framework relies on four core principles:

- Self and Environmental Awareness: Encouraging localized understanding to prevent ineffective, imported solutions.
- Learning and Teaching (Continuous Education): Operating a reciprocal knowledge system where skills acquired by members are systematically passed down to others.
- Purposeful Grassroots Action: Directing policy debates immediately toward physical community projects.
- Economic Self-Reliance: Viewing financial independence and local entrepreneurship as the primary shield protecting individual sovereignty and freedom.

== Organizational Architecture ==
The platform's framework is managed through specialized pillars, chambers, and networks:

=== Parliamentary Committees ===
The representative core maps youth participation across all 34 provinces and 364 districts of Afghanistan. Local youth members form specialized committees to research, debate, and draft strategic development frameworks (including long-term Vision 2030 and Vision 2050 roadmaps).

=== Chambers of Expertise ===
To convert technical policy into ground-level impact, the platform hosts independent professional chambers. Scholars, technical experts, and professionals register within dedicated chambers to design and execute engineering, technical, and social action plans directly within Afghan communities.

=== Leadership & Learning Pillar ===
Acts as an alternative human capital incubator to bridge domestic educational divides. It contains:

- The Women’s Academy (اکادمی زن): A safe, dedicated digital institutional space providing women and girls with advanced technical, business literacy, and leadership training.
- The University Network & Ambassadorship Program: Connects students across different campuses to maintain educational continuity.

=== Diplomacy & Partnership Pillar ===
Serves as the external diplomatic gateway, utilizing a system of International Ambassadors and decentralized "City Diplomats" to advocate for Afghan youth interests at global summits and build solidarity paths with international entities.

=== Community Safety & Liaison ===
Maintains a secure reporting and communication infrastructure bridging domestic residents with the global diaspora. It leverages a "Village Liaison Network" to capture concerns from remote rural areas (which constitute 85% of their targeted layout) and runs a specialized Diaspora Protection Desk to track the safety of refugees and migrant student blocks.

=== Think-Tank & Media Center ===
- The Think-Tank Center: An academic research incubator hosting a public submission portal for policy-driven data on regional integration and economic resilience.
- The Grassroots Media Network: A decentralized communication arm that permits youth to securely document localized ground realities, structural challenges, and civic progress.

== Notable members ==
- Muqadasa Ahmadzai - social and political activist (from the 2016 parliamentary era).
