= Mamadou Doumbia (footballer, born 2006) =

Malian footballer (born 2006)

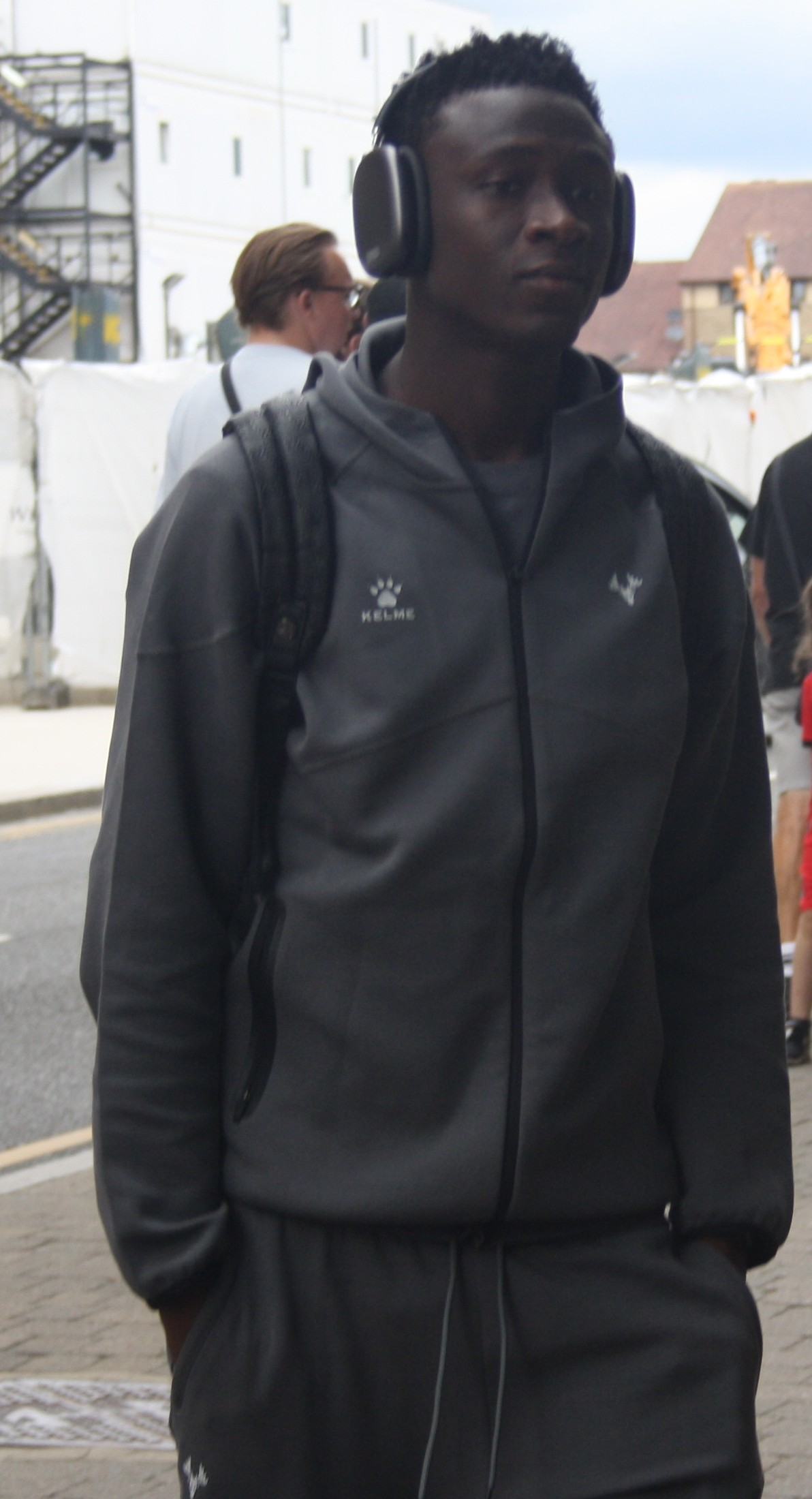
- Mamadou Doumbia in 2025.

Personal information
- Date of birth: 18 February 2006 (age 20)
- Place of birth: Bamako, Mali
- Height: 1.92 m (6 ft 4 in)
- Position: Forward

Team information
- Current team: Watford
- Number: 20

Youth career
- –2024: AS Black Stars

Senior career*
Years	Team	Apps	(Gls)
2024–	Watford	62	(8)

International career^{‡}
2023	Mali U17	9	(8)
2024–	Mali	8	(1)
Medal record
Men's football
Representing Mali
FIFA U-17 World Cup
Third place	2023 Indonesia
- * Club domestic league appearances and goals as of 15 October 2026 ‡ National team caps and goals as of 4 October 2026

Mamadou Doumbia (born 18 February 2006) is a Malian professional footballer who plays as a forward for EFL Championship club Watford and the Mali national team.

== Club career ==
Doumbia signed for English club Watford in February 2024, on a six-year contract, and officially joined on 1 July 2024. Doumbia made his senior debut on 13 August 2024, coming on as a substitute for Mileta Rajović in a 5–0 EFL Cup victory over Milton Keynes Dons.

On 5 April 2025, Mamadou scored his first EFL Championship goal in a 2–1 loss against Bristol City.

== International career ==
=== Youth ===
==== U-17 Africa Cup of Nations ====
In the 2023 U-17 Africa Cup of Nations Doumbia played Mali's first game, 1 May, in a 1–0 win over Burkina Faso scoring the only goal. He went on to score in four consecutive games as his team progressed to the semi-final in which they lost on penalties to Morocco. Following his performance, he was named in the best XI squad for the tournament and finished as the second-highest top goalscorer.

==== U-17 World Cup ====
In November 2023, Mamadou Doumbia was selected to take part in the 2023 FIFA U-17 World Cup. He scored a hat-trick for Mali in their opening game against Uzbekistan earning the player of the match award. Mali reached the semi-final where they lost to France 2–1 and in the third place play-off, Doumbia scored the second goal in a 3–0 win over Argentina granting Mali a third finish in the tournament.

=== Senior ===
Doumbia made his international debut for Mali at 18 years old in a 2–0 win against Nigeria in a friendly on the 26 March 2024, coming on as a substitute in additional time.

On 19 November 2024, Doumbia scored his first senior international goal in the 89th minute against Eswatini in a 6-0 score line during a 2025 Africa Cup of Nations qualification match.

On 11 December 2025, Doumbia was called up to the Mali squad for the 2025 Africa Cup of Nations.

== Style of play ==
Doumbia is a modern target man praised for his instinct, movement, and composure. He excels in linking play, making powerful runs, and maintaining possession with his strength and technique. His teammate Ange Martial Tia compared him to Erling Haaland, noting his versatility and effectiveness both in the air and on the ground.

== Personal life ==
Doumbia is a follower of Islam and fasts during Ramadan.

== Career statistics ==
=== Club ===
As of match played 24 October 2026

Appearances and goals by club, season and competition
Club	Season	League			FA Cup		League Cup		Other		Total	
Club	Season	Division	Apps	Goals	Apps	Goals	Apps	Goals	Apps	Goals	Apps	Goals
Watford	2024–25	Championship	19	2	1	0	2	0	—		22	2
Watford	2025–26	Championship	33	4	0	0	0	0	—		33	4
Watford	2026–27	Championship	12	1	0	0	2	1	—		14	2
Career total			64	7	1	0	4	1	—		69	8

=== International ===
As of match played 4 October 2026

Appearances and goals by national team and year
National team	Year	Apps	Goals	
Mali	2024	4	1	
Mali	2025	2	0	
Mali	2026	2	0	
Mali	Total		8	1

Scores and results list Mali's goal tally first, score column indicates score after each Doumbia goal.

List of international goals scored by Mamadou Doumbia
No.	Date	Venue	Opponent	Score	Result	Competition
1	19 November 2024	Stade du 26 Mars, Bamako, Mali	Eswatini	6–0	6–0	2025 Africa Cup of Nations qualification

== Honours ==
Mali U17

- U-17 Africa Cup of Nations fourth place: 2023
- FIFA U-17 World Cup third place: 2023
