= Abdul Qayyum Kochai =

Afghan diplomat

Abdul Qayoum Kochai (Pashto: عبدالقيوم کوچي) is an Afghan former diplomat. He was born in 1937 in Surkhab, Logar Province. He was an ambassador of Afghanistan to Russia.
