= Amin Nabizada =

Profesional footballer (born 2008)

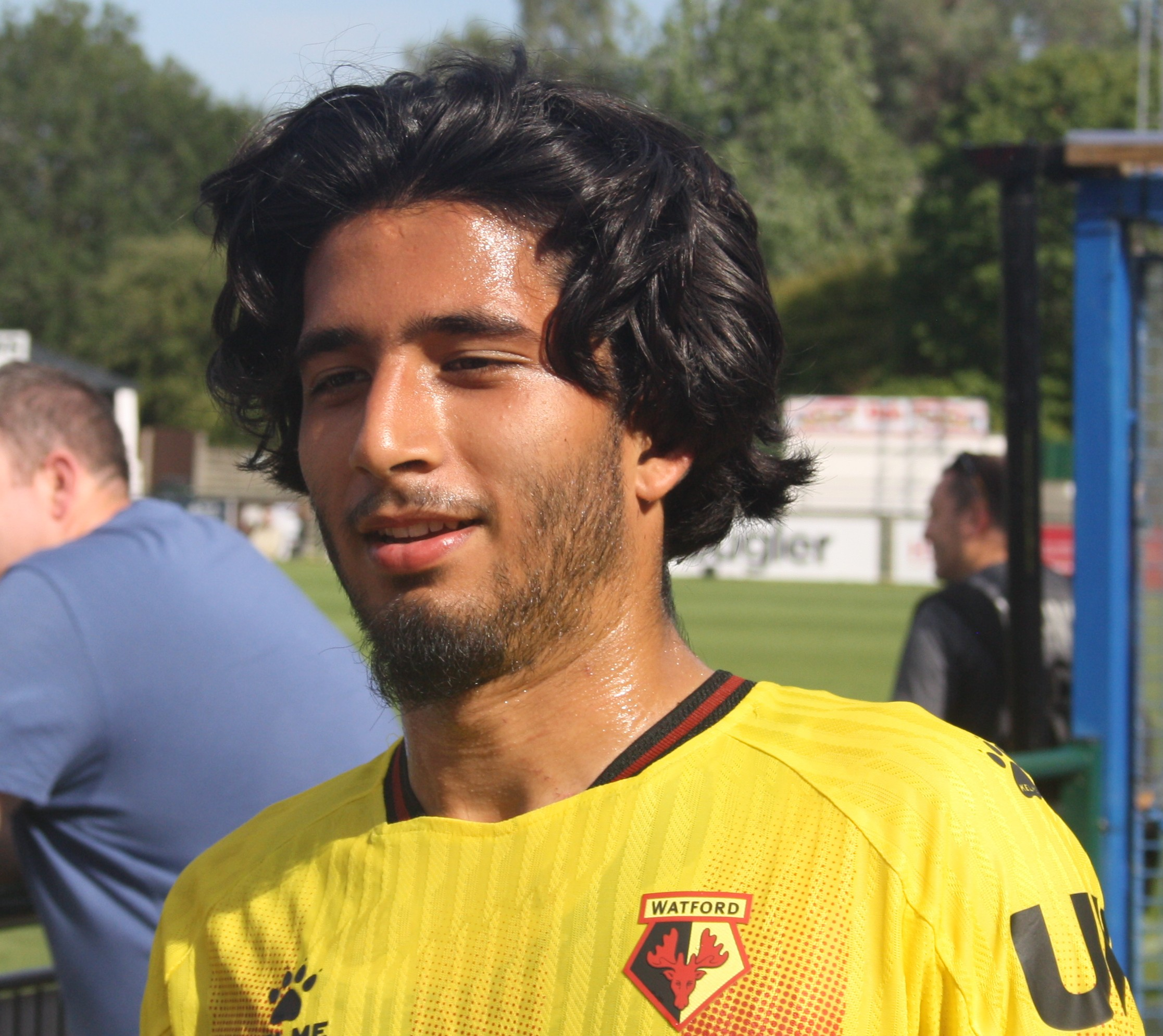
- Amin Nabizada in 2025.

Personal information
- Full name: Amin Nabizada
- Date of birth: 21 July 2007 (age 19)
- Place of birth: Walsall, England
- Height: 1.73 m (5 ft 8 in)
- Position: Forward

Team information
- Current team: Watford
- Number: 21

Youth career
- Brentford
- 2021–2025: Watford

Senior career*
Years	Team	Apps	(Gls)
2025–	Watford	13	(3)

International career^{‡}
2025	England U18	2	(0)
2026–	Afghanistan	3	(0)
- * Club domestic league appearances and goals as of 11 October 2026 (UTC) ‡ National team caps and goals as of 00:05, 2 June 2026 (UTC)

Amin Nabizada (Dari: امین نبی‌زاده; born 21 June 2007) is a professional footballer who plays for the EFL Championship club Watford as a forward. Born in England, he plays for the Afghanistan national team.

== Career ==
A youth product of Brentford, Nabizada joined the academy of Watford in 2021. On 26 June 2023, he signed his first scholarship contract with Watford. On 21 August 2024, he signed his first professional contract with Watford after debuting with their U21s. He made his senior and professional debut as a late substitute with Watford in a 4–1 FA Cup loss to Fulham on 9 January 2025.

He scored his first goal for Watford against Southampton in the first game of the EFL Championship 2026–27 season.

== International career ==
Born in England, Nabizada is of Afghan descent. On 18 March 2024, he was called up to the Afghanistan national team for FIFA World Cup qualifiers versus India. He was called up to the England U18s for a set of friendlies in May 2025.

Nabizada was again called up to the Afghanistan national team for the 2026 Diamond Jubilee International Football Tournament, and made his debut in a 1–0 win over Maldives on 1 June 2026.

== Career statistics ==
As of match played 1 September 2026

Appearances and goals by club, season and competition
Club	Season	League			FA Cup		EFL Cup		Other		Total	
Club	Season	Division	Apps	Goals	Apps	Goals	Apps	Goals	Apps	Goals	Apps	Goals
Watford	2024–25	Championship	1	0	1	0	0	0	—		2	0
Watford	2025–26	Championship	3	0	0	0	0	0	—		3	0
Watford	2026–27	Championship	4	2	0	0	2	0	—		6	2
Watford	Total		8	2	1	0	2	0	0	0	11	2
Career total			8	2	1	0	2	0	0	0	11	2
