= 2018 Afghan parliamentary election =

- 20 and 27 October 2018

All 250 seats to the House of the People
Speaker before election
Abdul Raouf Ebrahimi
Independent
Elected Speaker
Mir Rahman Rahmani
Independent

Parliamentary elections were held in Afghanistan on Saturday 20 October 2018 to elect members of the House of the People. 3,296,643 people voted, 42% of registered voters. They had originally been scheduled for 15 October 2016, but were initially postponed to 7 July 2018, and then again to 20 October. Much of the prelude to the elections focused on the debate over reforming the country's electoral laws. The current system is one of single non-transferable vote. Kandahar's election was held on 27 October. Polls were also delayed in Ghazni, due to an intensifying Taliban insurgency in the province, and as of September 2020 still had not been held. The new Parliament was inaugurated on 26 April 2019.

== Background ==
=== Aftermath of the 2014 presidential election ===
Most of the problems have centered around pre-existing disputes within Afghanistan's coalition government between the two main candidates from the 2014 Presidential election. The overhaul of the Afghan electoral system prior to a new parliamentary election was a key part of the post-election power-sharing deal reached between President Mohammad Ashraf Ghani and Chief Executive Abdullah Abdullah. Whilst both agree in not holding an election before the process is overhauled, there is disagreement on how to proceed and who should oversee the process. Ghani's recommendation of Shukria Barakzai for the post was rejected by Abdullah, who saw her as being too close to Ghani. Simultaneously Abdullah has also been strongly opposed to the same officials overseeing the election as oversaw the 2014 Presidential election, due in part to the widespread belief that Ghani benefited from the 2014 elections irregularities compared to Abdullah. Tying into this is the fact that no officials from the election have been charged with any crime or removed. In contrast to Abdullah's more hardline calls for total overhaul, Ghani's supporters have been more supportive of more limited reforms.

=== Issues to be addressed ===
One of the major issues in need of reform has been voter registration. Afghan voters are currently not limited to voting in particular areas, meaning that they can use their 2001-issued voting cards in any polling station. Simultaneously there have been three major registrations since 2001, resulting in a total of 20 million election cards being distributed. In contrast, Afghanistan only has an estimated 12 million voters, making the number of cards in circulation a source of potential fraud. Introducing an electronic identity system is a difficult process however, with some estimating it may take up to 10 years.

The continuing failure to set a date for new elections or reform the system led to the United Nations Development Programme to cancel a multimillion-dollar project to fund Afghan electoral bodies in June 2015. The cut came at a time when Afghan aid projects were coming under increased scrutiny.

On 16 July, and following a 9-month delay, Ghani issued a decree establishing a 16-member commission to look into electoral reform. The parliaments term expired on 22 June 2015, leading President Ghani to issue a decree extending the parliament until new elections. By August 2015 the commission had begun looking at the issue of voting reform.

=== Electoral Reform Commission proposals ===
On Sunday 30 August 2015 the Electoral Reform Commission submitted their proposals, following a month of deliberation. Amongst the proposals were calls for allotting 83, or 1/3, of the Afghan parliament's 250 seats to political parties, in accordance with the parties national results. Other proposals included the restructuring of the current election commission; the creation of a clear voter identification system ahead of future polling; and moving to an electoral system that divides provinces into smaller voting districts that can be easily quarantined in case of fraud. According to The New York Times, observers felt that the proposals weighed towards the view of reform favored by Abdullah Abdullah.

Disagreements over the plan saw two members of the commission; Kawun Kakar and Shah Mahmood Miakhel, who are believed to be close to Mr. Ghani, walking out. Both criticised the plan for allocating party seats on the basis of a national constituency result. Instead, both felt that smaller, more local constituencies would offer a closer link between parliamentarians and the electorate, whilst they felt the suggested system discriminated in favour of larger, national parties. Shah Sultan Akefi, the head of the commission, rejected these claims, and argued that the proposed system was important for developing national political parties, instead of maintaining the current system of non-partisan, and ideologically divergent independent candidates.

== Process ==
Out of around 12 million eligible Afghans, there were nearly 9 million registered voters including 3 million women. There were going to be more than 21,000 polling stations where voters can cast their ballots, protected by more than 54,000 members of the security services.

== Conduct ==
The parliamentary election was held as scheduled on 20 October. A third of polling stations did not open. Reports showed that there were long lines and high voter turnout at available polling stations. Delays in the arrival of election workers also caused some polling station to remain open longer so people would be able to cast their vote. The provinces of Kandahar and Ghanzi will hold elections at a later date. Immediately after the polls closed, election workers began counting the ballots.

The chairman of the Independent Election Commission (IEC) of Afghanistan, Gulajan Bade Sayad, said more than 2 million Afghans had voted in 27 provinces by 2 p.m. local time, with at least 638,000 votes coming from Kabul. IEC officials reported that up to 4 million registered Afghan voters turned out to cast their ballot. The IEC further stated that approximately 3 million registered voters were confirmed to have cast their ballot and some suggested that numerous sums of the country's 9 million registered voters didn't exist and were based on forgery of identification. The U.N. Assistance Mission in Afghanistan (UNAMA) stated it was "encouraged by the high numbers of Afghans who turned out" and praised the efforts which were made to ensure the election would take place. Voting was also extended to 21 October, with the exemption of Kandahar and Ghanzi, and after the polls closed, Sayad announced that approximately 4 million registered Afghan voters had cast their ballot in the two days of voting.

Over 170 people were killed or wounded in bombings and rocket attacks throughout the first day of voting, with at least 18 people killed and 67 injured in blasts near polling stations in the capital, Kabul.

On 27 October 2018, Kandahar held its election.

== Turnout ==
3,296,643 people voted out of 8,663,531 registered to vote, a turnout of 38%.

Sayad stated that the IEC estimated voter turnout to be at an "impressive" 45 percent, with women participating at an "historic" fraction of 33 percent of the voters. This does not include results from the provinces of Kandahar and Ghazni, which were to hold elections at later dates.

Higher-than-expected turnout was also reported in the Kandahar election which took place on 27 October.

== Results ==
The results were to be released within 20 days of the election, and the final results by 20 December 2018. However, on 6 December, an election complaints agency invalidated all of the votes cast in Kabul Province over fraud allegations, effectively stalling the official release of results. Activist Muqadasa Ahmadzai stood for election but was not successful.

The final results were published on 14 May 2019. The postponed elections for representatives from Ghazni Province have been repeatedly delayed. Plans to hold them alongside the September 2019 presidential election did not materialize. In September 2020, President Ashraf Ghani issued a new commitment to hold the long-delayed polls in the province in the near future.

Party	General seats			Kuchi seats			Sikh and Hindu seat			Total seats	+/–
Party	Votes	%	Seats	Votes	%	Seats	Votes	%	Seats	Total seats	+/–
Independents	3,409,329	100.00	233	66,476	100.00	10	303	100.00	1	244	–5
Vacant			6							6	–
Total	3,409,329	100.00	239	66,476	100.00	10	303	100.00	1	250	+1
Registered voters/turnout	8,840,306	–									
Source: IEC, Adam Carr, IPU

== Fraud allegations ==
According to a spokesperson from the Independent Electoral Complaints Commission (IECC), their decision to annul the results from the capital could be defended for 25 different reasons - including "major fraud" and the IEC's overall mismanagement of the election.

More than one million votes had been counted in Kabul, accounting for one fourth of the four million votes cast nationwide. Under ordinary circumstances, this move would have required a new election to take place within seven days of the IECC's decision. Rather than permit a new election however, the IEC denounced the ruling and announced its intent to certify the results of Kabul's vote in spite of the IECC's higher authority over the matter.

Even before the fraud allegations were levied, IEC officials predicted that counting the votes would be a difficult and time-consuming task, as some 800 candidates had participated in the Kabul elections, and election officials scan the votes for each candidate manually. With the fraud allegations as they are, IEC officials have deigned to announce a new date by which the final results will be announced.

According to the Election and Transparency Watch Organization of Afghanistan, the IEC has delayed announcing the election results out of fear that the validity of the entire vote would be challenged across Afghanistan. Given the complaints of fraud the commission already received on election day, observers speculate that the IEC is delaying the vote to avoid receiving further backlash.

In response to these delays and the actions of the IEC over the last few months, the IECC called for the firing of several IEC staff members. On 12 February 2019, Afghanistan's coalition government fired all the commissioners responsible for directing the fraud-tainted election. Though there has been no official news of the fate of the 2018 election ballots, if the results are re-examined or canceled, it could further delay preparations for the upcoming presidential election.

Meanwhile, opposition politicians are pushing to postpone the presidential election and form an interim government to stabilize the country. As part of a peace deal in the works, such a government could include the Taliban as well. President Ashraf Ghani has insisted that the 2019 presidential election, already pushed back from April to July, be held on time.

== Inauguration of new parliament ==
Despite delays, Afghanistan's new Parliament was officially inaugurated on 26 April 2019, six months after the election was held. Afghanistan President Ashraf Ghani presided over the swearing-in ceremony. The new Parliament is also Afghanistan's 17th Parliament. The same day, final election results from four Afghanistan provinces whose results had been delayed revealed that House of the People speaker Abdul Rauf Ibrahimi of Kunduz had been re-elected to the House of the People as well. The five-year term of the new House of the People would have ended in 2023.
