= 2021–22 Watford F.C. season =

English football team season

Watford
2021–22 season
- Chairman: Scott Duxbury
- Head coach: Xisco (until 3 October); Claudio Ranieri (from 4 October to 24 January); Roy Hodgson (from 25 January)
- Stadium: Vicarage Road
- Premier League: 19th (relegated)
- FA Cup: Third round
- EFL Cup: Third round
- Top goalscorer: League: Emmanuel Dennis (10); All: Emmanuel Dennis (10)
Home colours	Away colours	Third colours

The 2021–22 season was the 123rd season in existence of Watford Football Club and their first season back in the Premier League following their immediate return with promotion from the Championship in the previous season. Watford also competed in the FA Cup and EFL Cup.

This season was the first, since 2009–10 without the club's record Premier League goalscorer Troy Deeney who joined Birmingham City after his contract expired.

== Managerial changes ==
On 3 October, the Hornets sacked head coach Xisco. A day later, Claudio Ranieri was appointed the club's new Head Coach, on a two-year contract.

Ranieri was sacked on 24 January and was replaced the following day by Roy Hodgson. Watford would go on to record 2 wins and remain winless in Hodgson's tenure and be relegated in May 2022 following a 1–0 defeat to Crystal Palace.

== Players ==
=== Current squad ===
As of 22 May 2022.

Squad No.	Name	Nationality	Position	Age	Since	Ends	Signed from	Apps	Goals
Goalkeepers
1	Ben Foster	(England)	GK	39	2018	2022	(England) West Brom	207	0
26	Daniel Bachmann	(Austria)	GK	28	2017	2024	(England) Stoke	41	0
35	Rob Elliot	(Republic of Ireland)	GK	36	2021	2023	(England) Newcastle	1	0
Defenders
2	Jeremy Ngakia	(England)	RB	21	2020	2024	(England) West Ham	45	0
3	Danny Rose	(England)	LB	32	2021	2023	(England) Tottenham	16	0
5	William Troost-Ekong	(Nigeria)	CB	28	2020	2025	(Italy) Udinese	51	1
11	Adam Masina	(Morocco)	LB	28	2018	2023	(Italy) Bologna	90	3
13	Nicolas Nkoulou	(Cameroon)	CB	32	2021	2022	(Italy) Torino	3	0
14	Hassane Kamara	(Ivory Coast)	LB	28	2022	2025	(France) Nice	19	1
15	Craig Cathcart	(Northern Ireland)	CB	33	2014	2023	(England) Blackpool	221	8
21	Kiko Femenía	(Spain)	RB	31	2017	2024	(Spain) Alavés	151	2
22	Samir	(Brazil)	CB	27	2022	2025	(Italy) Udinese	19	0
27	Christian Kabasele	(Belgium)	CB	31	2016	2024	(Belgium) Genk	139	6
31	Francisco Sierralta	(Chile)	CB	25	2020	2027	(Italy) Udinese	37	1
42	James Morris	(England)	LB	20	2021	2024	(England) Southampton	1	0
Midfielders
4	Oghenekaro Etebo	(Nigeria)	CM	26	2021	2022	(England) Stoke (loan)	9	0
6	Imrân Louza	(Morocco)	CM	23	2021	2026	(France) Nantes	22	0
8	Tom Cleverley	(England)	CM	33	2017	2023	(England) Everton	177	18
16	Dan Gosling	(England)	CM	32	2021	2023	(England) Bournemouth	19	3
19	Moussa Sissoko	(France)	CDM	33	2021	2023	(England) Tottenham	38	2
33	Juraj Kucka	(Slovakia)	CM	35	2021	2023	(Italy) Parma	27	1
39	Edo Kayembe	(Democratic Republic of the Congo)	CDM	24	2022	2026	(Belgium) Eupen	13	0
45	Kamil Conteh	(England)	CM	19	2018	2022	(England) Academy	1	0
Forwards
7	Joshua King	(Norway)	ST	30	2021	2023	(England) Everton	33	5
10	João Pedro	(Brazil)	ST	20	2020	2027	(Brazil) Fluminense	74	13
12	Ken Sema	(Sweden)	LW	28	2018	2026	(Sweden) Östersunds	85	7
23	Ismaïla Sarr	(Senegal)	RW	24	2019	2024	(France) Rennes	92	24
25	Emmanuel Dennis	(Nigeria)	ST	24	2021	2026	(Belgium) Club Brugge	35	10
28	Samuel Kalu	(Nigeria)	RW	24	2022	2025	(France) Bordeaux	4	0
29	Cucho Hernández	(Colombia)	LW	23	2017	2024	(Spain) Granada	28	5
34	Kwadwo Baah	(Germany)	LW	19	2021	2026	(England) Rochdale	0	0
47	Shaq Forde	(England)	ST	18	2012	2022	(England) Academy	1	0

== Transfers ==
=== Transfers in ===
Date	Position	Nationality	Name	From	Fee	Ref.
17 May 2021	LW	(Germany)	Kwadwo Baah	(England) Rochdale	Undisclosed	
27 May 2021	CB	(England)	Mattie Pollock	(England) Grimsby Town	Undisclosed	
2 June 2021	CM	(Morocco)	Imran Louza	(France) Nantes	Undisclosed	
21 June 2021	CF	(Nigeria)	Emmanuel Dennis	(Belgium) Club Brugge	Undisclosed	
1 July 2021	CF	(England)	Ashley Fletcher	(England) Middlesbrough	Free transfer	
1 July 2021	LB	(England)	Danny Rose	(England) Tottenham Hotspur	Free transfer	
9 July 2021	SS	(Norway)	Joshua King	(England) Everton	Free transfer	
9 July 2021	CF	(Scotland)	Dapo Mebude	(Scotland) Rangers	Undisclosed	
14 July 2021	GK	(Scotland)	Vincent Angelini	(Scotland) Celtic	Free transfer	
5 August 2021	LB	(England)	James Morris	(England) Southampton	Free transfer	
6 August 2021	CM	(Slovakia)	Juraj Kucka	(Italy) Parma	Undisclosed	
27 August 2021	CM	(France)	Moussa Sissoko	(England) Tottenham Hotspur	£3,000,000	
23 September 2021	CF	(England)	Jimiel Chikukwa	(England) Leeds United	Free transfer	
7 October 2021	CB	(Cameroon)	Nicolas Nkoulou	(Italy) Torino	Free transfer	
1 January 2022	GK	(Nigeria)	Maduka Okoye	(Netherlands) Sparta Rotterdam	Undisclosed	
4 January 2022	LB	(Ivory Coast)	Hassane Kamara	(France) Nice	£4,000,000	
6 January 2022	CB	(Brazil)	Samir	(Italy) Udinese	Undisclosed	
7 January 2022	DM	(Democratic Republic of the Congo)	Edo Kayembe	(Belgium) KAS Eupen	Undisclosed	
26 January 2022	RW	(Nigeria)	Samuel Kalu	(France) Bordeaux	Undisclosed	

=== Transfers out ===
Date	Position	Nationality	Name	To	Fee	Ref.
9 June 2021	CB	(England)	Craig Dawson	(England) West Ham United	£2,000,000	
24 June 2021	CB	(England)	Ben Wilmot	(England) Stoke City	Undisclosed	
30 June 2021	CB	(England)	Mason Barrett	Unattached	Released	
30 June 2021	AM	(Netherlands)	Mitchel Bergkamp	Unattached	Released	
30 June 2021	GK	(England)	Mac Chisholm	(England) West Bromwich Albion	Released (scholar)	
30 June 2021	CF	(England)	Sam Dalby	(England) Southend United	Released	
30 June 2021	RM	(England)	Harry Forster	(England) Bromley	Released	
30 June 2021	CF	(England)	Thomas Horsewood	(England) Hertford Town	Released (scholar)	
30 June 2021	LB	(Morocco)	Achraf Lazaar	(Portugal) Portimonense	Released	
30 June 2021	CM	(Kenya)	Henry Ochieng	(England) Billericay Town	Released	
30 June 2021	AM	(Scotland)	Phoenix Patterson	(Republic of Ireland) Waterford	Released	
30 June 2021	CB	(England)	Teddy Perkins	(England) Welling United	Released	
30 June 2021	DM	(Colombia)	Carlos Sánchez	(Colombia) Santa Fe	Released	
30 June 2021	CF	(England)	Jerome Sinclair	Unattached	Released	
30 June 2021	CB	(Guyana)	Bayli Spencer-Adams	(England) Leicester City	Released	
30 June 2021	CB	(England)	Maxwell Statham	(England) Welling United	Released	
30 June 2021	LB	(England)	Toby Stevenson	(England) Bromley	Released	
30 June 2021	FW	(England)	Max Thompson	Unattached	Released (scholar)	
14 July 2021	DF	(England)	James Debayo	(England) Leeds United	Undisclosed	
16 July 2021	LB	(Finland)	Tomas Galvez	(England) Manchester City	Undisclosed	
16 July 2021	MF	(Republic of Ireland)	Bosun Lawal	(Scotland) Celtic	Undisclosed	
9 August 2021	CF	(Serbia)	Filip Stuparević	(Serbia) Metalac Gornji Milanovac	Free transfer	
14 August 2021	CF	(Croatia)	Stipe Perica	(Israel) Maccabi Tel Aviv	Undisclosed	
26 August 2021	CF	(Nigeria)	Isaac Success	(Italy) Udinese	Undisclosed	
28 August 2021	CM	(England)	Will Hughes	(England) Crystal Palace	Undisclosed	
30 August 2021	CF	(England)	Troy Deeney	(England) Birmingham City	Free transfer	
31 August 2021	DM	(England)	Nathaniel Chalobah	(England) Fulham	Undisclosed	
31 August 2021	RB	(Spain)	Marc Navarro	Unattached	Released	

=== Loans in ===
Date from	Position	Nationality	Name	From	Date until	Ref.
9 July 2021	CM	(Nigeria)	Peter Etebo	(England) Stoke City	End of season	
19 August 2021	CM	(Turkey)	Ozan Tufan	(Turkey) Fenerbahçe	2 February 2022 (Note: On 2 February, Tufan's loan was terminated by mutual consent.)	

=== Loans out ===
Date from	Position	Nationality	Name	To	Date until	Ref.
1 July 2021	RW	(Argentina)	Ignacio Pussetto	(Italy) Udinese	End of season	
1 July 2021	CB	(Colombia)	Jorge Segura	(Colombia) América de Cali	End of season	
9 July 2021	AM	(Colombia)	Juergen Elitim	(Spain) Deportivo La Coruña	End of season	
12 July 2021	CF	(Venezuela)	Adalberto Peñaranda	(Spain) Las Palmas	End of season	
19 July 2021	CF	(Turkey)	Tiago Çukur	(England) Doncaster Rovers	11 January 2022 (Note: On 11 January, Çukur was recalled from his loan spell at Doncaster.)	
20 July 2021	GK	(England)	Myles Roberts	(England) Concord Rangers	End of season	
23 July 2021	GK	(England)	Adam Parkes	(England) Dover Athletic	End of season	
23 July 2021	CM	(Trinidad and Tobago)	Daniel Phillips	(England) Gillingham	End of season	
30 July 2021	GK	(England)	Alfie Marriott	(England) Kings Langley	January 2022	
4 August 2021	GK	(England)	Dante Baptiste	(England) Farnborough	End of season	
4 August 2021	CF	(Scotland)	Dapo Mebude	(England) AFC Wimbledon	End of season	
6 August 2021	GK	(Sweden)	Pontus Dahlberg	(England) Doncaster Rovers	14 January 2022 (Note: On 14 January, Dahlberg was recalled early from his loan spell at Doncaster.)	
7 August 2021	RW	(Denmark)	Philip Zinckernagel	(England) Nottingham Forest	End of season	
12 August 2021	CM	(Nigeria)	Tom Dele-Bashiru	(England) Reading	End of season	
12 August 2021	MF	(England)	Dominic Hutchinson	(England) Eastbourne Borough	End of season	
13 August 2021	RW	(Scotland)	Sonny Blu Lo-Everton	(England) Yeovil Town	End of season	
17 August 2021	LW	(England)	Joseph Hungbo	(Scotland) Ross County	End of season	
30 August 2021	CB	(England)	Mattie Pollock	(England) Cheltenham Town	End of season	
31 August 2021	CM	(Colombia)	Jaime Alvarado	(Spain) Racing de Ferrol	End of season	
31 August 2021	CF	(Jamaica)	Andre Gray	(England) Queens Park Rangers	End of season	
31 August 2021	CM	(Portugal)	Domingos Quina	(England) Fulham	1 February 2022 (Note: On 1 February, Quina was recalled to facilitate a loan to Barnsley.)	
2 October 2021	CB	(England)	Will Hall	(England) Kings Langley	Undisclosed	
18 December 2021	CM	(England)	Adian Manning	(England) Kings Langley	Undisclosed	
1 January 2022	GK	(Nigeria)	Maduka Okoye	(Netherlands) Sparta Rotterdam	End of season	
14 January 2022	GK	(Sweden)	Pontus Dahlberg	(England) Gillingham	End of season	
22 January 2022	MF	(Northern Ireland)	JJ McKiernan	(Republic of Ireland) Bohemians	13 November 2022	
23 January 2022	CF	(Republic of Ireland)	Ryan Cassidy	(Republic of Ireland) Bohemians	End of season	
1 February 2022	CM	(Portugal)	Domingos Quina	(England) Barnsley	End of season	
5 February 2022	CM	(England)	Kamil Conteh	(England) Braintree Town	End of season	
28 February 2022	CF	(England)	Ashley Fletcher	(United States) New York Red Bulls	End of season	
1 March 2022	MF	(England)	Adian Manning	(England) Biggleswade Town	26 March 2022	

== Pre-season and friendlies ==
Watford announced they would play friendlies against West Bromwich Albion, Stevenage Nantes, and Udinese as part of their pre-season schedule.

Win Draw Loss Fixtures

14 July 2021 Friendly	Watford	3–2	Millwall	London Colney
14:00 BST	Quina 36'; Masina 60'; Fletcher 86'	Report	Smith 57'; Wallace 59'	Stadium: UCL Sports Ground; Attendance: 0 (Behind-closed-doors)

17 July 2021 Friendly	Watford	2–1	Colchester United	London Colney
13:00 BST	Sarr (?); Mebude (?)	Report	Judge (?)	Stadium: UCL Sports Ground; Attendance: 0 (Behind-closed-doors)

17 July 2021 Friendly	Watford	2–0	Colchester United	London Colney
15:00 BST	Hernández (?); Gosling (?)	Report		Stadium: UCL Sports Ground; Attendance: 0 (Behind-closed-doors)

24 July 2021 Friendly	Watford	1–3	Brentford	London Colney
12:00 BST	Wise (?)	Report	Toney; Dervişoğlu (?)	Stadium: UCL Sports Ground; Attendance: 0 (Behind-closed-doors)

24 July 2021 Friendly	Watford	0–0	West Bromwich Albion	Watford
15:00 BST		Report		Stadium: Vicarage Road

27 July 2021 Friendly	Stevenage	1–1	Watford	Stevenage
19:45 BST	Reid 2'	Report	Sema 37'	Stadium: Lamex Stadium

28 July 2021 Friendly	Arsenal	4–1	Watford	London Colney
10:00 BST	Nketiah (?); Lacazette (?); Tierney (?); Azeez (?)	Report	Zinckernagel 40'	Stadium: Arsenal Training Centre; Attendance: 0 (Behind-closed-doors)

4 August 2021 Friendly	Watford	4–0	Doncaster Rovers	Burton upon Trent
BST	Etebo 5'; Deeney 15'; Gosling 19'; Fletcher 60' (pen.)	Report		Stadium: St George's Park National Football Centre; Attendance: 0 (Behind-closed-doors)

7 August 2021 Friendly	Crystal Palace	3–1	Watford	Selhurst
15:00 BST	Zaha 30' (pen.), 54'; McArthur (yellow card) 50'; Benteke 86'		Deeney 83'	Stadium: Selhurst Park

== Competitions ==
=== Premier League ===
==== League table ====
Pos	Team	Pld	W	D	L	GF	GA	GD	Pts	Qualification or relegation
16	Everton	38	11	6	21	43	66	−23	39	
17	Leeds United	38	9	11	18	42	79	−37	38	
18	Burnley (R)	38	7	14	17	34	53	−19	35	Relegation to EFL Championship
19	Watford (R)	38	6	5	27	34	77	−43	23	Relegation to EFL Championship
20	Norwich City (R)	38	5	7	26	23	84	−61	22	Relegation to EFL Championship

Source: Premier League
Rules for classification: 1) Points; 2) Goal difference; 3) Goals scored; 4) If the champions, relegated teams or qualified teams for UEFA competitions cannot be determined by rules 1 to 3, rules 4.1 to 4.3 are applied – 4.1) Points gained in head-to-head record between such teams; 4.2) Away goals scored in head-to-head record between such teams; 4.3) Play-offs
(R) Relegated

==== Results summary ====
Overall								Home						Away					
Pld	W	D	L	GF	GA	GD	Pts	W	D	L	GF	GA	GD	W	D	L	GF	GA	GD
38	6	5	27	34	76	−42	23	2	2	15	17	46	−29	4	3	12	17	30	−13

Source: Premier League

==== Results by matchday ====
Matchday	1	2	3	4	5	6	7	8	9	10	11	12	13	14	15	16	17	18	19	20	21	22	23	24	25	26	27	28	29	30	31	32	33	34	35	36	37	38
Ground	H	A	A	H	A	H	A	H	A	H	A	H	A	H	H	A	A	H	A	H	H	A	H	A	H	A	A	H	A	H	A	H	H	A	H	A	H	A
Result	W	L	L	L	W	D	L	L	W	L	L	W	L	L	L	L	D	L	L	L	L	D	L	L	L	W	D	L	W	L	L	L	L	L	L	D	L	L
Position	7	11	12	15	11	12	15	16	14	16	17	16	16	17	17	17	17	17	17	17	17	17	18	19	19	18	19	19	18	18	19	19	19	19	19	19	19	19

Source: Premier League
A = Away; H = Home; W = Win; D = Draw; L = Loss

==== Matches ====
The league fixtures were announced on 16 June 2021.

14 August 2021 1	Watford	3–2	Aston Villa	Watford
15:00 BST	Dennis 10'; Kucka (yellow card) 23'; Sarr 42'; Sema (yellow card) 55'; Hernández 67'; Etebo (yellow card) 86'	Report	Mings (yellow card) 54'; McGinn 70'; Ings 90+7' (pen.)	Stadium: Vicarage Road; Attendance: 20,051; Referee: Mike Dean

21 August 2021 2	Brighton & Hove Albion	2–0	Watford	Falmer
17:30 BST	Duffy 10', (yellow card) 65'; Maupay 41'; Webster (yellow card) 62'; Mwepu (yellow card) 86'; March (yellow card) 90+1'	Report		Stadium: Falmer Stadium; Attendance: 29,405; Referee: Anthony Taylor
Note: Live on Sky Sports

29 August 2021 3	Tottenham Hotspur	1–0	Watford	Tottenham
14:00 BST	Son Heung-min 42'; Kane (yellow card) 45+1'; Alli (yellow card) 61'; Skipp (yellow card) 85'	Report	Etebo (yellow card) 29'; Sissoko (yellow card) 54'; Dennis (yellow card) 90+4'	Stadium: Tottenham Hotspur Stadium; Attendance: 57,672; Referee: Andre Marriner

11 September 2021 4	Watford	0–2	Wolverhampton Wanderers	Watford
15:00 BST	Etebo (yellow card) 13'; Rose (yellow card) 67'; Dennis (yellow card) 68'	Report	Marçal (yellow card) 68'; Sierralta 74' (o.g.); Hwang Hee-chan 83'; Jiménez (yellow card) 90+2'; Kilman (yellow card) 90+5'	Stadium: Vicarage Road; Attendance: 20,019; Referee: Peter Bankes

18 September 2021 5	Norwich City	1–3	Watford	Norwich
15:00 BST	Pukki 35'; Williams (yellow card) 90+5'	Report	Dennis 17'; Cathcart (yellow card) 37'; Sarr 63', 80'	Stadium: Carrow Road; Attendance: 26,649; Referee: Robert Jones

25 September 2021 6	Watford	1–1	Newcastle United	Watford
15:00 BST	Dennis (yellow card) 17'; Troost-Ekong (yellow card) 40'; Rose (yellow card) 56'; Cathcart (yellow card) 69'; Sarr 72'	Report	Manquillo (yellow card) 18'; Longstaff 23'; Ritchie (yellow card) 30'; Darlow (yellow card) 90+1'	Stadium: Vicarage Road; Attendance: 20,650; Referee: Jarred Gillett

2 October 2021 7	Leeds United	1–0	Watford	Leeds
15:00 BST	Llorente 18'	Report	Femenía (yellow card) 59'; Sarr (yellow card) 65'; Dennis (yellow card) 90'	Stadium: Elland Road; Attendance: 36,261; Referee: Simon Hooper

16 October 2021 8	Watford	0–5	Liverpool	Watford
12:30 BST		Report	Mané 8'; Firmino 37', 52', 90+1'; Salah 54'	Stadium: Vicarage Road; Attendance: 21,085; Referee: Jonathan Moss

23 October 2021 9	Everton	2–5	Watford	Walton
15:00 BST	Davies 3'; Digne (yellow card) 17'; Allan (yellow card) 54'; Richarlison 63', (yellow card) 72'; Rondón (yellow card) 90+3'	Report	King 13', 80', 86', (yellow card) 81'; Troost-Ekong (yellow card) 44'; Kucka 78'; Dennis (yellow card) 70', (goal) 90+1'	Stadium: Goodison Park; Attendance: 38,834; Referee: Graham Scott

30 October 2021 10	Watford	0–1	Southampton	Watford
15:00 BST	João Pedro (yellow card) 45+2'; Kucka (yellow card) 76'	Report	Adams 20'; Salisu (yellow card) 55'; Ward-Prowse (yellow card) 58'	Stadium: Vicarage Road; Attendance: 20,869; Referee: Peter Bankes

7 November 2021 11	Arsenal	1–0	Watford	Holloway
14:00 GMT	Sambi Lokonga (yellow card) 20'; Tomiyasu (yellow card) 30'; Aubameyang (penalty missed) 36', (yellow card) 52'; Smith Rowe 56'; Gabriel (yellow card) 80'	Report	King (yellow card) 10'; Kucka (yellow card) 31' (yellow-red card) 89'; Sissoko (yellow card) 54'	Stadium: Emirates Stadium; Attendance: 59,833; Referee: Kevin Friend

20 November 2021 12	Watford	4–1	Manchester United	Watford
15:00 GMT	Sarr (penalty missed) 11', 44'; King 28'; Louza (yellow card) 45'; João Pedro 90+2'; Dennis 90+6', (yellow card) 90+7'	Report	McTominay (yellow card) 19'; Van de Beek 50'; Maguire (yellow card) 62' (yellow-red card) 69'	Stadium: Vicarage Road; Attendance: 21,087; Referee: Jonathan Moss

28 November 2021 13	Leicester City	4–2	Watford	Leicester
14:00 GMT	Maddison 16'; Vardy 34', 42'; Lookman 68'	Report	King 30' (pen.); Dennis 61'	Stadium: King Power Stadium; Attendance: 34,310; Referee: Andrew Madley

1 December 2021 14	Watford	1–2	Chelsea	Watford
19:30 GMT	Dennis 43'; Louza (yellow card) 45'; Troost-Ekong (yellow card) 45+4'; Cleverley (yellow card) 84'; Rose (yellow card) 84'	Report	Saúl (yellow card) 16'; Mount 29'; Alonso (yellow card) 45+2'; Ziyech (yellow card) 65', (goal) 72'	Stadium: Vicarage Road; Attendance: 20,388; Referee: David Coote

4 December 2021 15	Watford	1–3	Manchester City	Watford
17:30 GMT	King (yellow card) 7'; Rose (yellow card) 31'; Hernández 74'; Cathcart (yellow card) 85'	Report	Sterling 4'; Silva 31', 63'	Stadium: Vicarage Road; Attendance: 20,673; Referee: Simon Hooper

10 December 2021 16	Brentford	2–1	Watford	Brentford
20:00 GMT	Janelt (yellow card) 68'; Jansson (yellow card) 70', (goal) 84'; Goode (yellow card) 81'; Onyeka (yellow card) 90+1'; Mbeumo 90+6' (pen.)	Report	Dennis 24'	Stadium: Brentford Community Stadium; Attendance: 16,861; Referee: Michael Oliver

28 December 2021 17	Watford	1–4	West Ham United	Watford
15:00 GMT	Dennis 4'	Report	Souček 27'; Benrahma 29'; Noble 58' (pen.); Dawson (yellow card) 81'; Vlašić 90+2'	Stadium: Vicarage Road; Attendance: 20,073; Referee: Darren England

1 January 2022 18	Watford	0–1	Tottenham Hotspur	Watford
15:00 GMT		Report	Skipp (yellow card) 61'; Sánchez 90+6'	Stadium: Vicarage Road; Attendance: 20,391; Referee: Robert Jones

15 January 2022 19	Newcastle United	1–1	Watford	Newcastle upon Tyne
15:00 GMT	Shelvey (yellow card) 6'; Saint-Maximin 49'; Fraser (yellow card) 53'; Dummett (yellow card) 71'	Report	Sissoko (yellow card) 51'; João Pedro 88'; Samir (yellow card) 90'	Stadium: St James' Park; Attendance: 52,223; Referee: Paul Tierney

21 January 2022 20	Watford	0–3	Norwich City	Watford
20:00 GMT	Dennis (yellow card) 36' (yellow-red card) 78'	Report	McLean (yellow card) 38'; Sargent 51', 74'; Kucka 90+2' (o.g.)	Stadium: Vicarage Road; Attendance: 20,782; Referee: Mike Dean

5 February 2022 21	Burnley	0–0	Watford	Burnley
18:00 GMT	Stephens (yellow card) 45'	Report	King (yellow card) 20'; Cleverley (yellow card) 90+1'	Stadium: Turf Moor; Attendance: 19,527; Referee: Craig Pawson
Note: The match was postponed due to a COVID-19 outbreak within Watford's squad. It was rescheduled to 5 February 2022.

8 February 2022 22	West Ham United	1–0	Watford	Stratford
19:45 GMT	Bowen 68'; Coufal (yellow card) 83'	Report		Stadium: London Stadium; Attendance: 59,581; Referee: Martin Atkinson

12 February 2022 23	Watford	0–2	Brighton & Hove Albion	Watford
15:00 GMT	Dennis (yellow card) 56'; Kamara (yellow card) 65'; Louza (yellow card) 90+2'	Report	Dunk (yellow card) 25'; Maupay 44'; Lamptey (yellow card) 75'; Webster 82'	Stadium: Vicarage Road; Attendance: 20,795; Referee: Jonathan Moss

19 February 2022 24	Aston Villa	0–1	Watford	Aston
15:00 GMT	Cash (yellow card) 57'	Report	Sarr (yellow card) 66'; Dennis 78'; Kamara (yellow card) 82'	Stadium: Villa Park; Attendance: 42,000; Referee: Robert Jones

23 February 2022 25	Watford	1–4	Crystal Palace	Watford
19:30 GMT	Sissoko 18'; Samir (yellow card) 40'; Femenía (yellow card) 61'	Report	Mateta 15'; Gallagher 42'; Kouyaté (yellow card) 44'; Zaha 85', 90'	Stadium: Vicarage Road; Attendance: 20,012; Referee: Andre Marriner
Note: The match, originally scheduled for 18 December 2021, was postponed due to a COVID-19 outbreak within Watford's squad.

26 February 2022 26	Manchester United	0–0	Watford	Manchester
15:00 GMT		Report		Stadium: Old Trafford; Attendance: 73,152; Referee: Kevin Friend

6 March 2022 27	Watford	2–3	Arsenal	Watford
14:00 GMT	Hernández 11', (yellow card) 90+6'; Sissoko 87'	Report	Ødegaard 5'; Saka 30'; Martinelli 52'; Cédric (yellow card) 58'; Nketiah (yellow card) 90+3'	Stadium: Vicarage Road; Attendance: 21,142; Referee: Craig Pawson

10 March 2022 28	Wolverhampton Wanderers	4–0	Watford	Wolverhampton
19:30 GMT	Jiménez 13'; Hernández 18' (o.g.); Podence 21'; Aït-Nouri (yellow card) 35'; Saïss (yellow card) 59'; Neves 85'	Report	Louza (yellow card) 19'; Samir (yellow card) 40'	Stadium: Molineux Stadium; Attendance: 29,658; Referee: Darren England
Note: The match, originally scheduled for 26 December 2021, was postponed due to a COVID-19 outbreak within Watford's squad.

13 March 2022 29	Southampton	1–2	Watford	Southampton
14:00 GMT	Elyounoussi 45'; Perraud (yellow card) 48'; Romeu (yellow card) 65'; Bednarek (yellow card) 76'	Report	Hernández 14', 34', (yellow card) 60'; Sissoko (yellow card) 86'	Stadium: St Mary's Stadium; Attendance: 28,863; Referee: Graham Scott

2 April 2022 30	Liverpool	2–0	Watford	Liverpool
12:30 BST	Jota 22'; Gomez (yellow card) 45+1'; Fabinho 89' (pen.)	Report	Hernández (yellow card) 59'	Stadium: Anfield; Attendance: 53,104; Referee: Stuart Attwell

9 April 2022 31	Watford	0–3	Leeds United	Watford
15:00 BST	Louza (yellow card) 57'; Sissoko (yellow card) 80'	Report	Raphinha 21'; Rodrigo 73'; Harrison 85'	Stadium: Vicarage Road; Attendance: 20,957; Referee: Andre Marriner

16 April 2022 32	Watford	1–2	Brentford	Watford
15:00 BST	Kamara (yellow card) 53'; Dennis 55'; Louza (yellow card) 87'	Report	Nørgaard 15'; Toney (yellow card) 62'; Jansson 90+5'	Stadium: Vicarage Road; Attendance: 20,747; Referee: Simon Hooper

23 April 2022 33	Manchester City	5–1	Watford	Manchester
15:00 BST	Gabriel Jesus 4', 23', 49', 53'; Rodri 34'; Cancelo (yellow card) 43'	Report	Kamara 28'	Stadium: City of Manchester Stadium; Attendance: 53,013; Referee: Kevin Friend

30 April 2022 34	Watford	1–2	Burnley	Watford
15:00 BST	Tarkowski 8' (o.g.); Kucka (yellow card) 87'	Report	Tarkowski (yellow card) 48'; Cork 83'; Brownhill 86'; Collins (yellow card) 90+1'	Stadium: Vicarage Road; Attendance: 20,738; Referee: Craig Pawson

7 May 2022 35	Crystal Palace	1–0	Watford	Selhurst
15:00 BST	Zaha 31' (pen.); Hughes (yellow card) 64'; Olise (yellow card) 90+4'	Report	Kamara (yellow card) 16' (yellow-red card) 69'; King (yellow card) 84'	Stadium: Selhurst Park; Attendance: 24,622; Referee: Graham Scott

11 May 2022 36	Watford	0–0	Everton	Watford
19:45 BST	Samir (yellow card) 61'	Report	Holgate (yellow card) 18'; Coleman (yellow card) 65'	Stadium: Vicarage Road; Attendance: 20,653; Referee: Mike Dean

15 May 2022 37	Watford	1–5	Leicester City	Watford
14:00 BST	João Pedro 6'	Report	Maddison 18'; Vardy 22', 70'; Barnes 46', 86'; Tielemans (yellow card) 55'	Stadium: Vicarage Road; Attendance: 20,257; Referee: Jarred Gillett

22 May 2022 38	Chelsea	2–1	Watford	Fulham
16:00 BST	Havertz 11'; Barkley 90+1'	Report	Gosling 87'	Stadium: Stamford Bridge; Attendance: 32,089; Referee: Mike Dean

=== FA Cup ===
Watford were drawn away to Leicester City in the third round.

8 January 2022 Third round	Leicester City	4–1	Watford	Leicester
15:00 GMT	Tielemans 7' (pen.); Maddison 25'; Daley-Campbell (yellow card) 36'; Barnes 54'; Albrighton 85'	Report	João Pedro 27'	Stadium: King Power Stadium; Attendance: 25,710; Referee: Mike Dean

=== EFL Cup ===
Watford entered the competition in the second round and were drawn at home to Crystal Palace and Stoke City in the third round.

24 August 2021 Second round	Watford	1–0	Crystal Palace	Watford
19:45 BST	Hernández (yellow card) 44'; Sierralta (yellow card) 61'; Fletcher 86'; Rose (yellow card) 90+4'	Report	Gallagher (yellow card) 54'	Stadium: Vicarage Road; Attendance: 9,011; Referee: Tim Robinson

21 September 2021 Third round	Watford	1–3	Stoke City	Watford
19:45 BST	Fletcher 61'	Report	Powell 25'; Clucas 80'; Tymon 85'; Batth (yellow card) 90+1'	Stadium: Vicarage Road; Attendance: 8,421; Referee: Tony Harrington

== Statistics ==
=== Appearances ===
Last updated: 22 May 2022.
Source: premierleague.com

No.	Pos.	Player	Premier League		FA Cup		EFL Cup		Total	
No.	Pos.	Player	Apps	Goals	Apps	Goals	Apps	Goals	Apps	Goals
Goalkeepers
1	GK	(England) Ben Foster	26	0	0	0	1	0	27	0
26	GK	(Austria) Daniel Bachmann	12	0	1	0	0	0	13	0
35	GK	(Republic of Ireland) Rob Elliot	0	0	0	0	1	0	1	0
Defenders
2	DF	(England) Jeremy Ngakia	9+7	0	1	0	2	0	12+7	0
3	DF	(England) Danny Rose	7+1	0	0	0	1	0	8+1	0
5	DF	(Nigeria) William Troost-Ekong	15+2	0	0	0	1	0	16+2	0
11	DF	(Morocco) Adam Masina	13+2	0	0	0	1	0	14+2	0
13	DF	(Cameroon) Nicolas Nkoulou	2+1	0	0	0	0	0	2+1	0
14	DF	(Ivory Coast) Hassane Kamara	18+1	1	0	0	0	0	18+1	1
15	DF	(Northern Ireland) Craig Cathcart	27+4	0	1	0	0	0	28+4	0
21	DF	(Spain) Kiko Femenía	26+1	0	0	0	0+1	0	26+2	0
22	DF	(Brazil) Samir	19	0	0	0	0	0	19	0
27	DF	(Belgium) Christian Kabasele	12+4	0	0	0	1	0	13+4	0
31	DF	(Chile) Francisco Sierralta	5	0	1	0	2	0	8	0
42	DF	(England) James Morris	0	0	1	0	0	0	1	0
Midfielders
4	MF	(Nigeria) Peter Etebo	4+5	0	0	0	1	0	5+5	0
6	MF	(Morocco) Imran Louza	17+3	0	0	0	2	0	19+3	0
8	MF	(England) Tom Cleverley	20+8	0	1	0	0+1	0	21+9	0
12	MF	(Sweden) Ken Sema	7+11	0	0+1	0	2	0	9+12	0
16	MF	(England) Dan Gosling	2+2	1	0+1	0	1	0	3+3	1
18	MF	(Turkey) Ozan Tufan	4+3	0	1	0	1	0	6+3	0
19	MF	(France) Moussa Sissoko	36	2	1	0	0+1	0	37+1	2
33	MF	(Slovakia) Juraj Kucka	22+4	1	0+1	0	0	0	22+5	1
39	MF	(Democratic Republic of the Congo) Edo Kayembe	9+4	0	0	0	0	0	9+4	0
45	MF	(England) Kamil Conteh	0	0	0+1	0	0	0	0+1	0
Forwards
7	FW	(Norway) Joshua King	27+5	5	0	0	1	0	28+5	5
10	FW	(Brazil) João Pedro	15+13	3	1	1	0	0	16+13	4
17	FW	(England) Ashley Fletcher	0+3	0	1	0	2	2	3+3	2
23	FW	(Senegal) Ismaïla Sarr	21+1	5	0	0	0	0	21+1	5
25	FW	(Nigeria) Emmanuel Dennis	30+3	10	0	0	0+2	0	30+5	10
28	FW	(Nigeria) Samuel Kalu	2+2	0	0	0	0	0	2+2	0
29	FW	(Colombia) Cucho Hernández	12+13	5	1	0	2	0	15+13	5
47	FW	(England) Shaq Forde	0	0	0+1	0	0	0	0+1	0

=== Goalscorers ===
The list is sorted by shirt number when total goals are equal.

Rank	Pos.	No.	Player	Premier League	FA Cup	EFL Cup	Total
1	FW	25	(Nigeria) Emmanuel Dennis	10	0	0	10
2	FW	7	(Norway) Joshua King	5	0	0	5
2	FW	23	(Senegal) Ismaïla Sarr	5	0	0	5
2	FW	29	(Colombia) Cucho Hernández	5	0	0	5
5	FW	10	(Brazil) João Pedro	3	1	0	4
6	FW	17	(England) Ashley Fletcher	0	0	2	2
6	MF	19	(France) Moussa Sissoko	2	0	0	2
8	DF	14	(Ivory Coast) Hassane Kamara	1	0	0	1
8	MF	16	(England) Dan Gosling	1	0	0	1
8	MF	33	(Slovakia) Juraj Kucka	1	0	0	1
8	Own goals			1	0	0	1
TOTALS				34	1	2	37

Last updated: 22 May 2022.
Source: premierleague.com

=== Clean sheets ===
The list is sorted by shirt number when total clean sheets are equal.

Rank	No.	Player	Premier League	FA Cup	EFL Cup	Total
1	1	(England) Ben Foster	4	0	1	5
TOTALS			4	0	1	5

== See also ==
- 2021–22 in English football
- List of Watford F.C. seasons
