= 2020–21 Watford F.C. season =

English football team season

Watford
2020–21 season
- Chairman: Scott Duxbury
- Head Coach: Vladimir Ivić (until 19 December); Xisco (from 20 December)
- Stadium: Vicarage Road
- Championship: 2nd (promoted)
- FA Cup: Third round
- EFL Cup: Third round
- Top goalscorer: League: Ismaïla Sarr (13); All: Ismaïla Sarr (13)
Home colours	Away colours	Third colours

The 2020–21 season was the 122nd season in existence of Watford Football Club and their first season back in the Championship following relegation from the Premier League in the previous season. Watford competed in the FA Cup and in the EFL Cup.

With their win over Millwall on 24 April 2021, Watford confirmed their promotion back to the Premier League at the first time of asking.

== Players ==
=== Current squad ===
As of 11 February 2021

Note: Flags indicate national team as defined under FIFA eligibility rules; some limited exceptions apply. Players may hold more than one non-FIFA nationality.

No.	Pos.	Nation	Player
1	GK	ENG	Ben Foster
3	DF	ENG	Jeremy Ngakia
5	DF	NGR	William Troost-Ekong
6	DF	ENG	Ben Wilmot
7	FW	DEN	Philip Zinckernagel
8	MF	ENG	Tom Cleverley (vice-captain)
9	FW	ENG	Troy Deeney (captain)
10	FW	BRA	João Pedro
11	DF	MAR	Adam Masina
12	MF	SWE	Ken Sema
14	MF	ENG	Nathaniel Chalobah (3rd captain)
15	DF	NIR	Craig Cathcart
16	MF	ENG	Dan Gosling
17	DF	MAR	Achraf Lazaar

No.	Pos.	Nation	Player
18	FW	JAM	Andre Gray
19	MF	ENG	Will Hughes (4th captain)
21	DF	ESP	Kiko Femenía
22	FW	NGR	Isaac Success
23	FW	SEN	Ismaïla Sarr
24	MF	NGR	Tom Dele-Bashiru
25	FW	CRO	Stipe Perica
26	GK	AUT	Daniel Bachmann
27	DF	BEL	Christian Kabasele
28	MF	COL	Carlos Sánchez
31	DF	CHI	Francisco Sierralta
32	DF	ESP	Marc Navarro
33	GK	IRL	Rob Elliot
35	GK	ENG	Adam Parkes

== Transfers ==
=== Transfers in ===
Date	Position	Nationality	Name	From	Fee	Ref.
14 August 2020	RB	(England)	Jeremy Ngakia	(England) West Ham United	Free transfer	
7 September 2020	CF	(Croatia)	Stipe Perica	(Italy) Udinese	Undisclosed	
9 September 2020	CB	(Chile)	Francisco Sierralta	(Italy) Udinese	Undisclosed	
15 September 2020	LB	(England)	Toby Stevenson	(England) Charlton Athletic	Free transfer	
24 September 2020	CB	(England)	Maxwell Statham	(England) Tottenham Hotspur	Free transfer	
29 September 2020	CB	(Nigeria)	William Troost-Ekong	(Italy) Udinese	Undisclosed	
1 December 2020	AM	(Scotland)	Phoenix Patterson	Unattached	Free transfer	
1 January 2021	FW	(Guinea)	Djibril Touré	(Guinea) Ceffomig FC	Undisclosed	
1 January 2021	RW	(Denmark)	Philip Zinckernagel	(Norway) FK Bodø/Glimt	Free transfer	
14 January 2021	CF	(Turkey)	Tiago Çukur	(Netherlands) AZ Alkmaar	Free transfer	
25 January 2021	CM	(Kenya)	Henry Ochieng	(Republic of Ireland) Cork City	Undisclosed	
28 January 2021	GK	(Republic of Ireland)	Rob Elliot	(England) Newcastle United	Free transfer	
31 January 2021	CM	(England)	Dan Gosling	(England) Bournemouth	Undisclosed	
31 January 2021	RW	(Spain)	Maurizio Pochettino	(England) Tottenham Hotspur	Free transfer	
1 February 2021	AM	(Netherlands)	Mitchel Bergkamp	(Netherlands) Almere City	Free transfer	
11 February 2021	LB	(Morocco)	Achraf Lazaar	(England) Newcastle United	Free transfer	
4 March 2021	DM	(Colombia)	Carlos Sánchez	(England) West Ham United	Free transfer	

=== Loans in ===
Date from	Position	Nationality	Name	From	Date until	Ref.
1 September 2020	CF	(England)	Glenn Murray	(England) Brighton & Hove Albion	30 January 2021	
18 September 2020	DM	(England)	James Garner	(England) Manchester United	30 January 2021	

=== Loans out ===
Date from	Position	Nationality	Name	To	Date until	Ref.
23 July 2020	CM	(Colombia)	Jaime Alvarado	(Brazil) Athletico Paranaense	End of season	
4 August 2020	CM	(Brazil)	Matheus Santana	(Spain) Recreativo Huelva	End of season	
7 August 2020	LW	(Republic of Ireland)	Ryan Cassidy	(England) Accrington Stanley	End of season	
9 August 2020	AM	(Colombia)	Juergen Elitim	(Spain) Ponferradina	End of season	
11 August 2020	GK	(Sweden)	Pontus Dahlberg	(Sweden) BK Häcken	End of season	
12 August 2020	CM	(Ghana)	Kwasi Sibo	(Spain) UD Ibiza	End of season	
14 August 2020	CF	(Colombia)	Cucho Hernández	(Spain) Getafe	End of season	
20 August 2020	RB	(Ghana)	Kingsley Fobi	(Spain) Recreativo Granada	End of 2021–22 season	
2 September 2020	CB	(Colombia)	Jorge Segura	(Colombia) Atlético Nacional	31 December 2020	
18 September 2020	MF	(England)	Harry Forster	(England) Bromley	End of season	
18 September 2020	GK	(England)	Myles Roberts	(England) Wingate & Finchley	14 October 2020	
5 October 2020	CB	(Netherlands)	Derek Agyakwa	(Italy) Como 1907	End of season	
5 October 2020	LW	(Spain)	Gerard Deulofeu	(Italy) Udinese	30 January 2021	
5 October 2020	RW	(Argentina)	Ignacio Pussetto	(Italy) Udinese	End of season	
5 October 2020	FW	(Venezuela)	Adalberto Peñaranda	(Bulgaria) CSKA Sofia	End of season	
5 October 2020	FW	(England)	Jerome Sinclair	(Bulgaria) CSKA Sofia	End of season	
12 October 2020	CB	(England)	Craig Dawson	(England) West Ham United	End of season	
16 October 2020	CB	(Guyana)	Bayli Spencer-Adams	(England) Dover Athletic	31 January 2021	
12 November 2020	LW	(England)	Joseph Hungbo	(England) Aldershot Town	8 January 2021	
1 February 2021	CM	(Portugal)	Domingos Quina	(Spain) Granada	End of season	
1 February 2021	FW	(Guinea)	Djibril Touré	(Belgium) R. Charleroi S.C.	End of season	
1 February 2021	CB	(England)	George Langston	(England) Wealdstone	Short-term	
19 February 2021	CF	(England)	Sam Dalby	(England) Stockport County	March 2021	
16 April 2021	RW	(Scotland)	Sonny Blu Lo-Everton	(England) Wealdstone	End of season	

=== Transfers out ===
Date	Position	Nationality	Name	To	Fee	Ref.
1 July 2020	CM	(England)	Emmanuel Adebiyi	Unattached	Released	
1 July 2020	RB	(England)	Jamal Balogun	Unattached	Released	
1 July 2020	LW	(England)	Jayden Bennetts	(Germany) Paderborn 07	Released	
1 July 2020	CF	(England)	Michael Folivi	(England) Colchester United	Released	
1 July 2020	LB	(Scotland)	Lewis Gordon	(England) Brentford	Released	
1 July 2020	LB	(England)	Cameron Green	Unattached	Released	
1 July 2020	SS	(England)	Kaylen Hinds	(England) Aldershot Town	Released	
1 July 2020	GK	(England)	James Hoskins	Unattached	Released	
1 July 2020	CB	(England)	Harry Hudson	Unattached	Released	
1 July 2020	CM	(England)	Ryan Maclean	Unattached	Released	
1 July 2020	CB	(England)	James Matthews	Unattached	Released	
1 July 2020	DM	(England)	Imaad Sankoh	Unattached	Released	
24 July 2020	RB	(Guadeloupe)	Dimitri Foulquier	(Spain) Granada	Undisclosed	
1 August 2020	GK	(Brazil)	Heurelho Gomes	Retired	N/A	
1 August 2020	LB	(Greece)	José Holebas	(Greece) Olympiacos	Released	
1 August 2020	CB	(Jamaica)	Adrian Mariappa	(England) Bristol City	Released	
1 August 2020	DM	(England)	Callum Whelan	(England) Oldham Athletic	Released	
5 August 2020	CF	(Scotland)	Alex Jakubiak	(Scotland) Dundee	Free transfer	
21 August 2020	CF	(Brazil)	Matheus Aiás	(United States) Orlando City	Undisclosed	
26 August 2020	CF	(Colombia)	Juan Camilo Becerra	(Spain) Espanyol	Undisclosed	
8 September 2020	CM	(Mali)	Abdoulaye Doucouré	(England) Everton	£20,000,000	
18 September 2020	GK	(England)	Harvey White	(England) Woking	Free transfer	
16 September 2020	LB	(Ecuador)	Pervis Estupiñán	(Spain) Villarreal	£15,000,000	
28 September 2020	AM	(Argentina)	Roberto Pereyra	(Italy) Udinese	Undisclosed	
2 October 2020	CF	(Colombia)	Luis Suárez	(Spain) Granada	£10,000,000	
6 October 2020	CF	(England)	Danny Welbeck	(England) Brighton & Hove Albion	Released	
29 December 2020	RB	(Netherlands)	Daryl Janmaat	(Netherlands) ADO Den Haag	Undisclosed	
30 December 2020	DM	(France)	Étienne Capoue	(Spain) Villarreal	Undisclosed	
30 January 2021	LW	(Spain)	Gerard Deulofeu	(Italy) Udinese	Undisclosed	

== Pre-season and friendlies ==
Win Draw Loss Fixtures

18 August 2020 Friendly	Watford XI	1–3	Gillingham	St Albans, England
14:00 BST (UTC+1)	14'	Report	Graham 2'; Willock 34'; Akinde 44'	Stadium: Watford F.C. Training Ground; Attendance: 0

29 August 2020 Friendly	Watford	1–0	Scunthorpe United	Watford, England
15:00 BST (UTC+1)	Ngakia 29'	Report		Stadium: Vicarage Road; Attendance: 0

5 September 2020 Friendly	Watford	2–1	Tottenham Hotspur	Watford, England
15:00 BST (UTC+1)	Quina 20'; Chalobah (yellow card) 30'; Gray 39' (pen.); Phillips (yellow card) 69'; João Pedro (yellow card) 76'; Peñaranda (yellow card) 81'	Report	Alli (yellow card) 72'; Son 79' (pen.)	Stadium: Vicarage Road; Attendance: 0 Referee: Jarred Gillett

== Competitions ==
=== Overview ===
Competition	First match	Last match	Starting round	Final position	Record							
Competition	First match	Last match	Starting round	Final position	Pld	W	D	L	GF	GA	GD	Win %
Championship	11 September 2020	8 May 2021	Matchday 1	2nd	46	27	10	9	63	30	+33	58.70
FA Cup	9 January 2021		Third round	Third round	1	0	0	1	0	1	−1	0.00
EFL Cup	14 September 2020	22 September 2020	Second round	Third round	2	0	1	1	2	4	−2	0.00
Total					49	27	11	11	65	35	+30	55.10

Source: Soccerway

=== Championship ===
==== League table ====
Pos	Team	Pld	W	D	L	GF	GA	GD	Pts	Promotion, qualification or relegation
1	Norwich City (C, P)	46	29	10	7	75	36	+39	97	Promotion to the Premier League
2	Watford (P)	46	27	10	9	63	30	+33	91	Promotion to the Premier League
3	Brentford (O, P)	46	24	15	7	79	42	+37	87	Qualification for Championship play-offs
4	Swansea City	46	23	11	12	56	39	+17	80	Qualification for Championship play-offs
5	Barnsley	46	23	9	14	58	50	+8	78	Qualification for Championship play-offs
6	Bournemouth	46	22	11	13	73	46	+27	77	Qualification for Championship play-offs

Source: EFL Official Website
Rules for classification: 1) Points; 2) Goal difference; 3) Number of goals scored; 4) Head-to-head results; 5) Wins; 6) Away goals; 7) Penalty points (sec 9.5); 8) 12-point sending off offences
(C) Champions; (O) Play-off winners; (P) Promoted

==== Results summary ====
Overall								Home						Away					
Pld	W	D	L	GF	GA	GD	Pts	W	D	L	GF	GA	GD	W	D	L	GF	GA	GD
46	27	10	9	63	30	+33	91	19	2	2	43	12	+31	8	8	7	20	18	+2

Last updated: 8 May 2021.

==== Results by matchday ====
Matchday	1	2	3	4	5	6	7	8	9	10	11	12	13	14	15	16	17	18	19	20	21	22	23	24	25	26	27	28	29	30	31	32	33	34	35	36	37	38	39	40	41	42	43	44	45	46
Ground	H	A	H	A	A	H	H	A	A	H	H	A	A	H	A	H	H	A	H	A	H	A	A	H	A	A	H	A	H	A	H	A	A	H	H	A	A	H	H	A	H	A	A	H	A	H
Result	W	D	W	L	W	W	D	D	L	W	W	D	D	W	D	L	W	W	D	L	W	L	W	W	W	D	L	D	W	W	W	W	L	W	W	W	W	W	W	D	W	L	W	W	L	W
Position	10	8	5	7	5	3	3	5	6	4	2	5	5	3	3	7	3	4	3	5	5	6	5	3	3	2	5	5	4	4	3	4	3	3	2	2	2	2	2	2	2	2	2	2	2	2

Updated to match(es) played on 8 May 2021. Source:
A = Away; H = Home; W = Win; D = Draw; L = Loss

==== Matches ====
The 2020–21 season fixtures were released on 21 August.

11 September 2020 1	Watford	1–0	Middlesbrough	Watford
19:45 BST	Cathcart 11'; Wilmot (yellow card) 85'	Report		Stadium: Vicarage Road; Attendance: 0 Referee: Keith Stroud

19 September 2020 2	Sheffield Wednesday	0–0	Watford	Owlerton, Sheffield
15:00 BST	Luongo (yellow card) 65'; Bannan (yellow card) 68'	Report	Chalobah (yellow card) 81'; Garner (yellow card) 88'	Stadium: Hillsborough; Referee: Jarred Gillett

26 September 2020 3	Watford	1–0	Luton Town	Watford
15:00 BST	João Pedro 35'	Report	Pearson (yellow card) 75'	Stadium: Vicarage Road; Referee: John Brooks

3 October 2020 4	Reading	1–0	Watford	Reading
15:00 BST	Laurent (yellow card) 39'; Pușcaș 41'; Richards (yellow card) 62'; Tetek (yellow card) 87'	Report	Wilmot (yellow card) 40'; Pedro (yellow card) 87'; Chalobah (yellow card) 90+3'	Stadium: Madejski Stadium; Attendance: 0 Referee: Grant Ward

16 October 2020 5	Derby County	0–1	Watford	Derby
19:45 BST		Report	João Pedro 76'	Stadium: Pride Park; Referee: Geoff Eltringham

21 October 2020 6	Watford	3–1	Blackburn Rovers	Watford
19:45 BST	Pedro 13' (yellow card) 84'; Cleverley 17'; Kabasele (yellow card) 22'; Lenihan 49' (o.g.); Ngakia (yellow card) 75'	Report	Brereton 28'; Armstrong (penalty missed) 69'	Stadium: Vicarage Road; Attendance: 0 Referee: Andy Woolmer

24 October 2020 7	Watford	1–1	Bournemouth	Watford
12:30 BST	Perica 12'; Garner (yellow card) 25'; Cleverley (yellow card) 57'; Chalobah (yellow card) 90+7'	Report	Kelly (yellow card) 2'; Rico (yellow card) 64'; Mepham 90+6'	Stadium: Vicarage Road; Attendance: 0 Referee: Tim Robinson

27 October 2020 8	Wycombe Wanderers	1–1	Watford	High Wycombe
19:45 GMT	Stewart 66'	Report	Sarr 52'; Kiko (yellow card) 80'	Stadium: Adams Park; Attendance: 0 Referee: John Brooks

31 October 2020 9	Barnsley	1–0	Watford	Barnsley
15:00 GMT	Mowatt 6'; Styles (yellow card) 82'	Report	Troost-Ekong (yellow card) 3'	Stadium: Oakwell; Attendance: 0 Referee: Matt Donohue

4 November 2020 10	Watford	3–2	Stoke City	Watford
19:00 GMT	Cleverley 28'; Chalobah (yellow card) 56'; Pedro 61' (pen.); Sarr 90+2'; Capoue (yellow card) 90+3'	Report	Fletcher 2'; Gunn (yellow card) 61'; Mikel (yellow card) 79'; Powell 81'	Stadium: Vicarage Road; Attendance: 0 Referee: Andy Davies

7 November 2020 11	Watford	3–2	Coventry City	Watford
15:00 GMT	Gray 54'; Kiko (yellow card) 62'; Troost-Ekong 66'; Sarr 83' (pen.)	Report	Østigård (yellow card) 55'; Hamer 63'; Walker 64'; O'Hare (yellow card) 83'	Stadium: Vicarage Road; Attendance: 0 Referee: Simon Hooper

21 November 2020 12	Queens Park Rangers	1–1	Watford	Shepherd's Bush
15:00 GMT	Chair 77'; Dykes (yellow card) 90+1'	Report	Wilmot 3'; Sema (yellow card) 59'; Cathcart (yellow card) 85'	Stadium: Kiyan Prince Foundation Stadium; Attendance: 0 Referee: Michael Salisbury

25 November 2020 13	Bristol City	0–0	Watford	Ashton Gate
19:45 GMT		Report		Stadium: Ashton Gate Stadium; Attendance: 0 Referee: Dean Whitestone

28 November 2020 14	Watford	4–1	Preston North End	Watford
15:00 GMT	Quina 9'; Garner (yellow card) 23'; Deeney 52' (pen.); Chalobah 58'; Pedro 74'	Report	Barkhuizen 55'	Stadium: Vicarage Road; Attendance: 0 Referee: Jarred Gillett

2 December 2020 15	Nottingham Forest	0–0	Watford	West Bridgford
19:45 GMT	Lolley (yellow card) 23'; Knockaert (yellow card) 54'; Arter (yellow card) 84'	Report	Chalobah (yellow card) 69'; Quina (yellow card) 71'	Stadium: The City Ground; Attendance: 0 Referee: David Webb

5 December 2020 16	Watford	0–1	Cardiff City	Watford
15:00 GMT	Perica (yellow card) 89'	Report	Moore 43'; Ojo (yellow card) 60'; Ralls (yellow card) 66'	Stadium: Vicarage Road; Attendance: 1,973; Referee: Stephen Martin

8 December 2020 17	Watford	2–0	Rotherham United	Watford
19:45 GMT	Kabasele 4'; Deeney 15'	Report	Jones (yellow card) 67'; Ihiekwe (yellow card) 71'	Stadium: Vicarage Road; Attendance: 1,976; Referee: Josh Smith

12 December 2020 18	Birmingham City	0–1	Watford	Bordesley
15:00 GMT	Kieftenbeld (yellow card) 15'; Pedersen (yellow card) 57' (yellow-red card) 84'	Report	Deeney 85' (pen.); Capoue (yellow card) 90+1'	Stadium: St Andrew's Stadium; Attendance: 0 Referee: Matt Donohue

15 December 2020 19	Watford	1–1	Brentford	Watford
20:00 GMT	Deeney 60' (pen.) (yellow card) 87'; Kabasele (yellow card) 76'; Troost-Ekong (yellow card) 90+1'; Sarr (yellow card) 90+3'	Report	Pinnock (red card) 58'; Toney 63' (pen.)	Stadium: Vicarage Road; Attendance: 0 Referee: James Linington

19 December 2020 20	Huddersfield Town	2–0	Watford	Huddersfield
15:00 GMT	Campbell 9'; Schofield (yellow card) 21'; Capoue 32' (o.g.); Bacuna (yellow card) 86'	Report	Wilmot (yellow card) 34'	Stadium: The John Smith's Stadium; Attendance: 0 Referee: Leigh Doughty

26 December 2020 21	Watford	1–0	Norwich City	Watford
19:45 GMT	Capoue (yellow card) 18'; Sarr 39' (yellow card) 78'; Cleverley (yellow card) 63'; Hughes (yellow card) 87'	Report		Stadium: Vicarage Road; Attendance: 0 Referee: John Brooks

2 January 2021 22	Swansea City	2–1	Watford	Swansea
15:00 GMT	Guehi (yellow card) 21'; Bidwell (yellow card) 33'; Lowe 43', 67'; Grimes (yellow card) 45+2'	Report	Cleverley 20'; Chalobah (yellow card) 42'; Masina (yellow card) 90'	Stadium: The Liberty Stadium; Attendance: 0 Referee: Darren Bond

16 January 2021 23	Watford	2–0	Huddersfield Town	Watford
15:00 GMT	Deeney (yellow card) 30'; Cleverley 54'; Sierralta (yellow card) 56'; Chalobah (yellow card) 59'; João Pedro 64'	Report	Campbell (yellow card) 40'; Crichlow (yellow card) 66'	Stadium: Vicarage Road; Attendance: 0 Referee: Michael Salisbury

19 January 2021 24	Watford	1–0	Barnsley	Watford
19:45 GMT	Deeney 27' (pen.); Sarr (yellow card) 90+3'	Report	Sollbauer (yellow card) 90'	Stadium: Vicarage Road; Attendance: 0 Referee: Tim Robinson

22 January 2021 25	Stoke City	1–2	Watford	Stoke-on-Trent
19:45 GMT	Collins (yellow card) 81'; Fletcher 83'	Report	Sierralta (yellow card) 18'; Femenía (yellow card) 34'; Deeney 64' (pen.); Sarr 68'	Stadium: bet365 Stadium; Attendance: 0 Referee: Oliver Langford

26 January 2021 26	Millwall	0–0	Watford	Bermondsey
19:00 GMT	Kieftenbeld (yellow card) 26'; Cooper (yellow card) 33'	Report	Masina (yellow card) 45+2'; Cleverley (yellow card) 45+3'; Chalobah (yellow card) 56'; Sierralta (yellow card) 74'	Stadium: The Den; Attendance: 0 Referee: Jeremy Simpson

1 February 2021 27	Watford	1–2	Queens Park Rangers	Watford
19:45 GMT	Deeney 52' (pen.); Sierralta (yellow card) 54'; Navarro (yellow card) 90+3'	Report	Wallace (yellow card) 33'; Austin 73'; Adomah 90'	Stadium: Vicarage Road; Attendance: 0 Referee: Jarred Gillett

6 February 2021 28	Coventry City	0–0	Watford	Bordesley
12:30 GMT		Report	Sierralta (yellow card) 24'; Gray (yellow card) 29'	Stadium: St Andrew's Stadium; Attendance: 0 Referee: Graham Scott

13 February 2021 29	Watford	6–0	Bristol City	Watford
15:00 GMT	Sema 2', 35'; Sarr 15', 55'; Chalobah (yellow card) 17'; Hughes 30'; João Pedro (yellow card) 81'; Zinckernagel 90'	Report	Moore (yellow card) 7'; Diédhiou (yellow card) 47'; Palmer (yellow card) 81'	Stadium: Vicarage Road; Attendance: 0 Referee: John Brooks

16 February 2021 30	Preston North End	0–1	Watford	Preston
19:00 GMT		Report	João Pedro 51' (pen.); Cleverley (yellow card) 63'	Stadium: Deepdale; Attendance: 0 Referee: Tony Harrington

19 February 2021 31	Watford	2–1	Derby County	Watford
19:45 GMT	João Pedro 19'; Hughes (yellow card) 20', (goal) 21'; Cleverley (yellow card) 42'	Report	Buchanan (yellow card) 45'; Troost-Ekong 77' (o.g.); Byrne (yellow card) 90+1'	Stadium: Vicarage Road; Attendance: 0 Referee: Tim Robinson

24 February 2021 32	Blackburn Rovers	2–3	Watford	Blackburn
19:45 GMT	Rothwell (yellow card) 34'; Elliott 43'; Brereton 82'	Report	Pedro 25'; Sarr 38'; Sema 61'	Stadium: Ewood Park; Attendance: 0 Referee: James Linington

27 February 2021 33	Bournemouth	1–0	Watford	King's Park, Boscombe
12:30 GMT	Cook (yellow card) 47'; Danjuma 61'; Wilshere (yellow card) 90+7' (yellow-red card) 90+9'; Begović (yellow card) 90+7'	Report	Masina (yellow card) 34'; Hughes (yellow card) 49'; Chalobah (yellow card) 60'; Pedro (yellow card) 90+5' (yellow-red card) 90+7'; Sarr (yellow card) 90+8'	Stadium: Vitality Stadium; Attendance: 0 Referee: Tony Harrington

3 March 2021 34	Watford	2–0	Wycombe Wanderers	Watford
19:00 GMT	Gray 14', 57'	Report		Stadium: Vicarage Road; Attendance: 0 Referee: Geoff Eltringham

6 March 2021 35	Watford	1–0	Nottingham Forest	Watford
12:30 GMT	Masina 17'; Pedro (yellow card) 45+1'; Zinckernagel (yellow card) 50'	Report	Knockaert (yellow card) 10'	Stadium: Vicarage Road; Attendance: 0 Referee: Jonathan Moss

13 March 2021 36	Cardiff City	1–2	Watford	Cardiff
15:00 GMT	Sierralta 14' (o.g.); Bacuna (yellow card) 81'; Ng (yellow card) 90+2'	Report	Chalobah 15'; Bachmann (yellow card) 39'; Hughes (yellow card) 45+1'; Sarr (yellow card) 82'; Sierralta (yellow card) 85'; Masina 90+3'	Stadium: Cardiff City Stadium; Referee: Keith Stroud

16 March 2021 37	Rotherham United	1–4	Watford	Rotherham
19:00 GMT	Smith (penalty missed) 61'; Ladapo 68'	Report	Sierralta 9'; Sarr 26'; Sema 39'; Gosling 69'	Stadium: New York Stadium; Attendance: 0 Referee: Jeremy Simpson

20 March 2021 38	Watford	3–0	Birmingham City	Watford
15:00 GMT	Sema 4'; Success (yellow card) 44'; Chalobah 55'; Gray 80'	Report	Pedersen (yellow card) 35'	Stadium: Vicarage Road; Attendance: 0 Referee: Darren Bond

2 April 2021 39	Watford	1–0	Sheffield Wednesday	Watford
15:00 BST	Lees 7' (o.g.); Sierralta (yellow card) 30'; Hughes (yellow card) 64'	Report	Börner (yellow card) 3'; Urhoghide (yellow card) 38'; Reach (yellow card) 41'; Wildsmith (yellow card) 78'	Stadium: Vicarage Road; Attendance: 0 Referee: Chris Kavanagh

5 April 2021 40	Middlesbrough	1–1	Watford	Middlesbrough
12:30 BST	Bolasie 78'	Report	Chalobah (yellow card) 25'; Sarr 32'	Stadium: Riverside Stadium; Attendance: 0 Referee: Tim Robinson

9 April 2021 41	Watford	2–0	Reading	Watford
19:45 BST	Sarr 12', 14'; Zinckernagel (yellow card) 17'; Hughes (yellow card) 75'; Success (yellow card) 90+3'	Report	Rinomhota (yellow card) 56'	Stadium: Vicarage Road; Attendance: 0 Referee: James Linington

17 April 2021 42	Luton Town	1–0	Watford	Luton
12:30 BST	Bradley (yellow card) 28'; Collins 78' (pen.); Berry (yellow card) 80'	Report	Femenía (yellow card) 72' (yellow-red card) 88'; Bachmann (yellow card) 75'; Sierralta (yellow card) 76'	Stadium: Kenilworth Road; Attendance: 0 Referee: Gavin Ward

20 April 2021 43	Norwich City	0–1	Watford	Norwich
18:00 BST	Skipp (yellow card) 62'; McLean (yellow card) 73'; Hugill (yellow card) 90+6'	Report	Hughes (yellow card) 27'; Masina (yellow card) 49'; Gosling 57'; Cleverley (yellow card) 65'; Chalobah (yellow card) 90+8'	Stadium: Carrow Road; Attendance: 0 Referee: Tim Robinson

24 April 2021 44	Watford	1–0	Millwall	Watford
15:00 BST	Sarr 11' (pen.)	Report	Muller (yellow card) 86'	Stadium: Vicarage Road; Attendance: 0 Referee: Dean Whitestone

1 May 2021 45	Brentford	2–0	Watford	Brentford
15:00 BST	Forss 46'; Toney 60'; Bidstrup (yellow card) 66'; Canós (yellow card) 69'	Report	Perica (yellow card) 88'	Stadium: Brentford Community Stadium; Attendance: 0 Referee: Lee Mason

8 May 2021 46	Watford	2–0	Swansea City	Watford
12:30 BST	Gray 56'; Success 87'	Report		Stadium: Vicarage Road; Attendance: 0 Referee: Geoff Eltringham

=== FA Cup ===
The third round draw was made on 30 November, with Premier League and EFL Championship clubs all entering the competition.

9 January 2021 Third round	Manchester United	1–0	Watford	Trafford
20:00 GMT	McTominay 5'; Tuanzebe (yellow card) 65'; Telles (yellow card) 72'	Report	Sarr (yellow card) 38'	Stadium: Old Trafford; Attendance: 0 Referee: Andrew Madley

=== EFL Cup ===
The draw for both the second and third round were confirmed on September 6, live on Sky Sports by Phil Babb.

15 September 2020 Second round	Oxford United	1–1 (0–3 p)	Watford	Oxford
19:00 BST	Hall 26'	Report	Navarro (yellow card) 72'; Sema 89'	Stadium: Kassam Stadium; Attendance: 0 Referee: Leigh Doughty
	Penalties
	Forde (penalty missed); McGuane (penalty missed); Hall (penalty missed)		(penalty scored) Sema; (penalty scored) Quina; (penalty scored) Perica

22 September 2020 Third round	Newport County	3–1	Watford	Newport
19:00 BST	Abrahams 18' (pen.); Labadie 28' (yellow card) 42'; Amond 65'; Bennett (yellow card) 80'	Report	Stevenson (yellow card) 17'; Agyakwa (yellow card) 40'; Peñaranda 54' (pen.) (yellow card) 62'; Pussetto (yellow card) 76'; Perica (red card) 88'	Stadium: Rodney Parade; Attendance: 0 Referee: Charles Breakspear

== Appearances and goals ==
No.	Pos	Nat	Player	Total		Championship		FA Cup		League Cup	
No.	Pos	Nat	Player	Apps	Goals	Apps	Goals	Apps	Goals	Apps	Goals
Goalkeepers
1	GK	(England) ENG	Ben Foster	23	0	23	0	0	0	0	0
26	GK	(Austria) AUT	Daniel Bachmann	26	0	23	0	1	0	2	0
30	GK	(Sweden) SWE	Pontus Dahlberg	0	0	0	0	0	0	0	0
33	GK	(Republic of Ireland) IRL	Rob Elliot	0	0	0	0	0	0	0	0
35	GK	(England) ENG	Adam Parkes	0	0	0	0	0	0	0	0
Defenders
3	DF	(England) ENG	Jeremy Ngakia	26	0	18+7	0	0+1	0	0	0
5	DF	(Nigeria) NGR	William Troost-Ekong	33	1	31+1	1	1	0	0	0
6	DF	(England) ENG	Ben Wilmot	27	1	14+11	1	0+1	0	1	0
11	DF	(Morocco) MAR	Adam Masina	26	2	21+4	2	1	0	0	0
15	DF	(Northern Ireland) NIR	Craig Cathcart	25	1	20+5	1	0	0	0	0
17	DF	(Morocco) MAR	Achraf Lazaar	5	0	2+3	0	0	0	0	0
21	DF	(Spain) ESP	Kiko Femenía	37	0	36+1	0	0	0	0	0
27	DF	(Belgium) BEL	Christian Kabasele	21	1	19+1	1	0	0	0+1	0
31	DF	(Chile) CHI	Francisco Sierralta	29	1	24+2	1	1	0	2	0
32	DF	(Spain) ESP	Marc Navarro	8	0	2+4	0	1	0	1	0
47	DF	(England) ENG	Toby Stevenson	2	0	0	0	0	0	2	0
Midfielders
8	MF	(England) ENG	Tom Cleverley	34	4	32+2	4	0	0	0	0
12	MF	(Sweden) SWE	Ken Sema	43	6	38+3	5	0+1	0	0+1	1
14	MF	(England) ENG	Nathaniel Chalobah	40	3	32+6	3	1	0	1	0
16	MF	(England) ENG	Dan Gosling	14	2	6+7	2	0	0	1	0
19	MF	(England) ENG	Will Hughes	31	2	21+9	2	1	0	0	0
24	MF	(Nigeria) NGR	Tom Dele-Bashiru	2	0	1+1	0	0	0	0	0
28	MF	(Colombia) COL	Carlos Sánchez	9	0	2+7	0	0	0	0	0
38	MF	(Spain) ESP	Maurizio Pochettino	1	0	0+1	0	0	0	0	0
44	MF	(England) ENG	Joseph Hungbo	6	0	1+4	0	0	0	1	0
49	MF	(Bermuda) BER	Kane Crichlow	1	0	0	0	0	0	0+1	0
52	MF	(Trinidad and Tobago) TTO	Daniel Phillips	5	0	0+2	0	0+1	0	2	0
Forwards
7	FW	(Denmark) DEN	Philip Zinckernagel	21	1	9+11	1	1	0	0	0
9	FW	(England) ENG	Troy Deeney	19	7	14+5	7	0	0	0	0
10	FW	(Brazil) BRA	João Pedro	40	9	31+7	9	1	0	0+1	0
18	FW	(Jamaica) JAM	Andre Gray	31	5	14+16	5	1	0	0	0
22	FW	(Nigeria) NGR	Isaac Success	10	1	3+7	1	0	0	0	0
23	FW	(Senegal) SEN	Ismaïla Sarr	40	13	39	13	1	0	0	0
25	FW	(Croatia) CRO	Stipe Perica	18	1	2+14	1	0	0	1+1	0
Players transferred out during the season
4	DF	(England) ENG	Craig Dawson	1	0	0	0	0	0	1	0
45	DF	(Netherlands) NED	Derek Agyakwa	2	0	0	0	0	0	2	0
20	MF	(Portugal) POR	Domingos Quina	15	1	8+6	1	0	0	1	0
33	MF	(Argentina) ARG	Ignacio Pussetto	2	0	0+1	0	0	0	1	0
13	FW	(Venezuela) VEN	Adalberto Peñaranda	1	1	0	0	0	0	0+1	1
17	FW	(England) ENG	Glenn Murray	6	0	1+4	0	0	0	1	0
34	FW	(England) ENG	Jerome Sinclair	2	0	0	0	0	0	2	0

Last updated: 8 May 2021
Source: Competitions
