= Ismaïla Sarr =

Senegalese footballer (born 1998)

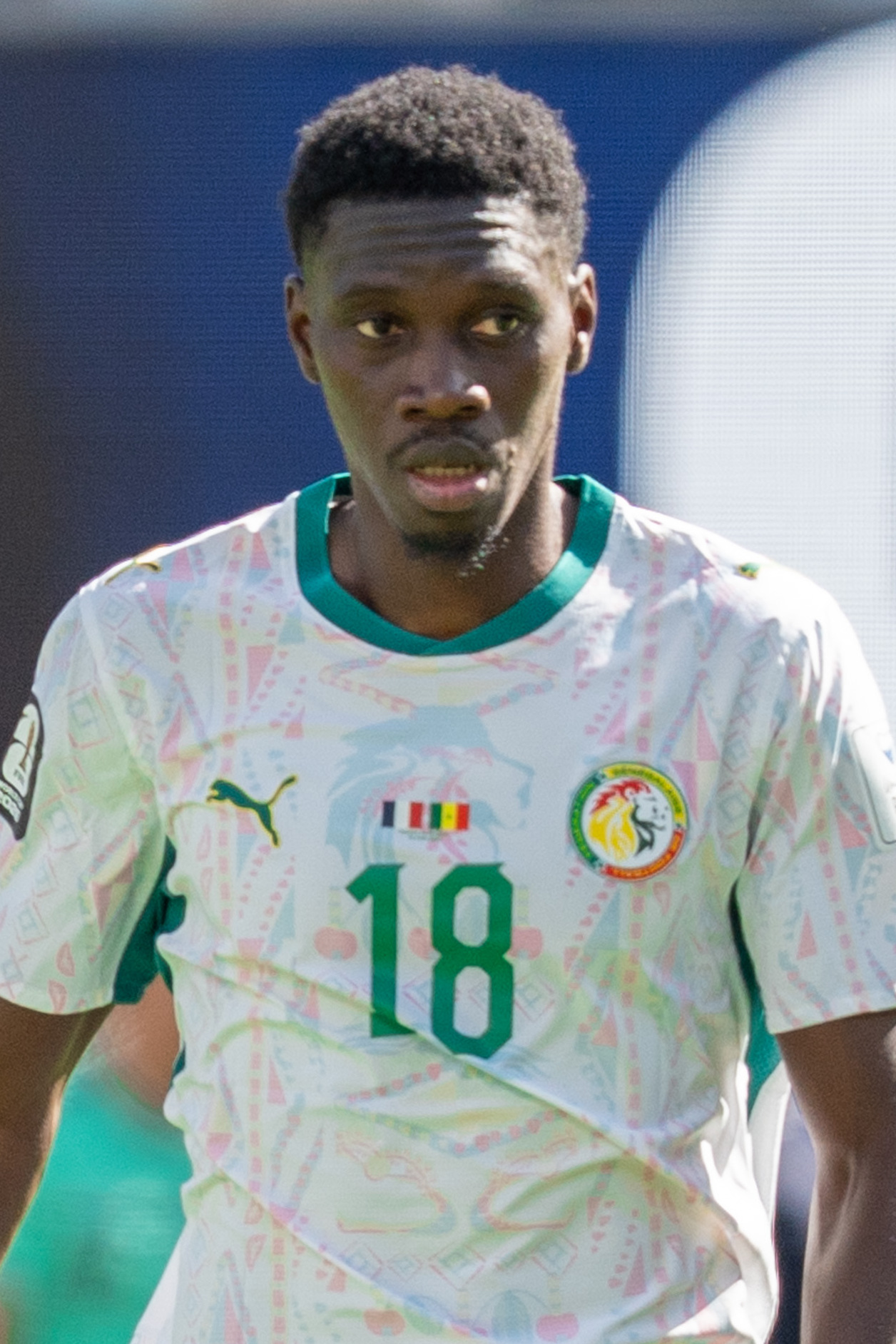
- Sarr with Senegal in 2026

Personal information
- Full name: Ismaïla Sarr
- Date of birth: 25 February 1998 (age 28)
- Place of birth: Saint-Louis, Senegal
- Height: 1.85 m (6 ft 1 in)
- Positions: Winger; forward

Team information
- Current team: Crystal Palace
- Number: 7

Youth career
- 2009–2016: Génération Foot

Senior career*
| Years | Team | Apps | (Gls) |
| 2016–2017 | Metz | 31 | (5) |
| 2017–2019 | Rennes | 59 | (13) |
| 2019–2023 | Watford | 128 | (33) |
| 2023–2024 | Marseille | 23 | (3) |
| 2024– | Crystal Palace | 68 | (17) |

International career^{‡}
| 2015 | Senegal U23 | 3 | (0) |
| 2016– | Senegal | 88 | (23) |
Medal record
Men's football
Representing Senegal
Africa Cup of Nations
| Winner | 2021 Cameroon |
| Runner-up | 2019 Egypt |
| Runner-up | 2025 Morocco |
- * Club domestic league appearances and goals as of 11 October 2026 ‡ National team caps and goals as of 1 July 2026

Ismaïla Sarr (born 25 February 1998) is a Senegalese professional footballer who plays as a winger or forward for Premier League club Crystal Palace and the Senegal national team.

Sarr was a youth academy graduate of Senegalese club Génération Foot, and made his senior debut for Ligue 1 club Metz in 2016. He subsequently spent two seasons at Rennes, winning the Coupe de France in 2019 and scoring the winning penalty in the final, before moving to Premier League club Watford, where he was named Player of the Season in 2021. He departed in 2023 and spent a season back in France with Marseille, before returning to England with Crystal Palace, where he won the FA Cup in 2025, his first season. In 2026, he was top goalscorer and named best player as Palace won the UEFA Conference League.

Sarr made his senior debut for Senegal in 2016, and went on to represent his side at the FIFA World Cup in 2018, 2022 and 2026, as well as at the Africa Cup of Nations in 2019, 2021, 2023 and 2025, winning the 2021 tournament.

== Club career ==
=== Early career ===
Born in Saint-Louis, Senegal, Sarr started his football career with Senegalese football club Génération Foot.

=== Metz ===
On 13 July 2016, Sarr signed his first professional contract with Metz for five years. He made his league debut as a substitute in a 3–2 win against Lille on 13 August, in Metz's first match of the 2016–17 Ligue 1 season. He made his first professional start in a 3–0 win at Nantes on 11 September.

On 8 February 2017, Sarr scored his first Ligue 1 goal in a 2–1 win against Dijon. He went on to score four more goals in his final eight appearances of the season, ending 2016–17 with five goals and five assists from 31 league appearances.

=== Rennes ===
On 26 July 2017, Sarr signed a four-year contract with Ligue 1 side Rennes. The transfer fee paid to Metz was reported as €17 or 20 million, depending on the source. Sarr claimed that he had chosen to sign for Rennes ahead of Barcelona, saying: "I could have gone to Spain and join the great Barcelona, but leaving Metz to join them was too early. I saw Rennes as a club that will help me progress and reach great heights".

Sarr made his debut for Rennes in the team's 2017–18 season opener against Troyes on 5 August 2017 and scored his first goal against Toulouse on 26 August.

His first season at the Breton club was curtailed by a malleolus fracture sustained in a match against Saint-Étienne on 24 September. On 28 September, it was announced by coach Christian Gourcuff that Sarr's injury would require surgery that would prevent him from playing until 2018.

Sarr ended the season with five goals and five assists from 24 Ligue 1 appearances as Rennes finished in fifth place and qualified for the 2018–19 UEFA Europa League.

During the 2018–19 season, Sarr made his UEFA Europa League debut, scoring the opening goal of a 2–1 against Czech club FK Jablonec on 20 September 2018. This goal was later included on a shortlist of ten for UEFA Goal of the Season. On 13 December 2018, he scored twice, as Rennes clinched qualified for the knockout phase with a 2–0 home win over FC Astana. His fourth Europa League goal of the season came from a header against Arsenal in a 3–1 round of 16 first leg win on 7 March 2019. However, on 14 March, Rennes lost the second leg in London 3–0 and were eliminated.

In Ligue 1, Sarr scored eight goals and registered six assists. His form saw him nominated for the Ligue 1 Young Player of the Season award.

He also made a significant contribution to Rennes winning their first Coupe de France in 48 years. On 6 January 2019, he scored the equalising goal in a 2–2 draw with Brest and scored in the subsequent penalty shootout that took the team through to the fourth round of the tournament. On 2 April, he assisted Senegalese teammate M'Baye Niang's opening goal in an eventual 3–2 semi-final win against Lyon. Rennes went on to face Paris Saint Germain at the Stade de France in the 2019 Coupe de France Final on 27 April, with Sarr scoring the winning kick of the penalty shootout after the underdogs had recovered from a 2–0 deficit to draw 2–2 during regulation time.

Overall, Sarr scored 18 goals and registered 16 assists from 77 appearances for Rennes.

=== Watford ===
On 8 August 2019, Sarr joined Premier League club Watford on a five-year contract. The transfer fee paid to Rennes was a club record for Watford and reported as "in the region of €30 million".

Sarr made his debut for Watford as a substitute in a 3–1 Premier League defeat to West Ham United at Vicarage Road on 24 August 2019. Three days later, on his first start for Watford, he scored his first goal in English football in an EFL Cup tie against Coventry City. On 30 November 2019, Sarr scored his first Premier League goal in a 2–1 loss at Southampton. On 22 December, he was voted man of the match in Watford's 2–0 home win over Manchester United – a match in which he scored the opening goal and was fouled for the penalty kick that was converted by captain Troy Deeney. On 29 February 2020, Sarr scored twice and assisted Deeney's third goal in Watford's 3–0 home victory over defending European Champions Liverpool, handing them their first defeat of the 2019–20 season and ending the club's 44-match unbeaten league run. On 26 July, Watford were relegated to the EFL Championship after losing 3–2 to Arsenal at the Emirates Stadium in their final match of the season. Sarr ended 2019–20 with five goals and four assists in the Premier League.

During 2020–21, Sarr scored thirteen goals and provided ten assists, winning Watford's Player of the Season. On 24 April 2021, he scored the only goal of a 1–0 win over Millwall which ensured Watford's promotion back to the Premier League.

Sarr started 2021–22 by scoring five goals in the opening twelve Premier League matches. This included scoring once in a 3–2 win against Aston Villa in the opening game of the season, twice in a 3–1 win at Norwich City, once in a 1–1 draw at home to Newcastle United, and once in a 4–1 home win over Manchester United. However, Sarr struggled with injury for the rest of the season and did not score in his final ten appearances as Watford were relegated for the second time in three seasons.

On 8 August 2022, Sarr scored a goal from his own half in a 1–1 draw with West Bromwich Albion at The Hawthorns. The goal was later awarded EFL Championship Goal of the Season. On 5 October, he played his 100th match for Watford, scoring in a 2–1 loss to Swansea City. Sarr ended the season with 10 goals from 39 matches in all competitions.

During his four seasons at Watford, he scored a 34 goals from 131 appearances.

=== Marseille ===
On 24 July 2023, Sarr joined French club Marseille for an undisclosed fee.

Sarr made his debut for Marseille in a 1–0 loss to Panathinaikos in a UEFA Champions League qualifier on 9 August. He scored his first goal in a 2–0 Ligue 1 win over Brest at the Stade Vélodrome on 26 August.

After an impressive start on his return to France, recording five goal involvements in his first nine matches, Sarr struggled with form and fitness for most of the 2023–24 season. Overall, he registered three goals and three assists from 15 league starts, in addition to two goals and three assists in the club's run to the UEFA Europa League semi-finals, where they were beaten 4–1 on aggregate by eventual winners Atalanta.

=== Crystal Palace ===
On 1 August 2024, Sarr returned to the Premier League, signing for Crystal Palace. He was assigned the number 7 shirt, previously worn by Michael Olise, who had departed for Bayern Munich.

Sarr made his debut for Crystal Palace as an 84th-minute substitute for Chris Richards in their opening match of the 2024–25 Premier League season, a 2–1 loss at Brentford on 18 August.

On 27 August, he scored his first goal for the club in a 4–0 EFL Cup win over Norwich City; the goal, initially attributed to Eberechi Eze, was awarded to Sarr a week later.

His first league goal for the Eagles came in a 2–2 draw at Aston Villa on 23 November. After scoring in the fourth minute, he went on to record an assist for Justin Devenny in first-half stoppage time. On 15 December, he scored twice and assisted a goal for Trevoh Chalobah in Palace's 3–1 win at rivals Brighton & Hove Albion, winning the Man of the Match award.

During Palace's run to the 2025 FA Cup final, Sarr scored the team's second goal in the 3–0 quarter-final win at Fulham and then scored two goals and assisted the other in the 3–0 semi-final defeat of Aston Villa at Wembley Stadium. On 17 May 2025, Sarr played in the FA Cup final and won the FA Cup as Crystal Palace beat Manchester City 1–0 to win their first major trophy. Sarr followed this up by scoring in the 2025 FA Community Shield which Palace won against Liverpool.

On 30 April 2026, Sarr scored the fastest goal in the UEFA Conference League after 21 seconds in a 3–1 away win over Shakhtar Donetsk in the semi-final first leg, surpassing previous record of Ferdy Druijf. A few weeks later, on 10 May, he scored his 20th goal of the season in all competitions in a 2–2 draw with Everton, becoming the first Crystal Palace player to reach that mark since Glenn Murray did so in the 2012–13 season. On 28 May, he played all 90 minutes in the 2026 UEFA Conference League final as Palace won 1–0 against Rayo Vallecano.

== International career ==
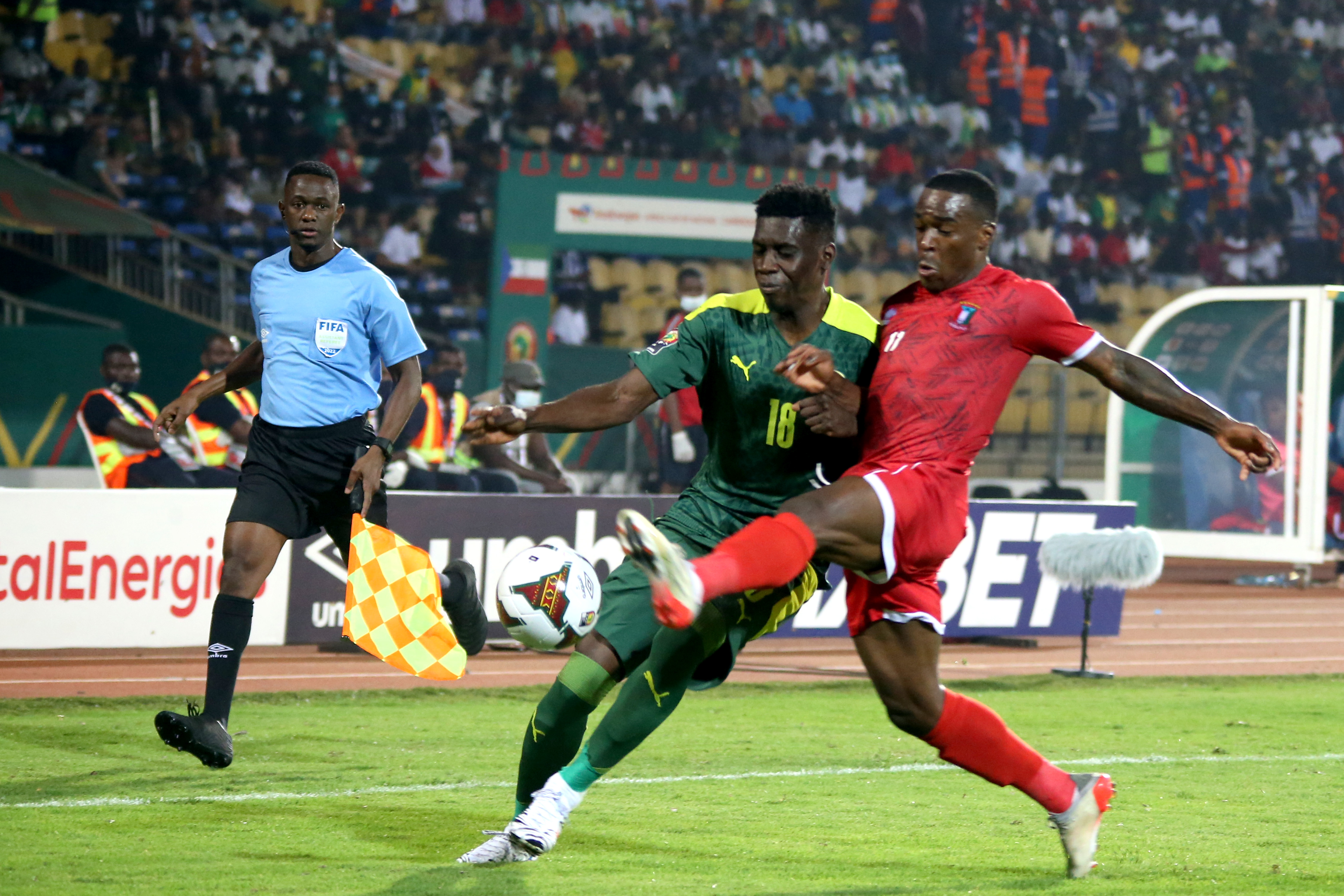
Sarr playing for Senegal in 2021 Africa Cup of Nations

Sarr has represented his country with the Senegal U23 national team. In 2015, he played in 2015 Africa U-23 Cup of Nations. At that time, his age was only 17. He contributed that Senegal finished the competition in a fourth place, playing three games.

He played for the first time with Senegal national team for a match against Namibia in September 2016 in Dakar (2–0) for 2017 Africa Cup of Nations qualification, for which Senegal had already qualified. As a symbol, he came into play in the 67th minute in place of the former resident of Génération Foot and Metz, Sadio Mané. On 8 January 2017, Sarr scored his first international goal in a friendly match against Libya in Stade Municipal de Kintélé, Brazzaville.

In May 2018, he was named in Senegal's 23-man squad for the 2018 FIFA World Cup in Russia. He started all three group matches at the tournament as Senegal beat Poland 2–1, drew 2–2 with Japan and lost 1–0 to Colombia.

In 2019, Sarr was part of the Senegal squad that reached the final of the Africa Cup of Nations, for only the second time in the nation's history. He played the full 90 minutes of the final on 19 July 2019, as they lost 1–0 to Algeria.

Sarr was part of Senegal's squad for the 2021 Africa Cup of Nations; the Lions of Teranga went on to win the tournament for the first time in their history. He scored once in a 3–1 win over Equatorial Guinea at the quarter-final stage.

He was appointed a Grand Officer of the National Order of the Lion by President of Senegal Macky Sall following the nation's victory at the tournament.

Sarr started all four of Senegal's matches at the 2022 FIFA World Cup, scoring in a 2–1 win over Ecuador that qualified the nation for the round of 16 for the first time since its debut in 2002.

In December 2023, he was named in Senegal's squad for the postponed 2023 Africa Cup of Nations held in the Ivory Coast. He started all four matches for the team, registering an assist in a 3–0 win over The Gambia, and both scoring and assisting once in a 3–1 win over Cameroon.

=== 2026 FIFA World Cup ===
On 21 May 2026, Sarr was selected by Senegal's coach Pape Thiaw in the 26-man squad for the 2026 FIFA World Cup.

In Senegal's second group-stage match, he netted a brace in a 3–2 defeat against Norway, becoming the country's joint top scorer at the World Cup with three goals, alongside Papa Bouba Diop. A week later, on 26 June, he netted a goal and provided an assist in a 5–0 victory over Iraq, becoming Senegal's all-time top scorer at the World Cup with four goals and the third African player to score three goals in the group stage, following Papa Bouba Diop and Ismael Saibari.

He scored in the first knockout-stage match against Belgium on 1 July, which ended in a 3–2 defeat after extra time. With that goal, he became only the second African player, after Roger Milla, to score four goals in a single World Cup campaign, taking also his overall World Cup tally to five goals, moving behind only Asamoah Gyan among African goalscorers in the tournament's history. He also became the second African player to score in three consecutive World Cup matches after Ismael Saibari.

== Personal life ==
Sarr holds French citizenship from his mother.

== Career statistics ==
=== Club ===
As of match played 22 October 2026

Appearances and goals by club, season and competition
| Club | Season | League | | | National cup (Note: Includes Coupe de France, FA Cup) | | League cup (Note: Includes Coupe de la Ligue, EFL Cup) | | Europe | | Other | | Total | |
| Club | Season | Division | Apps | Goals | Apps | Goals | Apps | Goals | Apps | Goals | Apps | Goals | Apps | Goals |
|---|---|---|---|---|---|---|---|---|---|---|---|---|---|---|
| Metz | 2016–17 | Ligue 1 | 31 | 5 | 0 | 0 | 2 | 0 | — | | — | | 33 | 5 |
| Rennes | 2017–18 | Ligue 1 | 24 | 5 | 1 | 0 | 2 | 0 | — | | — | | 27 | 5 |
| Rennes | 2018–19 | Ligue 1 | 35 | 8 | 5 | 1 | 1 | 0 | 9 (Note: Appearances in UEFA Europa League) | 4 | — | | 50 | 13 |
| Rennes | Total | | 59 | 13 | 6 | 1 | 3 | 0 | 9 | 4 | — | | 77 | 18 |
| Watford | 2019–20 | Premier League | 28 | 5 | 0 | 0 | 2 | 1 | — | | — | | 30 | 6 |
| Watford | 2020–21 | Championship | 39 | 13 | 1 | 0 | 0 | 0 | — | | — | | 40 | 13 |
| Watford | 2021–22 | Premier League | 22 | 5 | 0 | 0 | 0 | 0 | — | | — | | 22 | 5 |
| Watford | 2022–23 | Championship | 39 | 10 | 0 | 0 | 0 | 0 | — | | — | | 39 | 10 |
| Watford | Total | | 128 | 33 | 1 | 0 | 2 | 1 | — | | — | | 131 | 34 |
| Marseille | 2023–24 | Ligue 1 | 23 | 3 | 0 | 0 | — | | 12 (Note: Two appearances in UEFA Champions League, ten appearances and one goal in UEFA Europa League) | 1 | — | | 35 | 4 |
| Crystal Palace | 2024–25 | Premier League | 38 | 8 | 5 | 3 | 4 | 1 | — | | — | | 47 | 12 |
| Crystal Palace | 2025–26 | Premier League | 28 | 9 | 0 | 0 | 1 | 2 | 15 (Note: Appearances in UEFA Conference League) | 9 | 1 (Note: Appearance in FA Community Shield) | 1 | 45 | 21 |
| Crystal Palace | 2026–27 | Premier League | 2 | 0 | 0 | 0 | 0 | 0 | 3 | 0 | — | | 5 | 0 |
| Crystal Palace | Total | | 68 | 17 | 5 | 3 | 5 | 3 | 18 | 9 | 1 | 1 | 97 | 33 |
| Career total | | | 309 | 71 | 12 | 4 | 12 | 4 | 39 | 14 | 1 | 1 | 373 | 94 |

=== International ===
As of match played 1 July 2026

Appearances and goals by national team and year
| National team | Year | Apps | Goals |
|---|---|---|---|
| Senegal | 2016 | 1 | 0 |
| Senegal | 2017 | 9 | 2 |
| Senegal | 2018 | 10 | 1 |
| Senegal | 2019 | 9 | 1 |
| Senegal | 2020 | 3 | 1 |
| Senegal | 2021 | 8 | 4 |
| Senegal | 2022 | 12 | 2 |
| Senegal | 2023 | 4 | 0 |
| Senegal | 2024 | 13 | 3 |
| Senegal | 2025 | 9 | 4 |
| Senegal | 2026 | 10 | 5 |
| Total | | 88 | 23 |

Scores and results list Senegal's goal tally first.

List of international goals scored by Ismaïla Sarr
| No. | Date | Venue | Opponent | Score | Result | Competition |
|---|---|---|---|---|---|---|
| 1 | 8 January 2017 | Stade Municipal de Kintélé, Brazzaville, Congo | Libya | 2–1 | 2–1 | Friendly |
| 2 | 5 September 2017 | Stade du 4 Août, Ouagadougou, Burkina Faso | Burkina Faso | 1–1 | 2–2 | 2018 FIFA World Cup qualification |
| 3 | 8 June 2018 | Gradski Vrt Stadium, Osijek, Croatia | Croatia | 1–0 | 1–2 | Friendly |
| 4 | 1 July 2019 | 30 June Stadium, Cairo, Egypt | Kenya | 1–0 | 3–0 | 2019 Africa Cup of Nations |
| 5 | 9 October 2020 | Prince Moulay Abdellah Stadium, Rabat, Morocco | Morocco | 1–3 | 1–3 | Friendly |
| 6 | 5 June 2021 | Stade Lat-Dior, Thiès, Senegal | Zambia | 3–0 | 3–1 | Friendly |
| 7 | 7 September 2021 | Stade Alphonse Massamba-Débat, Brazzaville, Congo | Congo | 2–1 | 3–1 | 2022 FIFA World Cup qualification |
| 8 | 14 November 2021 | Stade Lat-Dior, Thiès, Senegal | Congo | 1–0 | 2–0 | 2022 FIFA World Cup qualification |
| 9 | 14 November 2021 | Stade Lat-Dior, Thiès, Senegal | Congo | 2–0 | 2–0 | 2022 FIFA World Cup qualification |
| 10 | 30 January 2022 | Ahmadou Ahidjo Stadium, Yaoundé, Cameroon | Equatorial Guinea | 3–1 | 3–1 | 2021 Africa Cup of Nations |
| 11 | 29 November 2022 | Khalifa International Stadium, Al Rayyan, Qatar | Ecuador | 1–0 | 2–1 | 2022 FIFA World Cup |
| 12 | 19 January 2024 | Charles Konan Banny Stadium, Yamoussoukro, Ivory Coast | Cameroon | 1–0 | 3–1 | 2023 Africa Cup of Nations |
| 13 | 6 June 2024 | Diamniadio Olympic Stadium, Diamniadio, Senegal | DR Congo | 1–0 | 1–1 | 2026 FIFA World Cup qualification |
| 14 | 9 September 2024 | Bingu National Stadium, Lilongwe, Malawi | Burundi | 1–0 | 1–0 | 2025 Africa Cup of Nations qualification |
| 15 | 6 June 2025 | Aviva Stadium, Dublin, Ireland | Republic of Ireland | 1–1 | 1–1 | Friendly |
| 16 | 10 June 2025 | City Ground, Nottingham, England | England | 1–1 | 3–1 | Friendly |
| 17 | 10 October 2025 | Juba Stadium, Juba, South Sudan | South Sudan | 1–0 | 5–0 | 2026 FIFA World Cup qualification |
| 18 | 10 October 2025 | Juba Stadium, Juba, South Sudan | South Sudan | 3–0 | 5–0 | 2026 FIFA World Cup qualification |
| 19 | 28 March 2026 | Stade de France, Saint-Denis, France | Peru | 2–0 | 2–0 | Friendly |
| 20 | 22 June 2026 | MetLife Stadium, East Rutherford, United States | Norway | 1–2 | 2–3 | 2026 FIFA World Cup |
| 21 | 22 June 2026 | MetLife Stadium, East Rutherford, United States | Norway | 2–3 | 2–3 | 2026 FIFA World Cup |
| 22 | 26 June 2026 | BMO Field, Toronto, Canada | Iraq | 2–0 | 5–0 | 2026 FIFA World Cup |
| 23 | 1 July 2026 | Lumen Field, Seattle, United States | Belgium | 2–0 | 2–3 (a.e.t.) | 2026 FIFA World Cup |

== Honours ==
Rennes

- Coupe de France: 2018–19

Crystal Palace

- FA Cup: 2024–25
- FA Community Shield: 2025
- UEFA Conference League: 2025–26

Senegal

- Africa Cup of Nations: 2021; runner-up: 2019, 2025

Individual

- EFL Goal of the Season: 2022–23
- UEFA Europa League Goal of the Season: 2018–19
- Watford Player of the Season: 2020–21
- Watford Players' Player of the Season: 2020–21
- Crystal Palace Player of the Season: 2025–26
- Crystal Palace Players' Player of the Season: 2025–26
- UEFA Conference League top scorer: 2025–26
- UEFA Conference League Player of the Season: 2025–26
- UEFA Conference League Team of the Season: 2025–26

Orders

- Grand Officer of the National Order of the Lion: 2022

== See also ==
- List of FIFA World Cup top goalscorers
