= Mason Barrett =

English footballer (born 1999)

Personal information
- Full name: Mason Earle Barrett
- Date of birth: 24 September 1999 (age 27)
- Place of birth: Redbridge, England
- Height: 1.90 m (6 ft 3 in)
- Position: Defender

Team information
- Current team: Wealdstone
- Number: 6

Youth career
- –2019: West Ham United
- 2019–2020: Watford

Senior career*
Years	Team	Apps	(Gls)
2020–2021	Watford	0	(0)
2022–	Wealdstone	71	(2)
2026	→ Farnborough (loan)	4	(0)
- * Club domestic league appearances and goals as of 7 October 2026 (UTC)

Mason Earle Barrett (born 24 September 1999) is a professional footballer who plays as a defender for National League club Wealdstone.

== Career ==
Barrett began his career at West Ham United, before signing for Watford in August 2019 on a two-year deal.

On 4 January 2020, Barrett made his debut for Watford in a 3–3 FA Cup third round draw against Tranmere Rovers.

On 30 July 2022, Barrett signed for Wealdstone, following a successful trial period at the club. He made his debut for the club a week later, in a 3–2 win against Bromley. He made 23 appearances in his first season at the club, and signed a contract extension in May 2023. On 11 April 2024, Barrett scored his first professional goal in a 4–2 victory over Dorking Wanderers. Nine days later, he scored the winning goal in a 3–2 victory away at Oldham Athletic that helped ensure Wealdstone's National League survival. In October 2024, Barrett suffered a knee injury that ruled him out of football for a year.

On 16 January 2026, Barrett joined National League South side Farnborough on a 28-day loan. He subsequently returned to Wealdstone, and signed a contract extension in June 2026.

== Career statistics ==
As of match played 29 September 2026

Appearances and goals by club, season and competition
Club	Season	League			FA Cup		League Cup		Other		Total	
Club	Season	Division	Apps	Goals	Apps	Goals	Apps	Goals	Apps	Goals	Apps	Goals
Watford	2019–20	Premier League	0	0	2	0	0	0	—		2	0
Watford	2020–21	Championship	0	0	0	0	0	0	—		0	0
Watford	Total		0	0	2	0	0	0	—		2	0
Wealdstone	2022–23	National League	21	0	1	0	—		1 (Note: Appearance in the FA Trophy)	0	23	0
Wealdstone	2023–24	National League	25	2	1	0	—		3	0	29	2
Wealdstone	2024–25	National League	9	0	1	0	—		0	0	10	0
Wealdstone	2025–26	National League	6	0	0	0	—		0	0	6	0
Wealdstone	2026–27	National League	10	0	0	0	—		0	0	10	0
Wealdstone	Total		71	2	3	0	0	0	4	0	78	2
Farnborough (loan)	2025–26	National League South	4	0	—		—		—		4	0
Career total			75	2	5	0	0	0	4	0	84	2
