= 2019–20 Watford F.C. season =

English football team season

Watford
2019–20 season
- Owner: Gino Pozzo
- Chairman: Scott Duxbury
- Head Coach: Javi Gracia (until 7 September); Quique Sánchez Flores (from 8 September to 1 December); Nigel Pearson (from 6 December to 19 July); Hayden Mullins (interim, from 19 July)
- Stadium: Vicarage Road
- Premier League: 19th (relegated)
- FA Cup: Third round (eliminated by Tranmere Rovers)
- EFL Cup: Fourth round (eliminated by Everton)
- Top goalscorer: League: Troy Deeney (10 goals); All: Troy Deeney (10 goals)
Home colours	Away colours	Third colours

The 2019–20 season was Watford's 121st year in their history and fifth consecutive season in the Premier League. They also participated in the FA Cup and the EFL Cup. The season covered the period from 1 July 2019 to 26 July 2020.

Javi Gracia was sacked on 7 September 2019, after a poor start to the season saw Watford bottom with just one point. He was replaced by former manager, Quique Sánchez Flores However, on 1 December 2019, Flores was sacked after securing only a single victory in his second stint in charge. Nigel Pearson was appointed manager on 6 December 2019 on a season-long contract. On 19 July 2020, Pearson was sacked with two games remaining in the 2019–20 season. Watford were seven points adrift at the bottom of the league when Pearson took charge, and three points above the relegation zone when he was sacked. Following Pearson's sacking, under interim manager Hayden Mullins, Watford went on to lose their remaining two games and were relegated.

== Transfers ==
=== Transfers in ===
Date	Position	Nationality	Name	From	Fee	Team	Ref.
1 July 2019	AM	(Bermuda)	Kane Crichlow	(England) AFC Wimbledon	Free transfer	Under-23s	
1 July 2019	CB	(England)	Craig Dawson	(England) West Bromwich Albion	Undisclosed	First team	
1 July 2019	CB	(England)	Bayli Spencer-Adams	(England) Arsenal	Free transfer	Under-23s	
12 July 2019	CB	(England)	Jamal Balogun	(England) Reading	Free transfer	Under-23s	
12 July 2019	CF	(England)	Sam Dalby	(England) Leeds United	Undisclosed	Under-23s	
12 July 2019	LB	(England)	Cameron Green	(England) Reading	Free transfer	Under-23s	
12 July 2019	CM	(England)	Henry Wise	Free agent	Free transfer	Under-23s	
24 July 2019	CM	(Nigeria)	Tom Dele-Bashiru	(England) Manchester City	Free transfer	Under-23s	
2 August 2019	CB	(England)	Mason Barrett	(England) West Ham United	Free transfer	Under-23s	
2 August 2019	DM	(England)	Callum Whelan	(England) Manchester United	Free transfer	Under-23s	
7 August 2019	CF	(England)	Danny Welbeck	(England) Arsenal	Free transfer	First team	
8 August 2019	RW	(Senegal)	Ismaïla Sarr	(France) Rennes	€30,000,000	First team	
22 August 2019	SS	(England)	Kaylen Hinds	Free agent	Free transfer	Under-23s	
1 January 2020	CF	(Brazil)	João Pedro	(Brazil) Fluminense	Undisclosed	First team	
14 January 2020	RW	(Argentina)	Ignacio Pussetto	(Italy) Udinese	€8,000,000	First team	
30 January 2020	GK	(England)	Myles Roberts	(England) Reading	Undisclosed	Under-23s	
31 January 2020	CB	(England)	Teddy Perkins	(England) Burnley	Undisclosed	Under-23s	

=== Loans out ===
Date from	Position	Nationality	Name	To	Date until	Team	Ref.
1 July 2019	CF	(England)	Jerome Sinclair	(Netherlands) VVV-Venlo	30 June 2020	First team	
1 July 2019	CF	(Colombia)	Luis Suárez	(Spain) Zaragoza	30 June 2020	Under-23s	
3 July 2019	LB	(Ecuador)	Pervis Estupiñán	(Spain) Osasuna	30 June 2021	Under-23s	
9 July 2019	FW	(England)	Michael Folivi	(England) AFC Wimbledon	30 June 2020	Under-23s	
14 July 2019	RB	(Ghana)	Kingsley Fobi	(Spain) Badajoz	30 June 2020	Under-23s	
22 July 2019	CF	(Brazil)	Matheus Aias	(Spain) Mirandés	30 June 2020	Under-23s	
24 July 2019	RB	(Spain)	Marc Navarro	(Spain) Leganés	30 June 2020	First team	
25 July 2019	CB	(England)	Ben Wilmot	(Wales) Swansea City	30 June 2020	First team	
26 July 2019	CF	(Scotland)	Alex Jakubiak	(England) Gillingham	31 January 2020	Under-23s	
31 July 2019	AM	(Colombia)	Juergen Elitim	(Spain) Marbella	30 June 2020	Under-23s	
1 August 2019	CM	(Ghana)	Kwasi Sibo	(Spain) Ibiza	30 June 2020	Under-23s	
22 August 2019	CB	(England)	Harry Hudson	(England) Cray Wanderers	30 October 2019	Academy	
22 August 2019	CM	(Trinidad and Tobago)	Daniel Phillips	(England) Hemel Hempstead Town	January 2020	Academy	
22 August 2019	LM	(Sweden)	Ken Sema	(Italy) Udinese	30 June 2020	First team	
26 August 2019	CF	(Colombia)	Cucho Hernández	(Spain) Mallorca	30 June 2020	First team	
2 September 2019	CF	(Venezuela)	Adalberto Peñaranda	(Belgium) Eupen	30 June 2020	First team	
6 September 2019	LB	(England)	Cameron Green	(England) Braintree Town	1 January 2020	Under-23s	
6 September 2019	GK	(England)	James Hoskins	(England) Northwood	2 October 2019	Academy	
15 November 2019	GK	(England)	Dante Baptiste	(England) Hendon	Youth loan	Academy	
1 January 2020	RB	(Guadeloupe)	Dimitri Foulquier	(Spain) Granada	30 June 2020	First team	
31 January 2020	GK	(Sweden)	Pontus Dahlberg	(Netherlands) FC Emmen	30 June 2020	First team	
31 January 2020	MF	(England)	Harry Forster	(England) St Albans City	30 June 2020	Academy	
31 January 2020	LB	(Scotland)	Lewis Gordon	(England) St Albans City	30 June 2020	Academy	
31 January 2020	CF	(Scotland)	Alex Jakubiak	(Scotland) St Mirren	30 June 2020	Under-23s	
13 March 2020	GK	(England)	Harvey White	(England) Hendon	30 June 2020	Under-23s	

=== Transfers out ===
Date	Position	Nationality	Name	To	Fee	Team	Ref.
1 July 2019	CB	(Uruguay)	Miguel Britos	Free agent	Released	First team	
1 July 2019	CM	(England)	Ashley Charles	Free agent	Released	Under-23s	
1 July 2019	CM	(England)	Andrew Eleftheriou	(England) Dagenham & Redbridge	Released	Under-23s	
1 July 2019	CB	(Republic of Ireland)	Tommie Hoban	Free agent	Released	First team	
1 July 2019	GK	(England)	Sam Howes	(England) Woking	Released	Under-23s	
1 July 2019	CB	(Northern Ireland)	Tom Leighton	Free agent	Released	Academy	
1 July 2019	DM	(The Gambia)	Sulayman Marreh	(Belgium) Eupen	Undisclosed	Under-23s	
1 July 2019	RB	(England)	Michael Mullings	Free agent	Released	Academy	
1 July 2019	CF	(Belgium)	Obbi Oularé	(Belgium) Standard Liège	Undisclosed	First team	
1 July 2019	LM	(England)	Kai Sanders	Free agent	Released	Academy	
1 July 2019	AM	(England)	Sam Sesay	Free agent	Released	Academy	
1 July 2019	DF	(England)	Ryan Suckling	Free agent	Released	Academy	
1 July 2019	CB	(England)	Ben Tricker	(England) Fulham	Released	Academy	
1 August 2019	RW	(Belgium)	Dodi Lukebakio	(Germany) Hertha BSC	Undisclosed	First team	
2 September 2019	CF	(Italy)	Stefano Okaka	(Italy) Udinese	Undisclosed	First team	
19 December 2019	CB	(England)	Joy Mukena	(England) Bracknell Town	Free transfer	Under-23s	
24 January 2020	LB	(Netherlands)	Marvin Zeegelaar	(Italy) Udinese	Undisclosed	First team	
31 January 2020	CB	(Austria)	Sebastian Prödl	Free agent	Mutual consent	First team	

== Pre-season and friendlies ==
In June 2019. The Hornets confirmed their pre-season schedule.

Win Draw Loss Upcoming Void Postponed

18 July 2019 Friendly	Ajax	2–1	Watford	Saalfelden, Austria
18:00 CEST	Gray 39' (pen.)	Report	Van de Beek 52'; Timber 89'	Stadium: SaalfeldenArena; Attendance: 27,321

20 July 2019 Friendly	Bayer Leverkusen	1–2	Watford	Zell am See, Austria
15:00 CEST	Diaby 66'	Report	Hughes 35'; Gray 56'	Stadium: Alois Latini Stadion

27 July 2019 Friendly	Queens Park Rangers	0–1	Watford	Shepherd's Bush, London
15:00 BST		Report	Capoue 31'	Stadium: Loftus Road

3 August 2019 Friendly	Watford	2–1	Real Sociedad	Watford
15:00 BST	Gray 48', 88'	Report	Oyarzabal 27' (pen.)	Stadium: Vicarage Road

13 June 2020 Friendly	Watford	2–0	Brentford	Watford
12:30 BST	Capoue 33'; Sarr 90'	Report		Stadium: Vicarage Road

== Competitions ==
=== Premier League ===
==== League table ====
Pos	Team	Pld	W	D	L	GF	GA	GD	Pts	Qualification or relegation
16	West Ham United	38	10	9	19	49	62	−13	39	
17	Aston Villa	38	9	8	21	41	67	−26	35	
18	Bournemouth (R)	38	9	7	22	40	65	−25	34	Relegation to EFL Championship
19	Watford (R)	38	8	10	20	36	64	−28	34	Relegation to EFL Championship
20	Norwich City (R)	38	5	6	27	26	75	−49	21	Relegation to EFL Championship

Source: Premier League
Rules for classification: 1) Points; 2) Goal difference; 3) Goals scored; 4) If the champions, relegated teams or qualified teams for UEFA competitions cannot be determined by rules 1 to 3, rules 4.1 to 4.3 are applied – 4.1) Points gained in head to head record between such teams; 4.2) Away goals scored in head to head record between such teams; 4.3) Play-offs
(R) Relegated

==== Results summary ====
Overall								Home						Away					
Pld	W	D	L	GF	GA	GD	Pts	W	D	L	GF	GA	GD	W	D	L	GF	GA	GD
38	8	10	20	36	64	−28	34	6	6	7	22	27	−5	2	4	13	14	37	−23

Last updated: 26 July 2020.
Source: BBC

==== Results by matchday ====
Matchday	1	2	3	4	5	6	7	8	9	10	11	12	13	14	15	16	17	18	19	20	21	22	23	24	25	26	27	28	29	30	31	32	33	34	35	36	37	38
Ground	H	A	H	A	H	A	A	H	A	H	H	A	H	A	A	H	A	H	A	H	H	A	H	A	H	A	A	H	A	H	A	H	A	H	H	A	H	A
Result	L	L	L	D	D	L	L	D	D	D	L	W	L	L	L	D	L	W	D	W	W	W	D	L	L	D	L	W	L	D	L	L	L	W	W	L	L	L
Position	18	20	20	20	20	20	20	20	20	20	20	18	20	20	20	20	20	20	19	19	19	17	17	19	19	19	19	17	17	16	16	17	17	17	17	17	18	19

Updated to match(es) played on 26 July 2020. Source:
A = Away; H = Home; W = Win; D = Draw; L = Loss

==== Matches ====
On 13 June 2019, the Premier League fixtures were announced.

10 August 2019 1	Watford	0–3	Brighton & Hove Albion	Watford
15:00 BST		Report	Doucouré 28' (o.g.); Andone 65'; Maupay 77'; Dunk (yellow card) 88'	Stadium: Vicarage Road; Attendance: 20,245; Referee: Craig Pawson

17 August 2019 2	Everton	1–0	Watford	Merseyside
15:00 BST	Bernard 10'; Coleman (yellow card) 14'; Gomes (yellow card) 47'	Report	Capoue (yellow card) 31'; Holebas (yellow card) 59'; Pereyra (yellow card) 62'	Stadium: Goodison Park; Attendance: 39,066; Referee: Lee Mason

24 August 2019 3	Watford	1–3	West Ham United	Watford
15:00 BST	Gray 17'; Holebas (yellow card) 63'	Report	Noble 3' (pen.); Haller 64', 73'; Ogbonna (yellow card) 76'	Stadium: Vicarage Road; Attendance: 20,035; Referee: Chris Kavanagh

31 August 2019 4	Newcastle United	1–1	Watford	Newcastle
15:00 BST	Hayden (yellow card) 31'; Schär 41'; Dummett (yellow card) 44'	Report	Hughes 2'; Doucouré (yellow card) 29'; Dawson (yellow card) 44'; Cathcart (yellow card) 55'	Stadium: St. James' Park; Attendance: 44,157; Referee: Graham Scott

15 September 2019 5	Watford	2–2	Arsenal	Watford
16:30 BST	Holebas (yellow card) 45+2'; Cleverley 54'; Femenía (yellow card) 56'; Pereyra 81' (pen.); Capoue (yellow card) 90+2'	Report	Aubameyang 21', 32'; Kolašinac (yellow card) 43'; Guendouzi (yellow card) 45+2'; Leno (yellow card) 77'	Stadium: Vicarage Road; Attendance: 21,360; Referee: Anthony Taylor
Note: Live on Sky Sports

21 September 2019 6	Manchester City	8–0	Watford	Manchester
15:00 BST	D. Silva 1'; Agüero 7' (pen.); Mahrez 12'; B. Silva 15', 49', 60', (yellow card) 19'; Otamendi 18'; Angeliño (yellow card) 81'; De Bruyne 85'	Report	Femenía (yellow card) 59'; Deulofeu (yellow card) 59'	Stadium: Etihad Stadium; Attendance: 54,273; Referee: Mike Dean

28 September 2019 7	Wolverhampton Wanderers	2–0	Watford	Wolverhampton
15:00 BST	Doherty 18'; Janmaat 61' (o.g.)	Report	Holebas (yellow card) 68'	Stadium: Molineux; Attendance: 30,711; Referee: Paul Tierney

5 October 2019 8	Watford	0–0	Sheffield United	Watford
15:00 BST		Report	McBurnie (yellow card) 57'; Lundstram (yellow card) 90+1'	Stadium: Vicarage Road; Attendance: 20,811; Referee: Andre Marriner

19 October 2019 9	Tottenham Hotspur	1–1	Watford	Tottenham
15:00 BST	Sánchez (yellow card) 13'; Sissoko (yellow card) 77'; Alli 86', (yellow card) 90'; Rose (yellow card) 89'	Report	Doucouré 6'; Pereyra (yellow card) 84'; Kiko (yellow card) 88'; Holebas (yellow card) 90'	Stadium: Tottenham Hotspur Stadium; Attendance: 58,754; Referee: Chris Kavanagh

26 October 2019 10	Watford	0–0	Bournemouth	Watford
15:00 BST	Dawson (yellow card) 41'; Deulofeu (yellow card) 77'; Doucouré (yellow card) 85'; Hughes (yellow card) 87'; Pereyra (yellow card) 89'	Report	Wilson (yellow card) 65'; Rico (yellow card) 73'; Billing (yellow card) 80'	Stadium: Vicarage Road; Attendance: 20,821; Referee: Mike Dean

2 November 2019 11	Watford	1–2	Chelsea	Watford
17:30 GMT	Kabasele (yellow card) 46'; Janmaat (yellow card) 70'; Deulofeu 80' (pen.); Dawson (yellow card) 82'; Mariappa (yellow card) 88'	Report	Abraham 5'; Pulisic 55'; Jorginho (yellow card) 89'; Mount (yellow card) 90+6'	Stadium: Vicarage Road; Attendance: 21,011; Referee: Anthony Taylor

8 November 2019 12	Norwich City	0–2	Watford	Norwich
20:00 GMT	Vrančić (yellow card) 86'	Report	Deulofeu 2'; Kabasele (yellow card) 49' (yellow-red card) 65'; Gray 52'; Hughes (yellow card) 69'; Masina (yellow card) 90+3'	Stadium: Carrow Road; Attendance: 27,074; Referee: Andre Marriner

23 November 2019 13	Watford	0–3	Burnley	Watford
15:00 GMT	Gray (yellow card) 25'	Report	Mee (yellow card) 30'; Tarkowski (yellow card) 45+4', (goal) 88'; Wood 53'; Westwood (yellow card) 60'; Barnes 82' (pen.)	Stadium: Vicarage Road; Attendance: 19,711; Referee: Paul Tierney

30 November 2019 14	Southampton	2–1	Watford	Southampton
17:30 GMT	Redmond (yellow card) 48'; Ings 78'; Ward-Prowse 83'	Report	Sarr 24'	Stadium: St Mary's Stadium; Attendance: 26,929; Referee: Michael Oliver

4 December 2019 15	Leicester City	2–0	Watford	Leicester
19:30 GMT	Vardy (yellow card) 38', (goal) 55' (pen.); Söyüncü (yellow card) 41'; Ndidi (yellow card) 63'; Maddison 90+6'	Report	Deulofeu (yellow card) 46'; Masina (yellow card) 90+1'	Stadium: King Power Stadium; Attendance: 31,763; Referee: Craig Pawson

7 December 2019 16	Watford	0–0	Crystal Palace	Watford
15:00 GMT	Doucouré (yellow card) 34'; Cathcart (yellow card) 40'; Femenía (yellow card) 87'; Capoue (yellow card) 90+3'	Report	Zaha (yellow card) 38'; Tomkins (yellow card) 72'	Stadium: Vicarage Road; Attendance: 20,070; Referee: Martin Atkinson

14 December 2019 17	Liverpool	2–0	Watford	Liverpool
12:30 GMT	Salah 38', 90'; Henderson (yellow card) 43'; Milner (yellow card) 57'	Report	Hughes (yellow card) 24'	Stadium: Anfield; Attendance: 53,311; Referee: Andre Marriner

22 December 2019 18	Watford	2–0	Manchester United	Watford
14:00 GMT	Capoue (yellow card) 36'; Sarr 50'; Doucouré (yellow card) 51'; Deeney 54' (pen.); Cathcart (yellow card) 90+2'	Report	Shaw (yellow card) 38'	Stadium: Vicarage Road; Attendance: 21,488; Referee: Lee Mason

26 December 2019 19	Sheffield United	1–1	Watford	Sheffield
15:00 GMT	Norwood 36' (pen.)	Report	Deulofeu 27', (yellow card) 74'; Cathcart (yellow card) 46'; Chalobah (yellow card) 88'	Stadium: Bramall Lane; Attendance: 30,222; Referee: David Coote

28 December 2019 20	Watford	3–0	Aston Villa	Watford
15:00 GMT	Deeney 42', 67' (pen.), (yellow card) 90+2'; Mariappa (yellow card) 51' (yellow-red card) 57'; Sarr 71', (yellow card) 84'; Capoue (yellow card) 74'	Report	Grealish (yellow card) 90+6'	Stadium: Vicarage Road; Attendance: 21,348; Referee: Simon Hooper

1 January 2020 21	Watford	2–1	Wolverhampton Wanderers	Watford
15:00 GMT	Dawson (yellow card) 21'; Deulofeu 30'; Doucouré 49'; Kabasele (red card) 71'; Deeney (yellow card) 90+4'; Foster (yellow card) 90+6'	Report	Neto (yellow card) 26', (goal) 60'	Stadium: Vicarage Road; Attendance: 20,584; Referee: Andrew Madley

12 January 2020 22	Bournemouth	0–3	Watford	Bournemouth
14:00 GMT	Smith (yellow card) 13'	Report	Doucouré 43'; Deeney (yellow card) 57', (goal) 65'; Pereyra 90+3'	Stadium: Vitality Stadium; Attendance: 10,384; Referee: Mike Dean

18 January 2020 23	Watford	0–0	Tottenham Hotspur	Watford
12:30 GMT	Capoue (yellow card) 35'; Doucouré (yellow card) 60'	Report	Tanganga (yellow card) 19'; Winks (yellow card) 60'; Vertonghen (yellow card) 69'	Stadium: Vicarage Road; Attendance: 21,366; Referee: Michael Oliver

21 January 2020 24	Aston Villa	2–1	Watford	Birmingham
19:30 GMT	Mings (yellow card) 45+1', (goal) 90+5'; Douglas Luiz 68', (yellow card) 68'	Report	Deeney 38'; Cathcart (yellow card) 77'; Doucouré (yellow card) 81'	Stadium: Villa Park; Attendance: 40,867; Referee: Martin Atkinson

1 February 2020 25	Watford	2–3	Everton	Watford
15:00 GMT	Masina 10', (yellow card) 68'; Pereyra 42'; Success (yellow card) 78'	Report	Mina 45+1', 45+4', (yellow card) 84'; Delph (yellow card) 58' (yellow-red card) 71'; Holgate (yellow card) 86'; Walcott 90'	Stadium: Vicarage Road; Attendance: 21,229; Referee: Craig Pawson

8 February 2020 26	Brighton & Hove Albion	1–1	Watford	Falmer
17:30 GMT	Schelotto (yellow card) 35'; Mariappa 78' (o.g.); March (yellow card) 90+3'	Report	Doucouré 19'; Hughes (yellow card) 64'; Mariappa (yellow card) 65'	Stadium: Falmer Stadium; Attendance: 30,443; Referee: Kevin Friend

23 February 2020 27	Manchester United	3–0	Watford	Trafford
14:00 GMT	Fernandes 42' (pen.); Martial 58'; Greenwood 75'	Report	Cathcart (yellow card) 67'	Stadium: Old Trafford; Attendance: 73,347; Referee: Martin Atkinson

29 February 2020 28	Watford	3–0	Liverpool	Watford
17:30 GMT	Sarr 54', 60'; Deeney 72'	Report		Stadium: Vicarage Road; Attendance: 21,634; Referee: Michael Oliver

7 March 2020 29	Crystal Palace	1–0	Watford	Selhurst
15:00 GMT	Ayew 28', (yellow card) 90+4'; Zaha (yellow card) 41'; Kouyaté (yellow card) 50'; Benteke (yellow card) 59'	Report	Kiko (yellow card) 31'; Capoue (yellow card) 50'; Doucouré (yellow card) 52'; Pussetto (yellow card) 85'	Stadium: Selhurst Park; Attendance: 25,461; Referee: Anthony Taylor

20 June 2020 30	Watford	1–1	Leicester City	Watford
12:30 BST	Dawson 90+3'	Report	Tielemans (yellow card) 40'; Chilwell 90'	Stadium: Vicarage Road; Attendance: 0 Referee: Craig Pawson
Note: The match was postponed on 13 March due to concerns over the coronavirus pandemic. It was rescheduled to 20 June.

25 June 2020 31	Burnley	1–0	Watford	Burnley
18:00 BST	McNeil (yellow card) 71'; Rodriguez 73'	Report		Stadium: Turf Moor; Attendance: 0 Referee: Mike Dean
Note: The match was postponed on 19 March due to concerns over the coronavirus pandemic, and rescheduled to 25 June.

28 June 2020 32	Watford	1–3	Southampton	Watford
16:30 BST	Dawson (yellow card) 32'; Bednarek 79' (o.g.); Doucouré (yellow card) 90+5'; Cathcart (yellow card) 90+6'	Report	Ings 16', 70'; Ward-Prowse 82'	Stadium: Vicarage Road; Attendance: 0 Referee: Michael Oliver
Note: The match was postponed on 19 March due to concerns over the coronavirus pandemic, and rescheduled to 28 June.

4 July 2020 33	Chelsea	3–0	Watford	London
20:00 BST	Giroud 28'; Willian 43' (pen.); Barkley 90+2'	Report	Capoue (yellow card) 21'; Mariappa (yellow card) 49'	Stadium: Stamford Bridge; Attendance: 0 Referee: Kevin Friend
Note: The match was postponed on 19 March due to concerns over the coronavirus pandemic, and rescheduled to 4 July.

7 July 2020 34	Watford	2–1	Norwich City	Watford
18:00 BST	Dawson 10'; Hughes (yellow card) 23'; Welbeck 55'; Cleverley (yellow card) 90+5'	Report	Buendía 4', (yellow card) 90+4'; Lewis (yellow card) 9'; Tettey (yellow card) 11'; Godfrey (yellow card) 88'	Stadium: Vicarage Road; Attendance: 0 Referee: Anthony Taylor
Note: The match was postponed on 3 April due to concerns over the coronavirus pandemic, and rescheduled to 7 July.

11 July 2020 35	Watford	2–1	Newcastle United	Watford
12:30 BST	Deeney 52' (pen.), 82' (pen.); Hughes (yellow card) 90'	Report	Gayle 23'; Lascelles (yellow card) 45+2'; Manquillo (yellow card) 63'; Fernández (yellow card) 77'; Schär (yellow card) 84'	Stadium: Vicarage Road; Attendance: 0 Referee: Craig Pawson
Note: The match was postponed on 3 April due to concerns over the coronavirus pandemic, and rescheduled to 11 July.

17 July 2020 36	West Ham United	3–1	Watford	Stratford
20:00 BST	Antonio 6'; Souček 10'; Rice 36'	Report	Cleverley (yellow card) 9'; Hughes (yellow card) 35'; Deeney 49'	Stadium: London Stadium; Attendance: 0 Referee: Martin Atkinson
Note: The match was postponed on 3 April due to concerns over the coronavirus pandemic, and rescheduled to 17 July.

21 July 2020 37	Watford	0–4	Manchester City	Watford
18:00 BST	Mariappa (yellow card) 80'; Hughes (yellow card) 90+1'	Report	Sterling 31', 40'; Foden 63'; Laporte 66'	Stadium: Vicarage Road; Attendance: 0 Referee: Michael Oliver
Note: The match was postponed on 3 April due to concerns over the coronavirus pandemic, and rescheduled to 21 July.

26 July 2020 38	Arsenal	3–2	Watford	Holloway
16:00 BST	Aubameyang 5' (pen.), 33'; Tierney 24'; Xhaka (yellow card) 45'; Holding (yellow card) 72'; Martínez (yellow card) 74'	Report	Pereyra (yellow card) 35'; Deeney 43' (pen.); Hughes (yellow card) 45+5'; Dawson (yellow card) 51'; Welbeck 66'	Stadium: Emirates Stadium; Attendance: 0 Referee: Mike Dean
Note: The match was postponed on 3 April due to concerns over the coronavirus pandemic, and rescheduled to 26 July.

=== FA Cup ===
The third round draw was made live on BBC Two from Etihad Stadium, Micah Richards and Tony Adams conducted the draw.

4 January 2020 Third round	Watford	3–3	Tranmere Rovers	Watford
15:00 GMT	Dele-Bashiru 12'; Chalobah 14'; Pereyra 34'	Report	Jennings 65'; Monthé 78'; Mullin 87' (pen.)	Stadium: Vicarage Road; Attendance: 14,373; Referee: Graham Scott

14 January 2020 Third round replay	Tranmere Rovers	v	Watford	Birkenhead
19:45 GMT		Report		Stadium: Prenton Park
Note: The fixture was postponed due to a waterlogged pitch.

23 January 2020 Third round replay	Tranmere Rovers	2–1 (a.e.t.)	Watford	Birkenhead
19:45 GMT	Monthé 36'; Jennings (yellow card) 55', (goal) 104'	Report	Hinds 68'	Stadium: Prenton Park; Attendance: 10,039; Referee: Tony Harrington

=== EFL Cup ===
The second round draw was made on 13 August 2019 following the conclusion of all but one first-round matches. The third round draw was confirmed on 28 August 2019, live on Sky Sports. The draw for the fourth round was made on 25 September 2019.

27 August 2019 Second round	Watford	3–0	Coventry City	Watford
19:45 BST	Sarr 37'; Janmaat 56'; Peñaranda 69'	Report	Dabo (yellow card) 75'	Stadium: Vicarage Road; Attendance: 12,257; Referee: Gavin Ward

24 September 2019 Third round	Watford	2–1	Swansea City	Watford
19:45 BST	Welbeck 28'; Pereyra 79' (yellow card) 90+1'	Report	Surridge 34'; Grimes (yellow card) 90+3'	Stadium: Vicarage Road; Attendance: 8,903; Referee: Darren Bond

29 October 2019 Fourth round	Everton	2–0	Watford	Walton
19:45 GMT	Holgate 72'; Richarlison 90+3'	Report	Doucouré (yellow card) 68'; Mariappa (yellow card) 90'	Stadium: Goodison Park; Attendance: 34,979; Referee: Simon Hooper

== Appearances and goals ==
No.	Pos	Nat	Player	Total		Premier League		FA Cup		League Cup	
No.	Pos	Nat	Player	Apps	Goals	Apps	Goals	Apps	Goals	Apps	Goals
Goalkeepers
1	GK	(Brazil) BRA	Heurelho Gomes	3	0	0	0	0	0	3	0
26	GK	(England) ENG	Ben Foster	38	0	38	0	0	0	0	0
35	GK	(Austria) AUT	Daniel Bachmann	2	0	0	0	2	0	0	0
Defenders
2	DF	(Netherlands) NED	Daryl Janmaat	10	1	7+1	0	0	0	2	1
4	DF	(England) ENG	Craig Dawson	29	2	26+3	2	0	0	0	0
6	DF	(Jamaica) JAM	Adrian Mariappa	23	0	15+5	0	1	0	2	0
11	DF	(Italy) ITA	Adam Masina	28	1	20+6	1	1	0	1	0
15	DF	(Northern Ireland) NIR	Craig Cathcart	30	0	28+1	0	0	0	1	0
21	DF	(Spain) ESP	Kiko Femenía	29	0	26+2	0	0	0	1	0
25	DF	(Greece) GRE	José Holebas	15	0	11+3	0	1	0	0	0
27	DF	(Belgium) BEL	Christian Kabasele	31	0	26+1	0	1	0	2+1	0
41	DF	(England) ENG	Mason Barrett	2	0	0	0	1+1	0	0	0
51	DF	(England) ENG	Bayli Spencer-Adams	2	0	0	0	2	0	0	0
Midfielders
8	MF	(England) ENG	Tom Cleverley	19	1	11+7	1	0	0	0+1	0
14	MF	(England) ENG	Nathaniel Chalobah	26	1	10+12	0	1	1	3	0
16	MF	(France) FRA	Abdoulaye Doucouré	39	4	36+1	4	0	0	1+1	0
19	MF	(England) ENG	Will Hughes	31	1	27+3	1	0	0	1	0
20	MF	(Portugal) POR	Domingos Quina	9	0	0+4	0	2	0	3	0
24	MF	(Nigeria) NGR	Tom Dele-Bashiru	3	1	0	0	2	1	0+1	0
29	MF	(France) FRA	Étienne Capoue	30	0	30	0	0	0	0	0
37	MF	(Argentina) ARG	Roberto Pereyra	32	5	17+11	3	1	1	3	1
42	MF	(England) ENG	Callum Whelan	2	0	0	0	1+1	0	0	0
44	MF	(England) ENG	Joseph Hungbo	1	0	0	0	1	0	0	0
46	MF	(England) ENG	Henry Wise	1	0	0	0	0+1	0	0	0
58	MF	(England) ENG	Jayden Bennetts	1	0	0	0	0+1	0	0	0
Forwards
7	FW	(Spain) ESP	Gerard Deulofeu	30	4	25+3	4	0	0	0+2	0
9	FW	(England) ENG	Troy Deeney	27	10	26+1	10	0	0	0	0
10	FW	(England) ENG	Danny Welbeck	20	3	8+10	2	0	0	2	1
17	FW	(Brazil) BRA	João Pedro	5	0	0+3	0	1+1	0	0	0
18	FW	(England) ENG	Andre Gray	27	2	7+16	2	2	0	2	0
22	FW	(Nigeria) NGR	Isaac Success	7	0	0+5	0	1	0	1	0
23	FW	(Senegal) SEN	Ismaïla Sarr	30	6	22+6	5	0	0	1+1	1
33	FW	(Argentina) ARG	Ignacio Pussetto	7	0	0+7	0	0	0	0	0
40	FW	(England) ENG	Sam Dalby	1	0	0	0	0+1	0	0	0
53	FW	(England) ENG	Kaylen Hinds	1	0	0	0	0+1	0	0	0
Players transferred out during the season
5	DF	(Austria) AUT	Sebastian Prödl	3	0	1	0	0	0	2	0
17	FW	(Venezuela) VEN	Adalberto Peñaranda	1	1	0	0	0	0	0+1	1
36	DF	(France) FRA	Dimitri Foulquier	5	0	1+2	0	0	0	2	0

Last updated: 26 July 2020
Source: Competitions
