= Henry Wise (footballer) =

English footballer

Personal information
- Full name: Henry Dennis Paul Wise
- Date of birth: 1 January 2000 (age 26)
- Place of birth: Kensington, England
- Height: 5 ft 9 in (1.74 m)
- Position: Midfielder

Youth career
- –2014: Queens Park Rangers
- 2014–2016: Arsenal
- 2016–2019: Derby County

Senior career*
Years	Team	Apps	(Gls)
2019–2022	Watford	0	(0)
2022–2023	New York Red Bulls II	14	(0)
- * Club domestic league appearances and goals as of 14:56, 27 October 2023 (UTC)

Henry Dennis Paul Wise (born 1 January 2000) is an English professional footballer who plays as a midfielder.

== Career ==
=== Early career ===
Born in Kensington, Wise was spotted by boyhood club Queens Park Rangers and joined the clubs youth academy. After a few years with Queens Park Rangers he signed with Arsenal joining the Gunners' Hale End academy. In 2016 he joined Derby County. Wise appeared in 24 matches with Derby County's U-18's in the U18 Premier League, where he scored two goals.

In November 2018, he had a trial at Queens Park Rangers. In March 2019, Wise departed Derby "by mutual agreement".

=== Watford ===
In July 2019, Wise joined Watford's under-23 side on a one-year deal. On 4 November 2019, Wise opened the scoring for Watford under-23 in a 3-0 victory over Ipswich Town's under-23 side in a Professional Development League Two clash at Clarence Park. In summer 2020, he signed a new one-year deal at the club. On 23 January 2020, Wise made his first team debut for Watford in a 2–1 FA Cup third round replay defeat against Tranmere Rovers. In summer 2020, he signed a new one-year deal at the club. He was released by Watford at the end of the 2021–22 season.

=== New York Red Bulls II ===
On 11 August 2022, Wise moved to the United States, signing with USL Championship side New York Red Bulls II. On 22 September 22, Wise made his debut for New York appearing as a starter in a 0-0 draw with Detroit City FC. He was released by New York Red Bulls at the end of the 2023 MLS Next Pro season.

== Personal life ==
He is the son of former player Dennis Wise.

== Career statistics ==
As of match played 23 January 2020.

Appearances and goals by club, season and competition
Club	Season	League			FA Cup		League Cup		Other		Total	
Club	Season	Division	Apps	Goals	Apps	Goals	Apps	Goals	Apps	Goals	Apps	Goals
Watford	2019–20	Premier League	0	0	1	0	0	0	0	0	1	0
New York Red Bulls II	2022	USL Championship	4	0	0	0	0	0	0	0	4	0
Career total			4	0	1	0	0	0	0	0	5	0
