= Kaylen Hinds =

English footballer (born 1998)

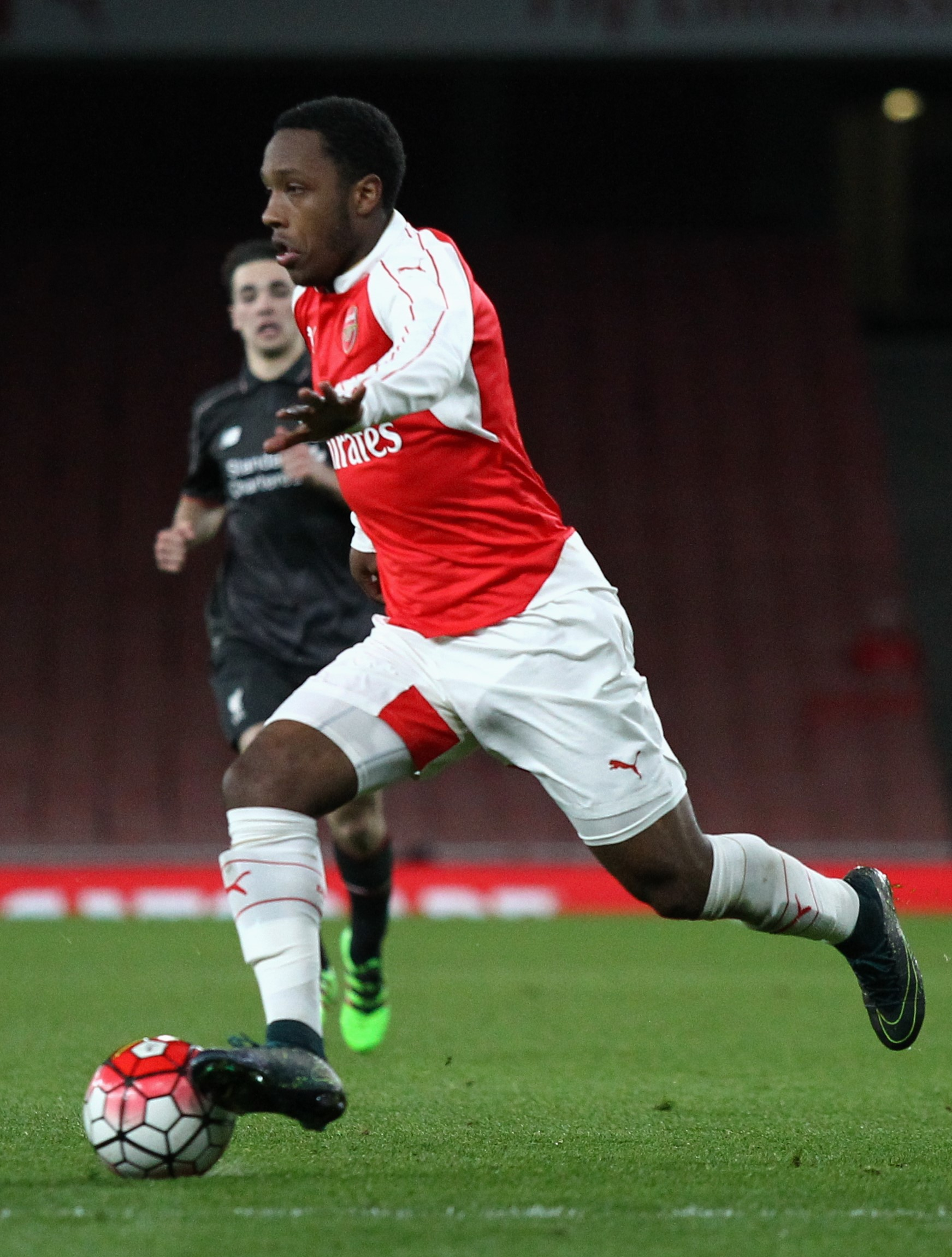
- Hinds playing for Arsenal U18s in 2016

Personal information
- Full name: Kaylen Miles Hinds
- Date of birth: 28 January 1998 (age 28)
- Place of birth: Brent, England
- Height: 5 ft 11 in (1.80 m)
- Position: Striker

Team information
- Current team: Hayes & Yeading United

Youth career
- –2016: Arsenal

Senior career*
Years	Team	Apps	(Gls)
2016–2017	Arsenal	0	(0)
2017	→ Stevenage (loan)	13	(0)
2017–2018	VfL Wolfsburg	1	(0)
2018	→ Greuther Fürth II (loan)	1	(0)
2019–2020	Watford	0	(0)
2021	Aldershot Town	7	(0)
2021–2022	Welling United	4	(0)
2022	Hayes & Yeading United	1	(0)
2022–2023	Haringey Borough	15	(3)
2023–2025	Hemel Hempstead Town	19	(3)
2024–2025	→ Hayes & Yeading United (loan)	32	(15)
2025–	Hayes & Yeading United	34	(8)

International career^{‡}
2013–2014	England U16	7	(5)
2014–2015	England U17	7	(5)
2015	England U18	1	(0)
2017	England U20	2	(0)
- * Club domestic league appearances and goals as of 20:13, 27 May 2026 (UTC) ‡ National team caps and goals as of 10:19, 8 October 2017 (UTC)

Kaylen Miles Hinds (born 28 January 1998) is an English professional footballer who plays as a striker for Hayes & Yeading United.

== Early and personal life ==
He was born in Brent and grew up in Islington. He is of Jamaican descent.

== Club career ==
Hinds joined Premier League side Arsenal from the youth system of Leyton Orient as an under-14 in 2012. He signed a professional contract of undisclosed length in February 2015 and another prior to joining Stevenage on loan in January 2017.

On 8 July 2017, Hinds joined Bundesliga side VfL Wolfsburg on a three-year deal.

On 31 January 2018, Hinds joined Regionalliga Bayern side SpVgg Greuther Fürth II, the second team of 2. Bundesliga side SpVgg Greuther Fürth, on loan until the end of the 2017–18 season.

On 6 September 2018, Wolfsburg terminated Hinds's contract after an unauthorised week-long absence, with club managing director Jörg Schmadtke stating that "he has not fulfilled his contractual obligations despite repeated requests. We do not tolerate such behaviour."

In August 2019, Hinds signed for Premier League side Watford on a one-year contract with the club holding the option of a one-year extension. On 23 January 2020, he made his debut for Watford in a 2–1 FA Cup third round replay defeat away at Tranmere Rovers. Coming on as half-time substitute for Tom Dele-Bashiru, Hinds scored in the 68th minute to level the tie before Tranmere scored an extra-time winner. He was released by Watford in June 2020.

On 2 April 2021 he signed for National League side Aldershot Town, making his debut off of the bench that day in a 2–1 defeat to Stockport County. In August 2021, he signed for National League South side Welling United, before dropping down a division in January 2022 to sign for Southern League Premier Division South club Hayes & Yeading United.

In January 2023, he returned to the National League South with Hemel Hempstead Town following a spell with Haringey Borough.

After playing on loan for Hayes & Yeading, he signed permanently in 2025.

== International career ==
Hinds has represented England at youth international levels, including under-17, where he was part of the 2015 FIFA U-17 World Cup squad. He has also played at under-18 level.

== Career statistics ==
As of match played 22 May 2021

Appearances and goals by club, season and competition
Club	Season	League			National Cup		League Cup		Other		Total	
Club	Season	Division	Apps	Goals	Apps	Goals	Apps	Goals	Apps	Goals	Apps	Goals
Arsenal	2016–17	Premier League	0	0	0	0	0	0	0	0	0	0
Stevenage (loan)	2016–17	League Two	13	0	0	0	0	0	0	0	13	0
VfL Wolfsburg	2017–18	Bundesliga	1	0	1	0	—		—		2	0
Greuther Fürth II (loan)	2017–18	Regionalliga	1	0	0	0	—		—		1	0
Watford	2019–20	Premier League	0	0	1	1	0	0	0	0	1	1
Aldershot Town	2020–21	National League	7	0	0	0	—		0	0	7	0
Career total			22	0	2	1	0	0	0	0	24	1
