= Jayden Bennetts =

English footballer (born 2001)

Personal information
- Full name: Jayden Ugonna Elias Mbaeri Bennetts
- Date of birth: 26 June 2001 (age 25)
- Place of birth: Barnet, England
- Height: 1.72 m (5 ft 8 in)
- Position: Midfielder

Team information
- Current team: Chesham United
- Number: 27

Youth career
- –2020: Watford

Senior career*
Years	Team	Apps	(Gls)
2019–2020	Watford	0	(0)
2020–2021	SC Paderborn II	0	(0)
2021–2022	VfB Stuttgart II	16	(1)
2022–2024	Phönix Lübeck	35	(6)
2023–2024	Phönix Lübeck II	3	(5)
2024–2025	FC Düren	7	(0)
2025–	Chesham United	31	(10)
- * Club domestic league appearances and goals as of 08:22, 29 May 2026 (UTC)

Jayden Ugonna Elias Mbaeri Bennetts (born 26 June 2001) is an English professional footballer who plays as a midfielder for National League South club Chesham United.

== Career ==
Bennetts came through the academy system at Watford and signed a one-year professional contract at the conclusion of his scholarship in May 2019.

On 23 January 2020, Bennetts made his debut for Watford in a 2–1 FA Cup third round replay defeat away at Tranmere Rovers, coming on as an extra-time substitute for Joseph Hungbo. He left the club in June 2020.

In November 2020, Bennetts joined the reserve team of Paderborn until the end of the season.

On 12 August 2021, he moved to VfB Stuttgart II. He was released by the club in May 2022.

In September 2022, Bennetts joined Regionalliga Nord side Phönix Lübeck.

In July 2024, Bennetts joined Regionalliga West side FC Düren.

In October 2025, Bennetts returned to England, joining National League South club Chesham United.

== Personal life ==
Bennetts was born in England to a Nigerian father and German mother. Bennetts' older brother Keanan is also a professional footballer.

== Career statistics ==
As of match played 23 January 2020.

Appearances and goals by club, season and competition
Club	Season	League			FA Cup		League Cup		Other		Total	
Club	Season	Division	Apps	Goals	Apps	Goals	Apps	Goals	Apps	Goals	Apps	Goals
Watford	2019–20	Premier League	0	0	1	0	0	0	0	0	1	0
Career total			0	0	1	0	0	0	0	0	1	0
