= Bayli Spencer-Adams =

Guyanese footballer

Personal information
- Full name: Bayli Alexander Spencer-Adams
- Date of birth: 26 June 2001 (age 25)
- Place of birth: Waltham Forest, England
- Height: 1.90 m (6 ft 3 in)
- Position: Defender

Team information
- Current team: Cray Wanderers
- Number: 18

Youth career
- West Ham United
- Tottenham Hotspur
- –2019: Arsenal

Senior career*
| Years | Team | Apps | (Gls) |
| 2019–2021 | Watford | 0 | (0) |
| 2020–2021 | → Dover Athletic (loan) | 8 | (0) |
| 2021–2023 | Leicester City | 0 | (0) |
| 2026– | Cray Wanderers | 5 | (0) |

International career^{‡}
| 2021– | Guyana | 4 | (0) |
- * Club domestic league appearances and goals as of 17:15, 8 November 2026 (UTC) ‡ National team caps and goals as of 10:00, 29 March 2023 (UTC)

Bayli Alexander Spencer-Adams (born 26 June 2001) is a semi-professional footballer who plays as a defender for Isthmian League Premier Division club Cray Wanderers. Born in England, he represents the Guyana national team.

== Career ==
=== Watford ===
On 4 January 2020, Spencer-Adams made his professional debut for Watford in a 3–3 FA Cup third round draw against Tranmere Rovers.

==== Dover Athletic (loan) ====
On 16 October 2020, Spencer-Adams joined National League side Dover Athletic on loan until 31 January 2021. He made his debut the following day, starting and playing the entirety of a 2–0 defeat at Torquay United. On 25 January, Spencer-Adams returned to Watford having made 10 appearances in all competitions for the National League's bottom side.

At the end of the 2020–21 season, Spencer-Adams was released by Watford.

=== Leicester City ===
On 15 October 2021, Spencer-Adams tweeted to say he had signed for Leicester City. In June 2023, Spencer-Adams was released by the club.

=== Cray Wanderers ===
On 19 August 2026, Spencer-Adams returned to football, signing for Cray Wanderers.

== International career ==
Born in the London Borough of Waltham Forest, Spencer-Adams qualifies to play for Guyana through his father. In March 2021, he was named in the preliminary Guyana squad for their World Cup qualifiers later that month. He made his debut on 25 March 2021 in a World Cup qualifier against Trinidad and Tobago.

== Career statistics ==
=== Club ===
As of match played 23 January 2021

Appearances and goals by club, season and competition
| Club | Season | League | | | FA Cup | | League Cup | | Other | | Total | |
| Club | Season | Division | Apps | Goals | Apps | Goals | Apps | Goals | Apps | Goals | Apps | Goals |
|---|---|---|---|---|---|---|---|---|---|---|---|---|
| Watford | 2019–20 | Premier League | 0 | 0 | 2 | 0 | 0 | 0 | — | | 2 | 0 |
| Watford | 2020–21 | Championship | 0 | 0 | 0 | 0 | 0 | 0 | — | | 0 | 0 |
| Watford | Total | | 0 | 0 | 2 | 0 | 0 | 0 | 0 | 0 | 2 | 0 |
| Dover Athletic (loan) | 2020–21 | National League | 8 | 0 | 1 | 0 | — | | 1 (Note: Appearance(s) in FA Trophy) | 0 | 10 | 0 |
| Career total | | | 8 | 0 | 3 | 0 | 0 | 0 | 1 | 0 | 12 | 0 |

=== International ===
As of match played 29 March 2023

Appearances and goals by national team and year
| National team | Year | Apps | Goals |
|---|---|---|---|
| Guyana | 2021 | 2 | 0 |
| Guyana | 2023 | 2 | 0 |
| Total | | 4 | 0 |
