= 2025–26 Pafos FC season =

Pafos
2025–26 season
- Owner: Pavel Gognidze
- Manager: Juan Carlos Carcedo (Until 5 January); Sofyane Cherfa (Caretaker) (5-9 January); Albert Celades (9 January-28 April); Ricardo Sá Pinto (From 28 April)
- Stadium: Stelios Kyriakides Stadium
- Cypriot First Division: 4th
- Cypriot Cup: Winners
- Cypriot Super Cup: Runners-up
- UEFA Champions League: League phase
- Top goalscorer: League: João Correia (10); All: Anderson Silva (14)
- Highest home attendance: 8,422 (vs Red Star Belgrade, 26 August 2025, UEFA Champions League)
- Lowest home attendance: 4,557 (vs Maccabi Tel Aviv, 22 July 2025, UEFA Champions League)
Home colours	Away colours

The 2025–26 season was Pafos's 12th year in existence, and ninth season in the Cypriot First Division. Pafos are defending league champions, having won it for the first time the previous season, and will also enter both the Cypriot Cup and the Cypriot Super Cup, and the UEFA Champions League.

== Season review ==
On 23 June, Pafos announced the permanent signing of Anderson Silva from Alanyaspor, on a contract until June 2028.

On 27 June, Pafos announced the permanent signing of Jajá from Athletico Paranaense, on a contract until June 2028.

On 4 July, Pafos announced the loan signing of Bruno Langa from UD Almería for the season.

On 9 July, Pafos announced that they had extended their contract with Christos Evzonas until the summer of 2027.

On 14 July, Pafos announced that Ivica Ivušić had left the club to sign for Hajduk Split.

On 15 July, Pafos announced the signing of Mons Bassouamina from Clermont on a contract until the summer of 2027.

On 18 July, Pafos announced the season-long loan signing of Pedrão from Cruzeiro.

On 19 July, Pafos announced the season-long loan signing of Alexandre Brito from Sporting CP.

On 23 July, Pafos announced the signing of Jay Gorter from AFC Ajax on a contract until the summer of 2028.

On 3 August, Pafos announced the signing of David Luiz, after he had left Fortaleza, on a contract until the summer of 2027.

On 2 September, Pafos announced the signing of Landry Dimata from Samsunspor.

On 3 September, Pafos announced the signing of Wilmer Odefalk on loan from IF Brommapojkarna.

On 8 September, Pafos announced the signing of Ognjen Mimović on loan from Fenerbahçe.

On 9 September, Pafos announced that Muamer Tanković had left the club, with AC Omonia announcing his signing the same day.

On 2 October, Pafos announced the signing of Axel Guessand, who had been released by Kristiansund earlier in the summer.

On 2 November, Pafos announced that they had extended their contract with João Correia until the summer of 2028.

On 3 November, Pafos announced that they had extended their contract with Ivan Šunjić until the summer of 2027.

On 5 January, Pafos announced that head coach Juan Carlos Carcedo had bought out his contract, and the contracts of Sergio Domínguez Cobo and Sebastián Corona, and had left the club for a new project. Four days later, on 9 January 2026, Pafos announced the appointment of Albert Celades as their new head coach on a contract until 2027.

On 30 January, Pafos announced that their loan agreement with Bruno Langa had been ended early and that he'd returned to Almería.

On 31 January, Pafos announced the signing of Nikolas Ioannou from Sampdoria, on a contract until June 2028, and the loan signings of Dani Silva from Midtjylland and Lelê from Fluminense both on contracts until the end of the season.

On 28 April, Pafos announced that they had terminated their contract with Albert Celades, and that Ricardo Sá Pinto had been appointed as the club's new head coach.

== Squad ==
As of match played 29 May 2026

No.	Name	Nationality	Position	Date of birth (age)	Signed from	Signed in	Contract ends	Apps.	Goals
Goalkeepers
1	Jay Gorter	(Netherlands)	GK	30 May 2003 (aged 22)	AFC Ajax	2025	2028	21	0
82	Petros Petrou	(Cyprus)	GK	10 August 2006 (aged 19)	Academy	2025		0	0
93	Neofytos Michail	(Cyprus)	GK	16 December 1993 (aged 32)	Anorthosis Famagusta	2024		44	0
99	Athanasios Papadoudis	(Greece)	GK	6 September 2003 (aged 22)	Olympiacos	2024		6	0
Defenders
2	Kostas Pileas	(Cyprus)	DF	11 December 1998 (aged 27)	Panserraikos	2024		66	1
4	David Luiz	(Brazil)	DF	22 April 1987 (aged 39)	Unattached	2025	2027	39	6
5	David Goldar	(Spain)	DF	15 September 1994 (aged 31)	Burgos	2023		111	12
14	Nikolas Ioannou	(Cyprus)	DF	10 November 1995 (aged 30)	Sampdoria	2026	2028	20	2
19	Axel Guessand	(France)	DF	6 November 2004 (aged 21)	Unattached	2025		12	0
21	Ognjen Mimović	(Serbia)	DF	17 August 2004 (aged 21)	on loan from Fenerbahçe	2025	2026	28	0
23	Derrick Luckassen (Note: Derrick Luckassen was born in Netherlands, but qualified to represent Ghana, making his debut in March 2026.)	(Ghana)	DF	3 July 1995 (aged 30)	Maccabi Tel Aviv	2024		92	7
35	Pedrão	(Brazil)	DF	6 January 2004 (aged 22)	on loan from Cruzeiro	2025	2026	2	0
77	João Correia (Note: João Correia was born in Portugal, but qualified to represent Cape Verde, making his debut in 2022.)	(Cape Verde)	DF	5 September 1996 (aged 29)	Chaves	2024	2028	85	22
Midfielders
8	Domingos Quina (Note: Domingos Quina was born in Guinea-Bissau, but qualified to represent Portugal, representing them at youth level between 2015 and 2019.)	(Portugal)	MF	18 November 1999 (aged 26)	Udinese	2024		81	9
12	Ken Sema	(Sweden)	MF	30 September 1993 (aged 32)	Unattached	2024		59	0
20	Wilmer Odefalk	(Sweden)	MF	21 November 2004 (aged 21)	on loan from IF Brommapojkarna	2025	2026	14	1
26	Ivan Šunjić	(Bosnia and Herzegovina)	MF	9 October 1996 (aged 29)	Unattached	2024	2027	97	7
30	Vlad Dragomir	(Romania)	MF	24 April 1999 (aged 27)	Virtus Entella	2021		205	23
50	Alexandre Brito	(Portugal)	MF	19 July 2005 (aged 20)	on loan from Sporting CP	2025	2026	12	2
80	Dani Silva	(Portugal)	MF	11 April 2000 (aged 26)	on loan from Midtjylland	2026	2026	18	0
81	George Kolotas	(Cyprus)	MF	15 March 2006 (aged 20)	Academy	2024		0	0
88	Pêpê	(Portugal)	MF	20 May 1997 (aged 29)	Olympiacos	2024		139	10
Forwards
7	Bruno Felipe	(Brazil)	FW	26 May 1994 (aged 32)	Omonia	2023	2027	150	12
9	Mons Bassouamina (Note: Mons Bassouamina was born in France, but qualified to represent Congo, making his debut in 2022.)	(Republic of the Congo)	FW	28 May 1998 (aged 28)	Clermont	2025	2027	26	3
11	Jajá	(Brazil)	FW	15 April 2001 (aged 25)	Athletico Paranaense	2024	2028	114	20
17	Mislav Oršić	(Croatia)	FW	29 December 1992 (aged 33)	Trabzonspor	2025		68	8
18	Lelê	(Brazil)	FW	1 October 1997 (aged 28)	on loan from Fluminense	2026	2026	14	5
33	Anderson Silva	(Brazil)	FW	21 November 1997 (aged 28)	Alanyaspor	2025	2028	108	31
42	Georgios Michael	(Cyprus)	FW	24 November 2008 (aged 17)	Academy	2026		2	0
87	Pedro Caldieraro	(Brazil)	FW	16 August 2005 (aged 20)	Hercílio Luz	2023		1	0
Out on loan
8	Mamadou Kané	(Guinea)	MF	22 January 1997 (aged 29)	Olympiacos	2023	2026	55	3
10	Landry Dimata (Note: Landry Dimata was born in DR Congo, but qualified to represent Belgium, representing them at youth level between 2013 and 2019.)	(Belgium)	FW	1 September 1997 (aged 28)	Samsunspor	2025		22	1
80	Christos Evzonas	(Cyprus)	MF	21 April 2005 (aged 21)	Academy	2024	2027	0	0
Left during the season
22	Muamer Tanković	(Sweden)	FW	22 February 1995 (aged 31)	AEK Athens	2022		134	34
24	Onni Valakari (Note: Onni Valakari was born in Scotland, but qualified to represent Finland, making his debut for them in 2020.)	(Finland)	MF	18 August 1999 (aged 26)	Tromsø	2020	2026	158	46
25	Moustapha Name	(Senegal)	MF	5 May 1995 (aged 31)	Paris FC	2022		94	7
25	Bruno Langa	(Mozambique)	DF	31 October 1997 (aged 28)	on loan from UD Almería	2025	2026	17	0
70	Marios Ilia	(Cyprus)	FW	19 May 1996 (aged 30)	Ethnikos Achna	2024		14	0
84	Kevin Nhaga	(Portugal)	FW	24 July 2005 (aged 20)	Boavista	2023		1	0

== Transfers ==
=== In ===
Date	Position	Nationality	Name	From	Fee	Ref.
23 June 2025	FW	(Brazil)	Anderson Silva	Alanyaspor	Undisclosed	
27 June 2025	FW	(Brazil)	Jajá	Athletico Paranaense	Undisclosed	
15 July 2025	FW	(Republic of the Congo)	Mons Bassouamina	Clermont	Undisclosed	
13 July 2025	GK	(Netherlands)	Jay Gorter	AFC Ajax	Undisclosed	
3 August 2025	DF	(Brazil)	David Luiz	Unattached	Free	
2 September 2025	FW	(Belgium)	Landry Dimata	Samsunspor	Undisclosed	
2 October 2025	DF	(France)	Axel Guessand	Unattached	Free	
31 January 2026	DF	(Cyprus)	Nikolas Ioannou	Sampdoria	Undisclosed	

=== Loans in ===
Start date	Position	Nationality	Name	From	End date	Ref.
4 July 2025	DF	(Mozambique)	Bruno Langa	UD Almería	30 January 2026	
18 July 2025	DF	(Brazil)	Pedrão	Cruzeiro	End of season	
19 July 2025	MF	(Portugal)	Alexandre Brito	Sporting CP	End of season	
3 September 2025	MF	(Sweden)	Wilmer Odefalk	IF Brommapojkarna	End of season	
8 September 2025	DF	(Serbia)	Ognjen Mimović	Fenerbahçe	End of season	
31 January 2026	MF	(Portugal)	Dani Silva	Midtjylland	End of season	
31 January 2026	FW	(Brazil)	Lelê	Fluminense	End of season	

=== Out ===
Date	Position	Nationality	Name	To	Fee	Ref.
20 June 2025	FW	(Ghana)	Patrick Twumasi	Jeonbuk Hyundai Motors	Undisclosed	
3 July 2025	MF	(Portugal)	Pedro Pelágio	Chaves	Undisclosed	
11 July 2025	GK	(Croatia)	Ivica Ivušić	Hajduk Split	Undisclosed	
15 July 2025	DF	(Russia)	Khetag Kochiyev	Chelyabinsk	Undisclosed	
3 August 2025	FW	(Portugal)	Kevin Nhaga	Sportist Svoge	Undisclosed	
9 September 2025	FW	(Sweden)	Muamer Tanković	AC Omonia	Undisclosed	
24 September 2025	MF	(Senegal)	Moustapha Name	United FC	Undisclosed	
1 January 2026	MF	(Finland)	Onni Valakari	San Diego FC	Undisclosed	

=== Loans out ===
Start date	Position	Nationality	Name	To	End date	Ref.
13 January 2025	MF	(Finland)	Onni Valakari	San Diego FC	31 December 2025	
11 July 2025	MF	(Cyprus)	Christos Evzonas	Olympiakos Nicosia	30 June 2026	
9 September 2025	MF	(Guinea)	Mamadou Kané	Ethnikos Achna	30 June 2026	
22 February 2026	FW	(Belgium)	Landry Dimata	Chongqing Tonglianglong	31 December 2026	

=== Released ===
Date	Position	Nationality	Name	Joined	Date	Ref
29 August 2025	FW	(Cyprus)	Marios Ilia	Anorthosis Famagusta	29 August 2025	
4 June 2026	GK	(Greece)	Athanasios Papadoudis	Riga	22 June 2026	
4 June 2026	DF	(Cyprus)	Kostas Pileas	AEK Larnaca	8 June 2026	
9 June 2026	FW	(Croatia)	Mislav Oršić	Dinamo Zagreb	9 June 2026	
30 June 2026	MF	(Guinea)	Mamadou Kané	Araz-Naxçıvan	23 July 2026	

== Friendlies ==
5 July 2025	Wimbledon	2–2	Pafos	Marbella, Spain
12:30 EEST (UTC+3)	Kelly 25'; Stevens 90+1'	Report	Luckassen 1'; Bruno 45+1'	Stadium: Marbella Football Centre

11 July 2025	Leyton Orient	0–1	Pafos	Marbella, Spain
12:00 EEST (UTC+3)		Report	Bruno	Stadium: Banus Football Centre

13 July 2025	Orlando Pirates	1–1	Pafos	Marbella, Spain
12:00 EEST (UTC+3)	Mofokeng 24'	Report	Correia 7'	Stadium: Marbella Football Centre

15 July 2025	Real Valladolid	2–3	Pafos	Madrid, Spain
11:00 EEST (UTC+3)		Report		Stadium: Las Rozas Soccer City

== Competitions ==
=== Overview ===
Competition	First match	Last match	Starting round	Final position	Record							
Competition	First match	Last match	Starting round	Final position	Pld	W	D	L	GF	GA	GD	Win %
Cypriot First Division	31 August 2025	22 May 2026	Matchday 2	4th	36	18	8	10	66	38	+28	50.00
Cypriot Cup	7 January 2026	29 May 2026	Second round	Winners	5	5	0	0	12	3	+9	100.00
Super Cup	30 October 2025	30 October 2025	Final	Runnersup	1	0	1	0	1	1	+0	0.00
UEFA Champions League	22 July 2025	28 January 2026	Second qualifying round	League Phase (26th)	14	6	5	3	16	13	+3	42.86
Total					56	29	14	13	95	55	+40	51.79

Last updated: 29 May 2026
Source: Competitions

=== Super Cup ===
30 October 2025	Pafos	1–1 (4–5 p)	AEK Larnaca	Strovolos
19:00 EET (UTC+2)	Quina 19' (yellow card) 56'; Luckassen (yellow card) 63'	Report	Angielski 28'; González (yellow card) 57'; Naoum (yellow card) 66'; Ioannou (yellow card) 85'	Stadium: GSP Stadium; Attendance: 2,133; Referee: Konstantinos Fellas
	Penalties
	Oršić (penalty scored); Jajá (penalty scored); Goldar (penalty scored); Pileas (penalty scored); Pêpê (penalty missed)		(penalty scored) Rohdén; (penalty scored) Rubio; (penalty scored) Jimmy; (penalty scored) Izquierdo; (penalty scored) Bajić

=== Cypriot First Division ===
==== Regular season ====
===== League table =====
Pos	Team	Pld	W	D	L	GF	GA	GD	Pts	Qualification or relegation
2	AEK Larnaca	26	16	5	5	49	22	+27	53	Qualification for the Championship round
3	Apollon Limassol	26	16	5	5	36	22	+14	53	Qualification for the Championship round
4	Pafos	26	16	3	7	53	24	+29	51	Qualification for the Championship round
5	APOEL	26	13	6	7	45	27	+18	45	Qualification for the Championship round
6	Aris Limassol	26	12	7	7	48	26	+22	43	Qualification for the Championship round

Source: Cyprus Football Association
Rules for classification: 1) Points; 2) Head-to-head points; 3) Head-to-head goal difference; 4) Head-to-head goals scored; 5) Head-to-head away goals scored (only if two teams); 6) Goal difference; 7) Goals scored; 8) Play-off (only if deciding championship round, relegation round or relegation).

===== Results summary =====
Overall								Home						Away					
Pld	W	D	L	GF	GA	GD	Pts	W	D	L	GF	GA	GD	W	D	L	GF	GA	GD
26	16	3	7	53	24	+29	51	9	1	3	30	9	+21	7	2	4	23	15	+8

Last updated: 14 March 2026.
Source: Results

===== Results by results =====
Matchday	2	3	3	4	5	6	7	8	9	10	11	12	13	14	16	17	18	19	20	15	21	22	23	24	25	26
Ground	A	H	A	H	H	A	H	A	H	A	H	A	H	A	H	H	A	H	A	H	A	A	H	A	H	A
Result	W	L	W	W	W	W	W	L	W	D	W	W	W	W	L	W	L	L	L	W	L	W	D	D	W	W
Position	5	9	7	3	4	1	1	3	2	3	1	1	1	1	2	2	3	3	5	3	4	4	4	4	4	3

Updated to match(es) played on 14 March 2026. Source: Results
A = Away; H = Home; W = Win; D = Draw; L = Loss; P = Postponed
Notes:
- ^{1} Matchday 1 postponed due to European participation.

===== Results =====
31 August 2025 2	APOEL	0–1	Pafos	Strovolos
20:00 EEST (UTC+3)	Brorsson (yellow card) 57'; Laifis (yellow card) 90+5'	Report	Luckassen 12' (yellow card) 49'; Sema (yellow card) 45+1'; Dragomir (yellow card) 45+3'; Šunjić (yellow card) 90+1'	Stadium: GSP Stadium; Attendance: 9,000; Referee: Panagiotis Chatzigeorgiou

13 September 2025 3	Pafos	0–1	Apollon Limassol	Paphos
18:00 EEST (UTC+3)	Luckassen (yellow card) 21' (yellow-red card) 48'; Luiz (yellow card) 76'; Pêpê (yellow card) 87'	Report	Marković (yellow card) 5'; Malekkidis (yellow card) 29'; Gaspar (yellow card) 38'; Weissbeck (yellow card) 49' (yellow-red card) 86' (goal) 56'; Vouros (yellow card) 62'; Thomas (yellow card) 76'; Youssef (yellow card) 83'; Špoljarić (yellow card) 87' (yellow-red card) 90+10'; Rodrigues (yellow card) 89'; Siikkis (yellow card) 90+9'	Stadium: Stelios Kyriakides Stadium; Attendance: 5,700; Referee: Ioannis Christodoulou

21 September 2025 4	Omonia Aradippou	0–2	Pafos	Larnaca
19:00 EEST (UTC+3)	Polykarpou (yellow card) 59'	Report	Pêpê (penalty missed) 27'; Jajá (yellow card) 45+1'; Šunjić 56'; Bruno 89' (yellow card) 90'	Stadium: Antonis Papadopoulos Stadium; Attendance: 2,000; Referee: Antoniou Menelaos

24 September 2025 1	Pafos	3–0	Enosis Neon Paralimni	Paphos
19:00 EEST (UTC+3)	Quina 33'; Oršić 86'; Pêpê 90' (pen.)	Report	Ioannou (yellow card) 28'; Krainz (yellow card) 39'; Kuster (yellow card) 90'	Stadium: Stelios Kyriakides Stadium; Attendance: 3,300; Referee: Marios Christoforou

27 September 2025 5	Pafos	2–1	Olympiakos Nicosia	Paphos
19:00 EEST (UTC+3)	Mimović (yellow card) 26'; Anderson 34'; Goldar (yellow card) 70'; Dimata 90+4'	Report	Konomis (yellow card) 12'; Gomes (yellow card) 41'; Pikis 71' (pen.) (yellow card) 77'; Džepar (yellow card) 85'	Stadium: Stelios Kyriakides Stadium; Attendance: 3,800; Referee: Asghar Tehrani

5 October 2025 6	AEK Larnaca	2–4	Pafos	Larnaca
19:00 EEST (UTC+3)	Rubio 2'; Ledes (yellow card) 69'; Ivanović 86'	Report	Quina 15', 42'; Šunjić (yellow card) 43'; Luckassen (yellow card) 47'; Goldar (yellow card) 62'; Anderson 80'; Dragomir 88'	Stadium: AEK Arena; Attendance: 4,500; Referee: Marios Christoforou

17 October 2025 7	Pafos	4–0	Ethnikos Achna	Paphos
19:00 EEST (UTC+3)	Luiz 18'; Quina 49'; Dragomir 86'; Anderson 89'	Report	Ofori (yellow card) 10'	Stadium: Stelios Kyriakides Stadium; Attendance: 3,465; Referee: Dimitris Solomou

27 October 2025 8	Omonia	2–1	Pafos	Strovolos
19:45 EET (UTC+2)	Tanković (yellow card) 45+3'; Marić (yellow card) 61'; Semedo 65', 90+5'	Report	Šunjić (yellow card) 2'; Dragomir 15'; Luiz (yellow card) 63'	Stadium: GSP Stadium; Attendance: 10,400; Referee: Panagiotis Chatzigeorgiou

2 November 2025 9	Pafos	1–0	AEL Limassol	Paphos
19:00 EET (UTC+2)	Dragomir 5' (yellow card) 82'; Anderson (yellow card) 78'	Report	Imanishimwe (yellow card) 71'	Stadium: Stelios Kyriakides Stadium; Attendance: 5,000; Referee: Antoniou Menelaos

9 November 2025 10	Anorthosis Famagusta	1–1	Pafos	Larnaca
19:00 EET (UTC+2)	Furtado (yellow card) 60'; Kiko 82' (yellow card) 90+7'; Sensi (yellow card) 90+8'	Report	Luiz 16'; Oršić (yellow card) 41'; Pileas (yellow card) 62'; Correia (yellow card) 83'; Sema (yellow card) 90+9'	Stadium: Antonis Papadopoulos Stadium; Attendance: 6,000; Referee: Marios Christoforou

21 November 2025 11	Pafos	2–1	Aris Limassol	Paphos
19:00 EET (UTC+2)	Correia 22', 67'; Quina (yellow card) 38'; Šunjić (yellow card) 43'	Report	Goldson 20'; Moucketou-Moussounda (yellow card) 26'; Charalampous (yellow card) 72'	Stadium: Stelios Kyriakides Stadium; Attendance: 6,188; Referee: Antoniou Menelaos

30 November 2025 12	Krasava Ypsonas	2–3	Pafos	Larnaca
17:00 EET (UTC+2)	Christodoulou (yellow card) 27' (goal) 60'; Kyriakou (yellow card) 79'; Trujić 84' (pen.); Do Couto (yellow card) 89'; Bah (yellow card) 90+8'	Report	Anderson 6'; Pêpê (penalty missed) 27'; Luiz 28'; Luckassen (yellow card) 45'; Dragomir (yellow card) 59'; Bruno (yellow card) 82'; Quina 90+5' (yellow card) 90+7'	Stadium: Ammochostos Stadium; Attendance: 350; Referee: Nikolas Liotatis

5 December 2025 13	Pafos	4–0	Akritas Chlorakas	Paphos
18:00 EET (UTC+2)	Šunjić (yellow card) 23'; Correia 35'; Bruno 42' (yellow card) 60'; Anderson 74'; Bassouamina 79'	Report	Riera (yellow card) 58'; Zabelin (yellow card) 83'	Stadium: Stelios Kyriakides Stadium; Referee: Chrysovalantis Theouli

14 December 2025 14	Enosis Neon Paralimni	0–2	Pafos	Paralimni
19:00 EET (UTC+2)	Šakić (yellow card) 66'; Kosmas (yellow card) 73'	Report	Bruno 60'; Luckassen 74'	Stadium: Paralimni Stadium; Attendance: 200; Referee: Konstantinos Neofytou

4 January 2026 16	Apollon Limassol	2–1	Pafos	Kolossi
19:00 EET (UTC+2)	Marques 6'; Lam (yellow card) 27'; Rodrigues 52'; Duodu (yellow card) 70'; Brandon (yellow card) 74'	Report	Bruno 38' (yellow card) 38'; Luckassen (yellow card) 40'; Luiz (yellow card) 70'	Stadium: Alphamega Stadium; Attendance: 4,000; Referee: Asghar Tehrani

12 January 2026 17	Pafos	2–0	Omonia Aradippou	Paphos
19:00 EET (UTC+2)	Correia 11' (yellow card) 77'; Jajá 90+3'	Report	Antoniou (yellow card) 53'; Georgiou (yellow card) 69'	Stadium: Stelios Kyriakides Stadium; Attendance: 929; Referee: Panagiotis Chatzigeorgiou

17 January 2026 18	Olympiakos Nicosia	2–0	Pafos	Strovolos
19:00 EET (UTC+2)	Vieirinha (yellow card) 40'; Gomes (yellow card) 48'; Charalampous 72'; Felipe 79'	Report	Mimović (yellow card) 76'; Šunjić (yellow card) 86'	Stadium: GSP Stadium; Referee: Marios Christoforou

25 January 2026 19	Pafos	1–2	AEK Larnaca	Paphos
19:00 EET (UTC+2)	Sema (yellow card) 27'; Anderson 77'	Report	Miramón 4'; Cabrera (yellow card) 37'; Ivanović 87'	Stadium: Stelios Kyriakides Stadium; Attendance: 4,000; Referee: Dimitris Solomou

31 January 2026 20	Ethnikos Achna	2–1	Pafos	Achna
16:00 EET (UTC+2)	Giousis 6', 88'; Flores (yellow card) 77'; Siverio (yellow card) 84'; Felipe (yellow card) 87'; Papageorgiou (yellow card) 90+10'	Report	Jajá (yellow card) 39'; Luiz (yellow card) 47'; Sema (yellow card) 56'; Luckassen (yellow card) 66' (red card) FT 83'; Gorter (yellow card) 90+1' (red card) FT	Stadium: Dasaki Stadium; Referee: Panagiotis Chatzigeorgiou

4 February 2026 15	Pafos	2–0	APOEL	Paphos
19:00 EET (UTC+2)	Bruno (yellow card) 34'; Šunjić (yellow card) 39' (goal) 56'; Luiz (yellow card) 45+5' (penalty missed) 62'; Quina (yellow card) 49'; Brito 90+1'	Report	Tomás (yellow card) 45+4'; Rosa (yellow card) 74'; Brorsson (yellow card) 90+8'	Stadium: Stelios Kyriakides Stadium; Attendance: 6,004; Referee: Konstantinos Fellas
Note: Match originally scheduled and postponed on 21 December 2025 due to extreme weather.

8 February 2026 21	Pafos	2–4	Omonia	Paphos
19:00 EET (UTC+2)	Pileas 9'; Šunjić (yellow card) 28'; Quina (yellow card) 37'; Lelê 79'; Luiz (yellow card) 90+7'	Report	Mmaee (yellow card) 7' (goal) 12'; Coulibaly (yellow card) 45+3'; Semedo 50', 81', 90' (yellow card) 81'; Masouras (yellow card) 79'; Marić (yellow card) 90+3'	Stadium: Stelios Kyriakides Stadium; Attendance: 6,495; Referee: Marios Christoforou

15 February 2026 22	AEL Limassol	0–1	Pafos	Limassol
19:00 EET (UTC+2)	Sawo (yellow card) 36'; Ochoa (yellow card) 59'; Stevanović (yellow card) 79'	Report	Bruno 29'; Pêpê (yellow card) 37'; Dragomir (yellow card) 55'; Jajá (yellow card) 64'; Guessand (yellow card) 78'	Stadium: Alphamega Stadium; Attendance: 3,000; Referee: Kyriakos Athanasiou

21 February 2026 23	Pafos	0–0	Anorthosis Famagusta	Paphos
18:00 EET (UTC+2)	Dragomir (yellow card) 57'; Gorter (red card) 68'	Report	Chrysostomou (yellow card) 34'; Ilia (yellow card) 90+16'	Stadium: Stelios Kyriakides Stadium; Attendance: 3,500; Referee: Ioannis Christodoulou

1 March 2026 24	Aris Limassol	2–2	Pafos	Limassol
19:00 EET (UTC+2)	Sané (yellow card) 36'; Montnor 76'; Gomis 90+1'	Report	Anderson 79', 90+8' (pen.); Ioannou (yellow card) 84'	Stadium: Alphamega Stadium; Attendance: 2,000; Referee: Marios Christoforou

7 March 2026 25	Pafos	7–0	Krasava Ypsonas	Paphos
18:00 EET (UTC+2)	Correia 12', 37', 42', 47'; Sema (yellow card) 15'; Anderson 18'; Jajá 85'; Bassouamina 89'	Report	Bah (yellow card) 55'	Stadium: Stelios Kyriakides Stadium; Attendance: 2,880; Referee: Konstantinos Fotiou

14 March 2026 26	Akritas Chlorakas	0–4	Pafos	Chloraka
18:00 EET (UTC+2)	Fernández (yellow card) 4'; Miller (yellow card) 44'	Report	Šunjić (yellow card) 14' (goal) 47'; Correia 19'; Luiz 78'; Lelê 90'	Stadium: Chloraka Municipal Stadium; Referee: Antoniou Menelaos

==== Championship round ====
===== League table =====
Pos	Team	Pld	W	D	L	GF	GA	GD	Pts	Qualification
2	AEK Larnaca	36	20	9	7	62	33	+29	69	Qualification for the Conference League second qualifying round
3	Apollon Limassol	36	20	7	9	52	41	+11	67	Qualification for the Conference League second qualifying round
4	Pafos	36	18	8	10	66	38	+28	62	Qualification for the Europa League second qualifying round (Note: The winner of the 2025–26 Cypriot Cup (Pafos) qualified for the Europa League second qualifying round.)
5	APOEL	36	15	7	14	53	45	+8	52	
6	Aris Limassol	36	14	9	13	61	45	+16	51	

Source: Soccerway
Rules for classification: 1) Points; 2) Points in regular season; 3) Head-to-head points in regular season; 4) Head-to-head goal difference in regular season; 5) Head-to-head goals scored in regular season; 6) Head-to-head away goals scored in regular season (if two teams tied); 7) Goal difference; 8) Goals scored; 9) Fair play ranking; 10) Drawing of lots.

===== Results summary =====
Overall								Home						Away					
Pld	W	D	L	GF	GA	GD	Pts	W	D	L	GF	GA	GD	W	D	L	GF	GA	GD
10	2	5	3	13	14	−1	11	2	2	1	6	4	+2	0	3	2	7	10	−3

Last updated: 22 May 2026.
Source: Results

===== Results by results =====
Matchday	27	28	29	30	31	32	33	34	35	36
Ground	H	A	A	H	A	A	H	H	A	H
Result	D	L	D	D	D	L	L	W	D	W
Position	4	4	4	4	4	4	4	4	4	4

Updated to match(es) played on 22 May 2026. Source: Results
A = Away; H = Home; W = Win; D = Draw; L = Loss; P = Postponed

===== Results =====
22 March 2026 27	Pafos	1–1	Apollon Limassol	Paphos
17:00 EET (UTC+2)	Quina 15'; Ioannou (yellow card) 83'	Report	Ljubić 35'; Thomas (yellow card) 65'	Stadium: Stelios Kyriakides Stadium; Referee: Gianluca Manganiello

4 April 2026 28	Omonia	2–0	Pafos	Strovolos
19:00 EEST (UTC+3)	Semedo 11' (yellow card) 24'; Mmaee 20'; Ewandro (yellow card) 48'; Coulibaly (yellow card) 56'; Kyriakidis (yellow card) 78'; Marić (yellow card) 90+1'; Diounkou (yellow card) 90+1'	Report	Jajá (yellow card) 70'; Luckassen (yellow card) 87'; Pêpê (yellow card) 89'	Stadium: GSP Stadium; Attendance: 11,299; Referee: Andris Treimanis

14 April 2026 29	Aris Limassol	1–1	Pafos	Limassol
17:00 EEST (UTC+3)	Charalampous 13' (yellow card) 90+1'; McCausland (yellow card) 88'	Report	Lelê 86'; Luckassen (yellow card) 90+1'	Stadium: Alphamega Stadium; Referee: Stefan Ebner

18 April 2026 30	Pafos	1–1	AEK Larnaca	Paphos
18:00 EEST (UTC+3)	Jajá 19' (yellow card) 35'; Brito (yellow card) 57'; Gorter (yellow card) 82'	Report	Ioannou (yellow card) 61'; Mudražija 89'	Stadium: Stelios Kyriakides Stadium; Referee: Jacob Karlsen

26 April 2026 31	APOEL	3–3	Pafos	Strovolos
17:00 EEST (UTC+3)	Dražić 5', 28' (yellow card) 63'; Tomás (yellow card) 32'; Olayinka 74'; Koutsakos (yellow card) 88'	Report	Ioannou 17'; Luckassen (yellow card) 84' (goal) 90+3', 90+5'	Stadium: GSP Stadium; Attendance: 4,650; Referee: Igor Pajac

3 May 2026 32	Apollon Limassol	2–1	Pafos	Kolossi
19:00 EEST (UTC+3)	Luckassen 10' (o.g.); Thomas 21'; Assunção (yellow card) 50'; Kvída (yellow card) 50'; Adoni (yellow card) 78'	Report	Šunjić (yellow card) 9'; Luiz 25' (yellow card) 88'; Luckassen (yellow card) 53'; Dragomir (yellow card) 60'	Stadium: Alphamega Stadium; Referee: Lasse Graagaard

6 May 2026 33	Pafos	0–2	Omonia	Paphos
19:00 EEST (UTC+3)	Lelê (yellow card) 83'; Quina (yellow card) 87'	Report	Marić (yellow card) 30'; Odubajo (yellow card) 43'; Neofytou (yellow card) 62' (goal) 79'; Eraković 85' (yellow card) 86'	Stadium: Stelios Kyriakides Stadium; Referee: Francesco Fourneau

10 May 2026 34	Pafos	2–0	Aris Limassol	Paphos
19:00 EEST (UTC+3)	Bassouamina (yellow card) 28'; Correia 30' (yellow card) 35'; Dragomir 49'; Ioannou (yellow card) 56'; Pêpê (yellow card) 61'; Gorter (yellow card) 90+5'	Report	Fi Akamba (yellow card) 76'	Stadium: Stelios Kyriakides Stadium; Referee: Radoslav Gidzhenov

16 May 2026 35	AEK Larnaca	2–2	Pafos	Larnaca
18:00 EEST (UTC+3)	Bajić 22'; Kyriakou (yellow card) 55'; Miličević 90+3' (pen.)	Report	Pêpê 31' (yellow card) 89'; Luiz (yellow card) 34'; Correia (yellow card) 45+2'; Luckassen (yellow card) 74'; Odefalk 88'; Silva (yellow card) 90+6'	Stadium: AEK Arena; Attendance: 1,500; Referee: Konstantinos Neofytou

22 May 2026 36	Pafos	2–0	APOEL	Paphos
17:30 EEST (UTC+3)	Lelê 19'; Brito (yellow card) 43'; Ioannou 45+1'; Silva (yellow card) 75'; Goldar (yellow card) 90+4'	Report	Laifis (yellow card) 33'; Antoniou (yellow card) 37'; Poursaitidis (yellow card) 87'	Stadium: Stelios Kyriakides Stadium; Referee: Kyriakos Athanasiou

=== Cypriot Cup ===
7 January 2026 Second round	Pafos	2–1	Akritas Chlorakas	Paphos
17:00 EET (UTC+2)	Pêpê 32'; Anderson 86'	Report	Miller (yellow card) 59'; Castro 83'; Zinonos (yellow card) 90'	Stadium: Stelios Kyriakides Stadium; Referee: Konstantinos Christou

11 February 2026 Quarter-final	Digenis Akritas Morphou	0–3	Pafos	Nicosia
17:00 EET (UTC+2)		Report	Anderson 21', 50'; Brito 29' (pen.)	Stadium: Makario Stadium; Referee: Nikolas Liotatis

8 April 2026 Semi-final 1st leg	AEL Limassol	1–2	Pafos	Limassol
19:00 EEST (UTC+3)	Maseko (yellow card) 34'; Sawo 45+3'; Bogdan (yellow card) 73'	Report	Jajá 11' (pen.), 38'; Ioannou (yellow card) 75'	Stadium: Alphamega Stadium; Referee: Joonas Jaanovits

22 April 2026 Semi-final 2nd leg	Pafos	3–1 (5–2 agg.)	AEL Limassol	Paphos
17:00 EEST (UTC+3)	Jajá (yellow card) 24' (goal) 45+2'; Luckassen (yellow card) 27'; Lelê 58'; Dragomir 88'	Report	Zdravkovski (yellow card) 25'; Stevanović (yellow card) 28'; Milosavljević 45+1'; Szöke (yellow card) 69'; Neofytou (yellow card) 84'	Stadium: Stelios Kyriakides Stadium; Referee: Ante Čulina

29 May 2026 Final	Apollon Limassol	0–2	Pafos	Nicosia
19:00 EEST (UTC+3)	Ljubić (yellow card) 11'; Adoni (yellow card) 77'; Stylianou (red card) 88'; Brandon (red card) 90+6'	Report	Jajá 85' (yellow card) 90'; Anderson (yellow card) 90+1'; Pêpê 90+2'; Correia (red card) 90+5'	Stadium: GSP Stadium; Attendance: 14,481; Referee: Marco Guida

=== UEFA Champions League ===
==== Qualifying phase ====
22 July 2025 Second qualifying round 1st leg	Pafos (Cyprus)	1–1	(Israel) Maccabi Tel Aviv	Limassol, Cyprus
20:00 EEST (UTC+3)	Tanković (yellow card) 75'; Correia (yellow card) 80'; Bassouamina 81'; Goldar (yellow card) 90'; Jajá (yellow card) 90+6'; Quina (yellow card) 90+7'	Report	Camara (yellow card) 27'; Patati (yellow card) 31'; Asante (yellow card) 45+2'; Madmon 90+10'	Stadium: Alphamega Stadium; Attendance: 4,557; Referee: Mykola Balakin (Ukraine)
Note: Match played at the Alphamega Stadium in Limassol, instead of Pafos' regular Stelios Kyriakides Stadium in Paphos, which did not meet UEFA requirements.

30 July 2025 Second qualifying round 2nd leg	Maccabi Tel Aviv (Israel)	0–1 (1–2 agg.)	(Cyprus) Pafos	Bačka Topola, Serbia
21:00 EEST (UTC+3)	Melika (red card) 30'; Camara (yellow card) 56'	Report	Luckassen (yellow card) 36'; Jajá 40'; Correia (yellow card) 67'; Quina (yellow card) 90+5'	Stadium: TSC Arena; Attendance: 654; Referee: Radu Petrescu (Romania)
Note: Due to the Gaza war, Israeli teams were required to play their home matches at neutral venues until further notice.

5 August 2025 Third qualifying round 1st leg	Dynamo Kyiv (Ukraine)	0–1	(Cyprus) Pafos	Lublin, Poland
22:00 EEST (UTC+3)	Mykhaylenko (yellow card) 16'; Shaparenko (yellow card) 90+9'	Report	Tanković (yellow card) 29'; Anderson 84'; Pêpê (yellow card) 90+4'; Šunjić (yellow card) 90+9'	Stadium: Arena Lublin; Attendance: 2,020; Referee: Sandro Schärer (Switzerland)
Note: Due to the Russian invasion of Ukraine, Ukrainian teams are required to play their home matches at neutral venues until further notice.

12 August 2025 Third qualifying round 2nd leg	Pafos (Cyprus)	2–0 (3–0 agg.)	(Ukraine) Dynamo Kyiv	Limassol, Cyprus
20:00 EEST (UTC+3)	Oršić 2'; Correia 55'; Quina (yellow card) 90+4'	Report	Vanat (yellow card) 40'	Stadium: Alphamega Stadium; Attendance: 7,601; Referee: Davide Massa (Italy)
Note: Match played at the Alphamega Stadium in Limassol, instead of Pafos' regular Stelios Kyriakides Stadium in Paphos, which did not meet UEFA requirements.

19 August 2025 Playoff round 1st leg	Red Star Belgrade (Serbia)	1–2	(Cyprus) Pafos	Belgrade, Serbia
22:00 EEST (UTC+3)	Duarte (penalty missed) 58' 58'; Ivanić (yellow card) 77'	Report	Correia 1'; Pêpê 52' (pen.); Langa (yellow card) 87'	Stadium: Red Star Stadium; Attendance: 43,411; Referee: Alejandro Hernández Hernández (Spain)

26 August 2025 Playoff round 2nd leg	Pafos (Cyprus)	1–1 (3–2 agg.)	(Serbia) Red Star Belgrade	Limassol, Cyprus
22:00 EEST (UTC+3)	Jajá (yellow card) 73' (goal) 89'; Bruno (yellow card) 86'; Pêpê (yellow card) 90+9'	Report	Krunić (yellow card) 33'; Veljković (yellow card) 33'; Babicka (yellow card) 53'; Ivanić 60'	Stadium: Alphamega Stadium; Attendance: 8,422; Referee: Michael Oliver (England)
Note: Match played at the Alphamega Stadium in Limassol, instead of Pafos' regular Stelios Kyriakides Stadium in Paphos, which did not meet UEFA requirements.

==== League phase ====
Pos	Team	Pld	W	D	L	GF	GA	GD	Pts	Qualification
24	(Portuguese Football Federation) Benfica	8	3	0	5	10	12	−2	9	Advance to knockout phase play-offs (unseeded)
25	(French Football Federation) Marseille	8	3	0	5	11	14	−3	9	
26	(Cyprus Football Association) Pafos	8	2	3	3	8	11	−3	9	
27	(Royal Belgian Football Association) Union Saint-Gilloise	8	3	0	5	8	17	−9	9	
28	(Royal Dutch Football Association) PSV Eindhoven	8	2	2	4	16	16	0	8	

Source: UEFA
Rules for classification: League phase tiebreakers

17 September 2025 1	Olympiacos (Greece)	0–0	(Cyprus) Pafos	Piraeus, Greece
19:45 EEST (UTC+3)	García (yellow card) 20'; Pirola (yellow card) 32'; Taremi (yellow card) 72'	Report	Bruno (yellow card) 15' (yellow-red card) 26'; Langa (yellow card) 88'	Stadium: Karaiskakis Stadium; Attendance: 32,050; Referee: István Kovács (Romania)

30 September 2025 2	Pafos (Cyprus)	1–5	(Germany) Bayern Munich	Limassol, Cyprus
22:00 EEST (UTC+3)	Oršić 45' (yellow card) 46'	Report	Kane 15', 34'; Guerreiro 20'; Jackson 31'; Olise 68'	Stadium: Alphamega Stadium; Attendance: 9,187; Referee: Manfredas Lukjančukas (Lithuania)
Note: Match played at the Alphamega Stadium in Limassol, instead of Pafos' regular Stelios Kyriakides Stadium in Paphos, which did not meet UEFA requirements.

21 October 2025 3	Kairat (Kazakhstan)	0–0	(Cyprus) Pafos	Almaty, Kazhkstan
19:45 EEST (UTC+3)	Satpayev (yellow card) 21'; Arad (yellow card) 40'; Tuyakbaev (yellow card) 82'	Report	Correia (red card) 4'; Šunjić (yellow card) 80'	Stadium: Central Stadium; Attendance: 16,478; Referee: Chris Kavanagh (England)

5 November 2025 4	Pafos (Cyprus)	1–0	(Spain) Villarreal	Limassol, Cyprus
19:45 EET (UTC+2)	Luckassen 46' (yellow card) 69'	Report	Veiga (yellow card) 76'; Gueye (yellow card) 90'	Stadium: Alphamega Stadium; Attendance: 6,314; Referee: Sven Jablonski (Germany)
Note: Match played at the Alphamega Stadium in Limassol, instead of Pafos' regular Stelios Kyriakides Stadium in Paphos, which did not meet UEFA requirements.

26 November 2025 5	Pafos (Cyprus)	2–2	(France) Monaco	Limassol, Cyprus
19:45 EET (UTC+2)	Luiz 18' (yellow card) 88'; Goldar (yellow card) 45+3'; Salisu 88' (o.g.)	Report	Minamino 5' Camara (yellow card) 21'; Balogun 26'; Golovin (yellow card) 28'; Salisu (yellow card) 90+1'	Stadium: Alphamega Stadium; Attendance: 8,347; Referee: Ivan Kružliak (Slovakia)
Note: Match played at the Alphamega Stadium in Limassol, instead of Pafos' regular Stelios Kyriakides Stadium in Paphos, which did not meet UEFA requirements.

10 December 2025 6	Juventus (Italy)	2–0	(Cyprus) Pafos	Turin, Italy
22:00 EET (UTC+2)	Locatelli (yellow card) 55'; McKennie 67'; David 73'	Report	Šunjić (yellow card) 45'	Stadium: Juventus Stadium; Attendance: 40,336; Referee: Jesús Gil Manzano (Spain)

21 January 2026 7	Chelsea (England)	1–0	(Cyprus) Pafos	London, England
22:00 EET (UTC+2)	Gittens (yellow card) 73'; Caicedo 78'; Fernández (yellow card) 86'	Report	Oršić (yellow card) 33'; Sema (yellow card) 56'; Šunjić (yellow card) 78'	Stadium: Stamford Bridge; Attendance: 30,774; Referee: Erik Lambrechts (Belgium)

28 January 2026 8	Pafos (Cyprus)	4–1	(Czech Republic) Slavia Prague	Limassol, Cyprus
22:00 EET (UTC+2)	Dragomir 17'; Bruno 53'; Anderson 84'; Oršić 87'; Luiz (yellow card) 90+1'; Gorter (yellow card) 90+6'	Report	Zima (yellow card) 26'; Chaloupek 44'; Bořil (red card) 59'	Stadium: Alphamega Stadium; Attendance: 5,109; Referee: Tobias Stieler (Germany)
Note: Match played at the Alphamega Stadium in Limassol, instead of Pafos' regular Stelios Kyriakides Stadium in Paphos, which did not meet UEFA requirements.

== Squad statistics ==
As of match played 29 May 2026

=== Appearances and goals ===
No.	Pos	Nat	Player	Total		Cypriot First Division		Cypriot Cup		Super Cup		UEFA Champions League	
No.	Pos	Nat	Player	Apps	Goals	Apps	Goals	Apps	Goals	Apps	Goals	Apps	Goals
1	GK	(Netherlands) NED	Jay Gorter	21	0	16	0	3	0	0	0	2	0
2	DF	(Cyprus) CYP	Kostas Pileas	34	1	12+7	1	0+1	0	0+1	0	10+3	0
4	DF	(Brazil) BRA	David Luiz	38	6	22+4	5	4	0	1	0	7	1
5	DF	(Spain) ESP	David Goldar	27	0	12+1	0	1	0	1	0	11+1	0
7	FW	(Brazil) BRA	Bruno Felipe	46	6	24+4	5	3+1	0	1	0	12+1	1
8	MF	(Portugal) POR	Domingos Quina	47	7	22+9	6	2+2	0	1	1	4+7	0
9	FW	(Republic of the Congo) CGO	Mons Bassouamina	25	3	0+14	2	0+2	0	0	0	0+9	1
11	FW	(Brazil) BRA	Jajá	47	9	16+12	3	3+2	4	0+1	0	6+7	2
12	MF	(Sweden) SWE	Ken Sema	36	0	12+11	0	1+1	0	0	0	2+9	0
14	DF	(Cyprus) CYP	Nikolas Ioannou	20	2	16	2	4	0	0	0	0	0
17	FW	(Croatia) CRO	Mislav Oršić	49	4	23+8	1	2+1	0	1	0	11+3	3
18	FW	(Brazil) BRA	Lelê	14	5	7+4	4	3	1	0	0	0	0
19	DF	(France) FRA	Axel Guessand	12	0	6+4	0	2	0	0	0	0	0
20	MF	(Sweden) SWE	Wilmer Odefalk	13	1	1+11	1	0	0	0+1	0	0	0
21	DF	(Serbia) SRB	Ognjen Mimović	28	0	13+11	0	1+2	0	0+1	0	0	0
23	DF	(Ghana) GHA	Derrick Luckassen	47	6	28	5	4	0	1	0	14	1
26	MF	(Bosnia and Herzegovina) BIH	Ivan Šunjić	46	3	29	3	3+1	0	0	0	13	0
30	MF	(Romania) ROU	Vlad Dragomir	55	7	30+5	5	5	1	1	0	14	1
33	FW	(Brazil) BRA	Anderson Silva	50	14	16+16	9	2+2	3	1	0	9+4	2
35	DF	(Brazil) BRA	Pedrão	2	0	0+1	0	0	0	0	0	0+1	0
42	FW	(Cyprus) CYP	Georgios Michael	2	0	0	0	0+1	0	0	0	0+1	0
50	MF	(Portugal) POR	Alexandre Brito	12	2	2+6	1	1+3	1	0	0	0	0
77	DF	(Cape Verde) CPV	João Correia	25	12	10+2	10	3	0	1	0	8+1	2
80	MF	(Portugal) POR	Dani Silva	18	0	7+8	0	2+1	0	0	0	0	0
87	FW	(Brazil) BRA	Pedro Caldieraro	2	0	0	0	0+1	0	0	0	0+1	0
88	MF	(Portugal) POR	Pêpê	53	5	32+2	2	4	2	1	0	14	1
93	GK	(Cyprus) CYP	Neofytos Michail	34	0	16+3	0	1+1	0	1	0	12	0
99	GK	(Greece) GRE	Athanasios Papadoudis	5	0	4	0	1	0	0	0	0	0
Players away on loan:
10	FW	(Belgium) BEL	Landry Dimata	22	1	9+6	1	0	0	0+1	0	1+5	0
Players who appeared for Pafos but left during the season:
22	FW	(Sweden) SWE	Muamer Tanković	5	0	0	0	0	0	0	0	4+1	0
25	DF	(Mozambique) MOZ	Bruno Langa	18	0	1+6	0	0	0	0	0	0+11	0
70	FW	(Cyprus) CYP	Marios Ilia	1	0	0	0	0	0	0	0	0+1	0

=== Goal scorers ===
Place	Position	Nation	Number	Name	Cypriot First Division	Cypriot Cup	Super Cup	UEFA Champions League	Total
1	FW	(Brazil)	33	Anderson Silva	9	3	0	2	14
2	DF	(Cape Verde)	77	João Correia	10	0	0	2	12
3	FW	(Brazil)	11	Jajá	3	4	0	2	9
4	MF	(Portugal)	8	Domingos Quina	6	0	1	0	7
4	MF	(Romania)	30	Vlad Dragomir	5	1	0	1	7
6	FW	(Brazil)	7	Bruno Felipe	5	0	0	1	6
6	DF	(Ghana)	23	Derrick Luckassen	5	0	0	1	6
8	FW	(Brazil)	18	Lelê	4	1	0	0	5
8	DF	(Brazil)	4	David Luiz	4	0	0	1	5
8	MF	(Portugal)	88	Pêpê	2	2	0	1	5
11	FW	(Croatia)	17	Mislav Oršić	1	0	0	3	4
12	FW	(Republic of the Congo)	9	Mons Bassouamina	2	0	0	1	3
13	MF	(Bosnia and Herzegovina)	26	Ivan Šunjić	2	0	0	0	2
13	DF	(Cyprus)	14	Nikolas Ioannou	2	0	0	0	2
13	MF	(Portugal)	50	Alexandre Brito	1	1	0	0	2
15	FW	(Belgium)	10	Landry Dimata	1	0	0	0	1
15	DF	(Cyprus)	2	Kostas Pileas	1	0	0	0	1
15	MF	(Sweden)	20	Wilmer Odefalk	1	0	0	0	1
15				Own Goal	0	0	0	1	1
Total					64	12	1	16	93

=== Clean sheets ===
Place	Position	Nation	Number	Name	Cypriot First Division	Cypriot Cup	Super Cup	UEFA Champions League	Total
1	GK	(Cyprus)	93	Neofytos Michail	9	0	0	6	15
2	GK	(Netherlands)	1	Jay Gorter	6	1	0	0	7
3	GK	(Greece)	99	Athanasios Papadoudis	1	1	0	0	2
Total					13	2	0	6	21

Jay Gorter & Neofytos Michail both played in Pafos's 2-0 victory over APOEL on 4 February 2026
Jay Gorter & Neofytos Michail both played in Pafos's 0-0 draw against Anorthosis Famagusta on 21 February 2026

=== Disciplinary record ===
Number	Nation	Position	Name	Cypriot First Division		Cypriot Cup		Super Cup		UEFA Champions League		Total	
Number	Nation	Position	Name	Booked	Sent off (straight red)	Booked	Sent off (straight red)	Booked	Sent off (straight red)	Booked	Sent off (straight red)	Booked	Sent off (straight red)
1	(Netherlands)	GK	Jay Gorter	3	2	0	0	0	0	1	0	4	2
2	(Cyprus)	DF	Kostas Pileas	1	0	0	0	0	0	0	0	1	0
4	(Brazil)	DF	David Luiz	8	0	0	0	0	0	2	0	10	0
5	(Spain)	DF	David Goldar	3	0	0	0	0	0	2	0	5	0
7	(Brazil)	FW	Bruno Felipe	5	0	0	0	0	0	3	1	8	1
8	(Portugal)	MF	Domingos Quina	5	0	0	0	1	0	3	0	9	0
9	(Republic of the Congo)	FW	Mons Bassouamina	1	0	0	0	0	0	0	0	1	0
11	(Brazil)	FW	Jajá	5	0	2	0	0	0	2	0	9	0
12	(Sweden)	MF	Ken Sema	5	0	0	0	0	0	1	0	6	0
14	(Cyprus)	DF	Nikolas Ioannou	3	0	1	0	0	0	0	0	4	0
17	(Croatia)	FW	Mislav Oršić	1	0	0	0	0	0	2	0	3	0
18	(Brazil)	FW	Lelê	1	0	0	0	0	0	0	0	1	0
19	(France)	DF	Axel Guessand	1	0	0	0	0	0	0	0	1	0
21	(Serbia)	DF	Ognjen Mimović	2	0	0	0	0	0	0	0	2	0
23	(Ghana)	DF	Derrick Luckassen	12	2	1	0	1	0	2	0	16	2
26	(Bosnia and Herzegovina)	MF	Ivan Šunjić	10	0	0	0	0	0	4	0	14	0
30	(Romania)	MF	Vlad Dragomir	6	0	0	0	0	0	0	0	6	0
33	(Brazil)	FW	Anderson Silva	1	0	0	0	0	0	0	0	1	0
50	(Portugal)	MF	Alexandre Brito	2	0	0	0	0	0	0	0	2	0
77	(Cape Verde)	DF	João Correia	4	0	0	1	0	0	2	1	6	2
80	(Portugal)	MF	Dani Silva	2	0	0	0	0	0	0	0	2	0
88	(Portugal)	MF	Pêpê	5	0	0	0	0	0	2	0	7	0
Players away on loan:
Players who left Pafos during the season:
22	(Sweden)	FW	Muamer Tanković	0	0	0	0	0	0	2	0	2	0
25	(Mozambique)	DF	Bruno Langa	0	0	0	0	0	0	2	0	2	0
Total				86	4	4	1	2	0	30	2	122	7
