= Guessand =

Guessand is a surname. Notable people with the surname include:

- Axel Guessand (born 2004), French footballer, plays for Pafos as at 2026
- Evann Guessand (born 2001), French footballer, plays for Crystal Palace (on loan from Aston Villa) and Ivory Coast as at 2026
