= Ken Sema =

Swedish footballer

- Sema with Sweden in 2026

Personal information
- Full name: Ken Nlata Sema
- Date of birth: 30 September 1993 (age 33)
- Place of birth: Norrköping, Sweden
- Height: 1.80 m (5 ft 11 in)
- Positions: Midfielder; wing-back

Team information
- Current team: Pafos
- Number: 12

Youth career
- –2012: IFK Norrköping

Senior career*
Years	Team	Apps	(Gls)
2013	IFK Norrköping	0	(0)
2013	→ IF Sylvia (loan)	22	(4)
2014–2015	Ljungskile SK	60	(11)
2016–2018	Östersunds FK	58	(8)
2018–2025	Watford	159	(11)
2019–2020	→ Udinese (loan)	32	(2)
2025–	Pafos	49	(1)

International career^{‡}
2016	Sweden Olympic	4	(1)
2017–	Sweden	35	(5)
- * Club domestic league appearances and goals as of 18:33, 22 November 2026 (UTC) ‡ National team caps and goals as of 22:10, 2 October 2026 (UTC)

Ken Nlata Sema (/ˈsɛmə/; born 30 September 1993) is a Swedish professional footballer who plays as a left midfielder for Cypriot First Division club Pafos and the Sweden national team.

== Club career ==
=== Early career ===
Sema got promoted to the IFK Norrköping first team as a 19-year old in 2013. However, he spent the entire season on loan to IF Sylvia and did not get his contract renewed after it expired at the end of the season.

In 2014, he signed for second-tier team Ljungskile SK.

=== Östersunds FK ===
In January 2016, Sema signed for Östersunds FK in the Allsvenskan, where he would have his major breakthrough. Sema won the 2016–17 Svenska Cupen with Östersund, assisting three of their four goals in the final, and later played a major role in their 2017–18 UEFA Europa League campaign. On 22 February 2018, Sema scored a goal in a 2–1 win against Arsenal in the round of 32. Despite this, Östersund were eliminated from the Europa League after losing 2–4 on aggregate.

=== Watford ===
On 4 July 2018, Östersunds FK chairman Daniel Kindberg revealed that Sema was close to signing for Premier League club Watford on a five-year contract. The next day, Watford confirmed the signing. He scored his first goal against Bournemouth on 2 January 2019 in a 3–3 draw.

He was integral in helping Watford get promoted back to the Premier League in the 2020–21 season, registering six goals and adding a further six assists.

On 6 February 2024, Sema made his 150th appearance for Watford in their FA Cup fourth round replay defeat to Southampton.

On 29 January 2025, Sema departed Watford having had his contract terminated by mutual consent.

==== Loan to Udinese ====
On 22 August 2019, Udinese Calcio signed Sema on a season-long loan from Watford. He made his Serie A debut for Udinese on 25 August 2019 in a 1–0 win against AC Milan.

=== Pafos ===
On 31 January 2025, Sema signed a contract with Cypriot First Division club Pafos. Sema was part of the Pafos side that won the club's first Cypriot league title during the 2024–25 season.

On 5 November 2025, Sema provided the assist for Derrick Luckassen's goal in a 1–0 win over Villarreal in the UEFA Champions League. It was the club's first ever win in the Champions League proper.

== International career ==
=== Early career ===
In 2016, Sema was a part of the Sweden Olympic team that played in Brazil, and scored his first U23 goal in a match against South Korea Olympic. In January 2017, he debuted for the Sweden senior team in a friendly 6–0 win over Slovakia.

Sema was an unused substitute in the two-legged playoff against Italy in November 2017, which Sweden won, and therefore qualified for the 2018 FIFA World Cup. Despite featuring in commercials with the rest of the Sweden squad before the World Cup, Sema was eventually left out of the World Cup squad.

=== UEFA Euro 2020 ===
Sema made his competitive international debut in a UEFA Euro 2020 qualifying game against the Faroe Islands national football team which Sweden won 3–0. He was part of Sweden's squad at UEFA Euro 2020 that reached the round of 16 before being eliminated by Ukraine.

=== Later career and 2026 FIFA World Cup ===
On 15 June 2025, Sema scored a hat-trick in an international friendly against Algeria which Sweden won 4–3.

Sema was included in Sweden's squad for the 2026 FIFA World Cup, and made his only appearances in the tournament in a group stage game against Japan, replacing Elliot Stroud in the 75th minute of a 1–1 draw.

== Playing style ==
Sema is known for his hard work, a trait that has made him very popular with Watford fans. He likes to dribble past opponents to get into good crossing positions. He is mainly a winger but has occasionally been used at left back or wing back, due to his ability to work hard and track back defensively. He is affectionately known as King Ken by Watford fans.

== Personal life ==
Sema was born in Sweden to Congolese parents, and his brother Maic Sema is also a footballer. He speaks with a stammer, and after a video went viral of him doing a post match interview with Watford TV, he was praised as a role model for children and adults with speech impediments.

== Career statistics ==
=== Club ===
As of match played 15 October 2026

Appearances and goals by club, season and competition
Club	Season	League			National cup (Note: Includes Svenska Cupen, Coppa Italia, FA Cup, Cypriot Cup)		League cup (Note: Includes EFL Cup)		Continental		Other		Total	
Club	Season	Division	Apps	Goals	Apps	Goals	Apps	Goals	Apps	Goals	Apps	Goals	Apps	Goals
IFK Norrköping	2013	Allsvenskan	0	0	0	0	—		—		—		0	0
IF Sylvia (loan)	2013	Division 1 Södra	22	4	0	0	—		—		—		22	4
Ljungskile SK	2014	Superettan	30	7	6	0	—		—		—		36	7
Ljungskile SK	2015	Superettan	30	4	4	3	—		—		—		34	7
Ljungskile SK	Total		60	11	10	3	—		0	0	—		70	14
Östersunds FK	2016	Allsvenskan	23	4	3	0	—		0	0	—		26	4
Östersunds FK	2017	Allsvenskan	24	4	5	0	—		13 (Note: Appearances in UEFA Europa League)	1	—		42	5
Östersunds FK	2018	Allsvenskan	11	0	0	0	—		0	0	—		11	0
Östersunds FK	Total		58	8	8	0	—		13	1	—		79	9
Watford	2018–19	Premier League	17	1	3	0	2	0	—		—		22	1
Watford	2019–20	Premier League	0	0	0	0	0	0	—		—		0	0
Watford	2020–21	Championship	41	5	1	0	1	1	—		—		43	6
Watford	2021–22	Premier League	18	0	1	0	2	0	—		—		21	0
Watford	2022–23	Championship	40	4	0	0	1	0	—		—		41	4
Watford	2023–24	Championship	29	1	2	0	1	0	—		—		32	1
Watford	2024–25	Championship	14	0	0	0	3	0	—		—		17	0
Watford	Total		159	11	7	0	10	1	—		—		176	12
Udinese (loan)	2019–20	Serie A	32	2	1	0	—		—		—		33	2
Pafos	2024–25	Cypriot First Division	16	0	3	0	—		4 (Note: Appearances in UEFA Conference League)	0	—		23	0
Pafos	2025–26	Cypriot First Division	23	0	2	0	—		11 (Note: Appearances in UEFA Champions League)	0	—		36	0
Pafos	2026–27	Cypriot First Division	4	0	0	0	—		4 (Note: Two appearances in UEFA Europa League, two appearances and one goal in UEFA Conference League)	1	1 (Note: Appearance in Cypriot Super Cup)	0	9	1
Pafos	Total		43	0	5	0	—		19	1	1	0	68	1
Career total			356	36	30	3	10	1	32	2	1	0	428	42

=== International ===
As of match played on 2 October 2026

Appearances and goals by national team and year
National team	Year	Apps	Goals
Sweden	2017	1	0
Sweden	2018	5	0
Sweden	2019	1	0
Sweden	2020	2	0
Sweden	2021	4	0
Sweden	2022	1	0
Sweden	2023	4	0
Sweden	2024	6	1
Sweden	2025	8	4
Sweden	2026	3	0
Total		35	5

Scores and results list Sweden's goal tally first, score column indicates score after each Sema goal.

List of international goals scored by Ken Sema
No.	Date	Venue	Opponent	Score	Result	Competition
1.	11 October 2024	Tehelné pole, Bratislava, Slovakia	Slovakia	2–0	2–2	2024–25 UEFA Nations League
2.	25 March 2025	Strawberry Arena, Solna, Sweden	Northern Ireland	3–0	5–1	Friendly
3.	10 June 2025	Strawberry Arena, Solna, Sweden	Algeria	1–0	4–3	Friendly
4.	10 June 2025	Strawberry Arena, Solna, Sweden	Algeria	2–0	4–3	Friendly
5.	10 June 2025	Strawberry Arena, Solna, Sweden	Algeria	3–0	4–3	Friendly

== Honours ==
Östersund

- Svenska Cupen: 2016–17

Pafos

- Cypriot First Division: 2024–25
- Cypriot Cup: 2025–26
- Cypriot Super Cup: 2026
