= Ivan Šunjić =

Bosnian footballer (born 1996)

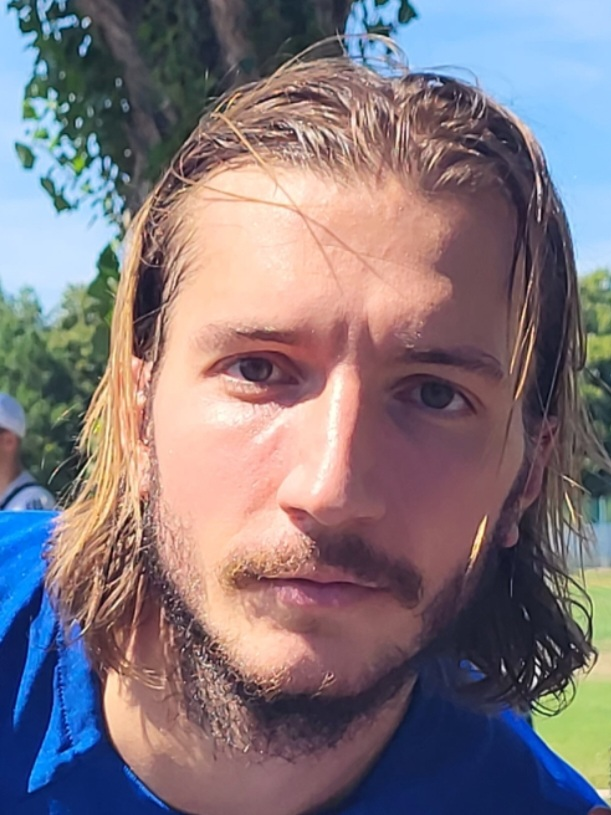
- Šunjić in 2022

Personal information
- Full name: Ivan Šunjić
- Date of birth: 9 October 1996 (age 30)
- Place of birth: Zenica, Bosnia and Herzegovina
- Height: 1.84 m (6 ft 0 in)
- Position: Defensive midfielder

Team information
- Current team: Pafos
- Number: 26

Senior career*
Years	Team	Apps	(Gls)
2014–2015	Dinamo Zagreb	1	(0)
2015–2016	Dinamo Zagreb II	30	(1)
2016–2018	Lokomotiva	62	(7)
2018–2019	Dinamo Zagreb	24	(0)
2018	→ Lokomotiva (loan)	11	(3)
2019–2024	Birmingham City	160	(7)
2022–2023	→ Hertha BSC (loan)	18	(0)
2024–	Pafos	70	(8)

International career^{‡}
2012	Croatia U16	6	(0)
2012–2013	Croatia U17	21	(0)
2013–2014	Croatia U18	4	(0)
2014–2015	Croatia U19	8	(3)
2014–2019	Croatia U21	18	(1)
2017	Croatia	1	(0)
2024–	Bosnia and Herzegovina	17	(0)
- * Club domestic league appearances and goals as of 8 November 2026 ‡ National team caps and goals as of 2 October 2026

Ivan Šunjić (born 9 October 1996) is a Bosnian professional footballer who plays as a defensive midfielder for Cyprus First Division club Pafos and the Bosnia and Herzegovina national team.

Šunjić previously played for Dinamo Zagreb and Lokomotiva in Croatia, before joining English club Birmingham City in 2019. He spent the 2022–23 season on loan to Bundesliga club Hertha BSC, and was released at the end of the 2023–24 season. Following his release from Birmingham City, Šunjić joined the Cypriot club Pafos in August 2024, helping the club to achieve their first league title in his debut season.

Šunjić is of Croat descent and was born in Bosnia and Herzegovina, but emigrated to Croatia as a young child. He played for Croatia's youth teams from under-16 to under-21 level and played once for the senior team in 2017. In 2024, Šunjić switched his allegiance to Bosnia and Herzegovina. He has earned 15 caps since, and has represented the nation at the 2026 FIFA World Cup.

== Early life ==
Šunjić, an ethnic Croat, was born on 9 October 1996 in Zenica, Bosnia and Herzegovina. He and his family – father Jozo, mother Aleksandra, and older brother Nikola – moved from their home in Kakanj to Zagreb, Croatia, in 2000.

== Club career ==
=== Early career ===
Šunjić began his football career in the youth ranks of NK Špansko. He moved to NK Zagreb in 2009, and joined Dinamo Zagreb at cadet level in 2012.

The 18-year-old Šunjić made his senior debut for Dinamo Zagreb on 10 May 2014, replacing Ante Ćorić after 59 minutes of a 2–1 away defeat against Istra in the Prva NL, straight after Jozo Šimunović had been sent off and Istra had tied the scores via the ensuing penalty. With the league title already secured, Dinamo fielded a weakened side for the match, with many of the regular first-team players rested between the two legs of the 2014 Cup Final. He helped Dinamo II gain promotion from the Tréca NL in 2014–15 and played regularly for them in the Druga NL, but his first-team involvement was limited to 25 minutes in an early round of the 2015–16 Croatian Cup before he moved on.

=== Lokomotiva Zagreb ===
After appearing only for the reserves, he joined Lokomotiva on 10 February 2016. On 13 May 2017, he scored his first goal for the club in the dying minutes of a 2–0 league victory over Inter Zaprešić.

Ahead of the 2017–18 season, Šunjić was named club captain. On 15 September, he scored the winning goal in the final minutes of a 1–0 league victory against Cibalia. On 12 February 2018, Šunjić rejoined Dinamo Zagreb and signed a contract until 15 June 2023. However, at the same time, he moved to Lokomotiva on loan for the rest of the season.

=== Dinamo Zagreb ===
Šunjić returned to Dinamo Zagreb for the 2018–19 season and featured 41 times in all competitions. He made eight appearances in the Europa League, scoring in a 4–1 victory against Fenerbahçe on 20 September 2018 and starting in Dinamo Zagreb's impressive 1–0 first leg win against Benfica in the round of 16 of the Europa League on 7 March.

Šunjić was suspended for the second leg, in which Dinamo Zagreb were eliminated. He made 30 league appearances as Dinamo Zagreb finished as champions, and scored a 90th-minute goal in the Croatian Cup semifinal against Osijek that secured a 2–0 victory. Šunjić started in the final, which Dinamo Zagreb lost 3–1 to Rijeka.

=== Birmingham City ===
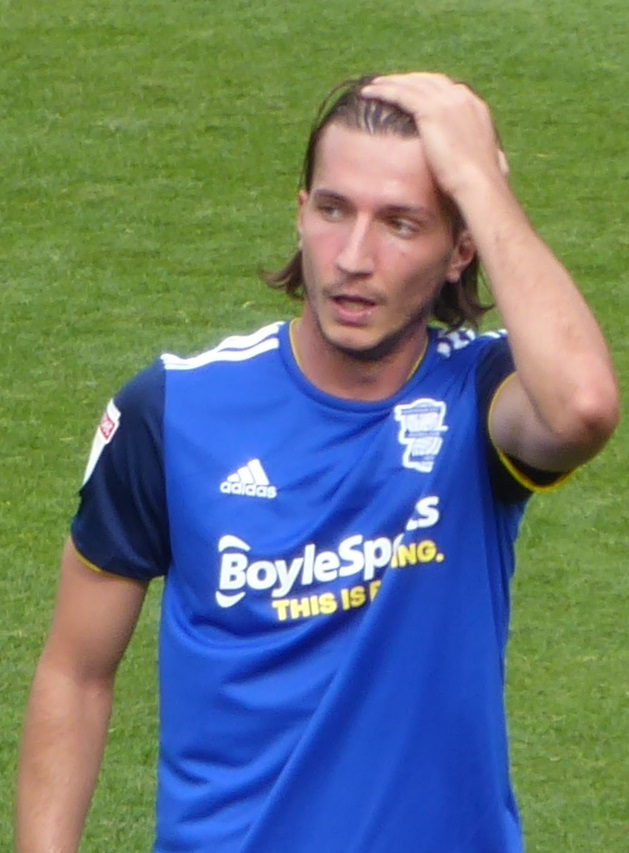
Šunjić with Birmingham City in 2019

On 26 July 2019, Šunjić signed a five-year contract with the Championship club Birmingham City. The officially undisclosed fee was reported as €7 million. He made his debut as a second-half substitute in Birmingham's opening fixture of the season, a 1–0 win away against Brentford on 3 August 2019. His "rasping rising 20-yard shot which flew into the net" to tie the scores away to Derby County won him the Championship Goal of the Month award for October, but Birmingham lost the match.

Three months later, the Birmingham Mail rated his performance at 9/10, describing him as "imposing and dynamic" and suggesting that "the destructive side of his game [had] gone up a level", Interviewed during the first COVID-19 lockdown, Šunjić felt satisfied by his season thus far, despite dips in form which he felt inevitable in a "fast, physical league" with many games, but admitted there were areas in which he could improve. He finished the season with 44 appearances, starting in 40 of them. Šunjić joined Bundesliga club Hertha Berlin on loan for the 2022–23 season.

Šunjić was a first team footballer during the 2023–24 season as Birmingham were relegated to the third tier for the first time in nearly 30 years. He was released at the end of the season.

=== Pafos ===
Šunjić signed for Cyprus First Division club Pafos on 1 August 2024. On 3 November 2025, Pafos announced that they had extended their contract with Šunjić until the summer of 2027.

== International career ==
=== Croatia ===
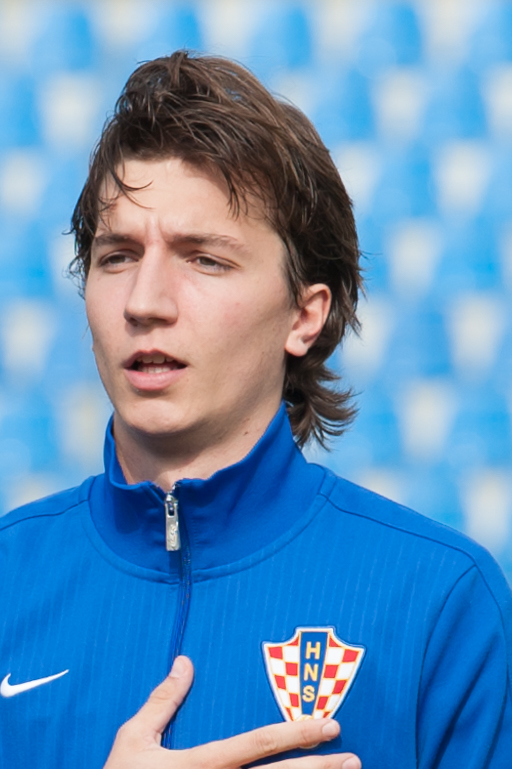
Šunjić with Croatia U19 in 2015

Šunjić was included in Croatia's squad for the 2013 Under-17 World Cup, and played all three group stage matches. He was called up to the senior national team in May 2017 for a friendly match against Mexico in the United States on 28 May.

Šunjić played the whole of the match, in which an inexperienced Croatia team comprising largely debutants and reduced to ten men secured a 2–1 victory against a relatively strong Mexican team. He later served as captain of Croatia under-21 at the 2019 UEFA European Under-21 Championship and played all three of their matches.

=== Bosnia and Herzegovina ===
After not being called up to the Croatia senior team, Šunjić opted to switch his FIFA nationality to Bosnia and Herzegovina, his country of birth. Sergej Barbarez called him up to the Bosnia and Herzegovina national team for Nations League A matches against Germany and the Netherlands in November 2024.

He made his debut on 16 November, starting in central midfield against Germany at Europa-Park Stadion, Freiburg, and played 74 minutes as Germany won 7–0, a Nations League record.

In June 2026, Šunjić was named in Bosnia and Herzegovina's squad for the 2026 FIFA World Cup. He made his tournament debut in the opening group match against Canada on 12 June.

== Personal life ==
Šunjić is in a relationship with Nikol Bulat since 2018. They have a son, born in May 2023.

== Career statistics ==
=== Club ===
As of match played 8 November 2026

Appearances and goals by club, season and competition
Club	Season	League			National cup (Note: Includes Croatian Cup, FA Cup, DFB-Pokal, Cypriot Cup)		League cup (Note: Includes EFL Cup)		Europe		Other		Total	
Club	Season	Division	Apps	Goals	Apps	Goals	Apps	Goals	Apps	Goals	Apps	Goals	Apps	Goals
Dinamo Zagreb	2013–14	Prva HNL	1	0	0	0	—		0	0	0	0	1	0
Dinamo Zagreb	2014–15	Prva HNL	0	0	0	0	—		0	0	—		0	0
Dinamo Zagreb	2015–16	Prva HNL	0	0	1	0	—		0	0	—		1	0
Dinamo Zagreb	Total		1	0	1	0	—		0	0	0	0	2	0
Dinamo Zagreb II	2014–15	Tréca HNL West	18	1	—		—		—		—		18	1
Dinamo Zagreb II	2015–16	Druga HNL	12	0	—		—		—		—		12	0
Dinamo Zagreb II	Total		30	1	—		—		—		—		30	1
Lokomotiva	2015–16	Prva HNL	10	0	—		—		—		—		10	0
Lokomotiva	2016–17	Prva HNL	23	1	1	0	—		6 (Note: Appearances in UEFA Europa League)	0	—		30	1
Lokomotiva	2017–18	Prva HNL	29	6	3	0	—		—		—		32	6
Lokomotiva	Total		62	7	4	0	—		6	0	—		72	7
Dinamo Zagreb	2018–19	Prva HNL	24	0	4	1	—		13 (Note: Five appearances in UEFA Champions League, eight appearances and one goal in UEFA Europa League)	1	—		41	2
Dinamo Zagreb	2019–20	Prva HNL	0	0	—		—		1 (Note: Appearance(s) in UEFA Champions League)	0	0	0	1	0
Dinamo Zagreb	Total		24	0	4	1	—		14	1	0	0	42	2
Birmingham City	2019–20	Championship	40	3	4	0	0	0	—		—		44	3
Birmingham City	2020–21	Championship	43	0	1	0	1	0	—		—		45	0
Birmingham City	2021–22	Championship	41	3	1	0	2	0	—		—		44	3
Birmingham City	2023–24	Championship	36	1	2	0	2	0	—		—		40	1
Birmingham City	Total		160	7	8	0	5	0	—		—		173	7
Hertha BSC (loan)	2022–23	Bundesliga	18	0	1	0	—		—		—		19	0
Pafos	2024–25	Cypriot First Division	32	4	5	0	—		14 (Note: Appearances in UEFA Europa Conference League)	0	1 (Note: Appearance in Cypriot Super Cup)	0	52	4
Pafos	2025–26	Cypriot First Division	29	4	4	0	—		13	0	—		46	4
Pafos	2026–27	Cypriot First Division	9	0	0	0	—		9 (Note: Four appearances in UEFA Europa League, five appearances in UEFA Conference League)	0	1	0	19	0
Pafos	Total		70	8	9	0	—		36	0	2	0	117	8
Career total			365	23	28	1	5	0	56	1	2	0	456	25

=== International ===
As of match played 2 October 2026

Appearances and goals by national team and year
National team	Year	Apps	Goals
Croatia	2017	1	0
Croatia	Total	1	0
Bosnia and Herzegovina	2024	2	0
Bosnia and Herzegovina	2025	7	0
Bosnia and Herzegovina	2026 (Note: Four appearances in the 2026 FIFA World Cup)	8	0
Bosnia and Herzegovina	Total	17	0
Career total		18	0

== Honours ==
Dinamo Zagreb

- Croatian First Football League: 2018–19

Pafos

- Cypriot First Division: 2024–25
- Cypriot Cup: 2025–26
- Cypriot Super Cup: 2026
