= Alexandre Brito =

Portuguese footballer (born 2005)

Personal information
- Full name: Alexandre Miguel Soares Carvalho Brito
- Date of birth: 19 July 2005 (age 21)
- Place of birth: Lisbon, Portugal
- Height: 1.90 m (6 ft 3 in)
- Position: Defensive midfielder

Team information
- Current team: Pafos
- Number: 50

Youth career
- 2014–2015: ACRD Carenque
- 2015–2017: SC Linda-a-Velha
- 2017–2025: Sporting CP

Senior career*
Years	Team	Apps	(Gls)
2023–2026	Sporting CP B	39	(2)
2025–2026	Sporting CP	2	(0)
2025–2026	→ Pafos (loan)	8	(1)
2026–	Pafos	1	(0)

International career^{‡}
2022	Portugal U18	4	(0)
- * Club domestic league appearances and goals as of 11 October 2026 ‡ National team caps and goals as of 20:39, 17 February 2025 (UTC)

Alexandre Miguel Soares Carvalho Brito (born 19 July 2005) is a Portuguese professional footballer who plays as a defensive midfielder for Cypriot First Division club Pafos.

== Career ==
Brito is a youth product of ACRD Carenque and SC Linda-a-Velha, before moving to the youth academy of Sporting CP in 2017. On 21 February 2022, he signed his first professional contract with Sporting, and was promoted to their reserves for the 2023–24 season. On 30 May 2024, he extended his contract with the club until 2027. On 13 November 2024, he started training with the senior Sporting squad for the first time. He made his senior and professional debut with Sporting as a substitute in a 2–2 Primeira Liga tie with Arouca on 15 February 2025.

On 20 July 2025, Brito was sent on a season-long loan to Cypriot First Division club Pafos.

On 1 July 2026, Brito signed a four-year contract with Cypriot First Division club Pafos.

== International career ==
Born in Portugal, Brito is of Cape Verdean descent. He was called up to the Portugal U18s for a set of friendlies in 2022.

== Career statistics ==
As of match played 15 October 2026

Appearances and goals by club, season and competition
Club	Season	League			National cup (Note: Includes Taça de Portugal, Cypriot Cup)		League Cup		Europe		Other		Total	
Club	Season	Division	Apps	Goals	Apps	Goals	Apps	Goals	Apps	Goals	Apps	Goals	Apps	Goals
Sporting CP B	2023–24	Liga 3	25	2	—		—		—		—		25	2
Sporting CP B	2024–25	Liga 3	13	0	—		—		—		—		13	0
Sporting CP B	Total		39	2	—		—		—		—		39	2
Sporting CP	2024–25	Primeira Liga	2	0	1	0	0	0	1 (Note: Appearance in UEFA Champions League)	0	—		4	0
Pafos (loan)	2025–26	Cypriot First Division	8	1	3	1	—		0	0	0	0	11	2
Pafos	2026–27	Cypriot First Division	1	0	0	0	—		5 (Note: Three appearances in UEFA Europa League, two appearances in UEFA Conference League)	0	0	0	6	0
Career total			50	3	4	1	0	0	6	0	0	0	60	4

== Honours ==
Pafos

- Cypriot Cup: 2025–26
- Cypriot Super Cup: 2026
