= Lelê (footballer, born 1997) =

Brazilian footballer (born 1997)

Personal information
- Full name: Leanderson da Silva Genésio
- Date of birth: 1 October 1997 (age 29)
- Place of birth: Rio de Janeiro, Brazil
- Height: 1.89 m (6 ft 2 in)
- Position: Forward

Team information
- Current team: Pafos (on loan from Fluminense)
- Number: 18

Senior career*
Years	Team	Apps	(Gls)
2018–2023	Itaboraí Profute	34	(17)
2020	→ Maricá (loan)	18	(6)
2021	→ Maricá (loan)	9	(5)
2022–2023	→ Volta Redonda (loan)	44	(22)
2023	→ Fluminense (loan)	29	(2)
2024–	Fluminense	14	(6)
2025	→ Ceará (loan)	7	(0)
2025	→ Nagoya Grampus (loan)	0	(0)
2025	→ Atlético Goianiense (loan)	17	(6)
2026–	→ Pafos (loan)	21	(7)
- * Club domestic league appearances and goals as of 10 November 2026

Leanderson da Silva Genésio (born 1 October 1997), commonly known as Lelê, is a Brazilian footballer who plays as a forward for Cypriot First Division club Pafos, on loan from Fluminense.

== Club career ==
Born in Rio de Janeiro, Lelê started his career with Itaboraí Profute, first appearing in the 2018 Campeonato Carioca Série C. After being the top scorer of the side in the following year, he was loaned to Maricá for the remainder of the Campeonato Carioca Série B1.

Lelê returned to Profute for the latter stages of the 2020 Campeonato Carioca Série B2, but rejoined Maricá for the 2021 season. On 20 December of that year, after helping Maricá to reach the Copa Rio finals and achieve a first-ever qualification to the Copa do Brasil, he joined Volta Redonda.

Lelê was regularly used for Voltaço during the 2022 campaign, winning both the Campeonato Carioca Série A2 and the Copa Rio. On 11 January 2023, his loan with Profute was renewed for a further year; Profute, however, confirm the extension of the loan until April.

On 28 February 2023, Série A side Fluminense announced the signing of Lelê on loan from Profute, with the player arriving at the club after the 2023 Campeonato Carioca. In his debut in the category on 15 April, he came on as a half-time substitute for Gabriel Pirani, assisted John Kennedy's second and scored the third goal in a 3–0 away win over América Mineiro.

== Career statistics ==
As of match played 15 October 2026

Club	Season	League			State League		Cup		Continental		Other		Total	
Club	Season	Division	Apps	Goals	Apps	Goals	Apps	Goals	Apps	Goals	Apps	Goals	Apps	Goals
Itaboraí Profute	2018	Carioca Série C	—		12	4	—		—		—		12	4
Itaboraí Profute	2019	Carioca Série B2	—		16	12	—		—		6 (Note: Appearance(s) in Copa Rio)	7	22	19
Itaboraí Profute	2020	Carioca Série B2	—		6	1	—		—		—		6	1
Itaboraí Profute	Total		—		34	17	—		—		6	7	40	24
Maricá (loan)	2020	Carioca Série B1	—		18	6	—		—		—		18	6
Maricá (loan)	2021	Carioca Série A2	—		9	5	—		—		9	4	18	9
Maricá (loan)	Total		—		27	11	—		—		9	4	36	15
Volta Redonda	2022	Série C	20	7	24	4	1	1	—		5	3	50	15
Volta Redonda	2023	Série C	0	0	13	13	2	1	—		—		15	14
Volta Redonda	Total		20	7	37	17	3	2	—		5	3	65	29
Fluminense (loan)	2023	Série A	29	2	—		—		8 (Note: Appearance(s) in Copa Libertadores)	0	—		37	2
Fluminense	2024	Série A	0	0	10	6	0	0	2	0	1 (Note: Appearance in Recopa Sudamericana)	0	13	6
Fluminense	2025	Série A	0	0	3	0	0	0	—		—		3	0
Fluminense	2026	Série A	0	0	1	0	0	0	0	0	—		1	0
Fluminense	Total		0	0	14	6	0	0	2	0	1	0	17	6
Ceará Sporting Club (loan)	2025	Série A	7	0	—		2	0	—		—		9	0
Atlético Goianiense (loan)	2025	Série B	17	6	—		—		—		—		17	6
Pafos (loan)	2025–26	Cypriot First Division	12	3	—		2	1	—		—		14	4
Pafos (loan)	2026–27	Cypriot First Division	5	2	—		0	0	7 (Note: Four appearances and one goal in UEFA Europa League, three appearances and one goal in UEFA Conference League)	2	1 (Note: Appearance in Cypriot Super Cup)	1	13	5
Pafos (loan)	Total		17	5	—		2	1	7	2	1	1	27	10
Career total			90	20	112	51	6	3	17	2	22	14	247	90

== Honours ==
Volta Redonda

- Campeonato Carioca Série A2: 2022
- Copa Rio: 2022

Fluminense

- Copa Libertadores: 2023

Pafos

- Cypriot Cup: 2025–26
- Cypriot Super Cup: 2026
