= Nikolas Ioannou =

Cypriot footballer

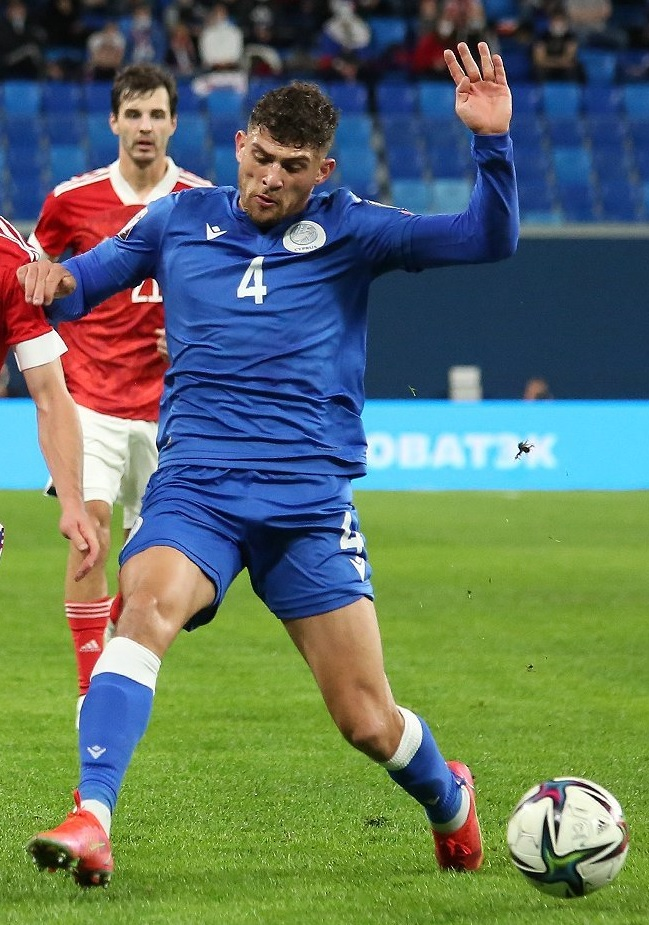
- Ioannou playing for Cyprus in 2021

Personal information
- Date of birth: 10 November 1995 (age 31)
- Place of birth: Limassol, Cyprus
- Height: 1.84 m (6 ft 0 in)
- Position: Left-back

Team information
- Current team: Pafos
- Number: 14

Youth career
- –2006: AEP Paphos
- 2006–2014: Manchester United

Senior career*
Years	Team	Apps	(Gls)
2014–2020	APOEL	81	(5)
2020–2022	Nottingham Forest	5	(0)
2021	→ Aris (loan)	9	(1)
2021–2022	→ Como (loan)	30	(1)
2022–2025	Como	57	(6)
2024–2025	→ Sampdoria (loan)	24	(2)
2025–2026	Sampdoria	18	(2)
2026–	Pafos	19	(2)

International career^{‡}
2012–2014	Cyprus U19	1	(0)
2014–2016	Cyprus U21	11	(1)
2017–	Cyprus	51	(2)
- * Club domestic league appearances and goals as of 11 October 2026 ‡ National team caps and goals as of 15 November 2024

Nikolas Ioannou (Greek: Νικόλας Ιωάννου; born 10 November 1995) is a Cypriot professional footballer who plays as a left-back for Cypriot First Division club Pafos and the Cyprus national team.

== Club career ==
=== Youth career ===
Ioannou joined the Manchester United youth academy at the age of 11. He played at the Marveld Tournament with the under-15 team in June 2010 held in the Netherlands. This was followed by his participation in the Manchester United Premier Cup. His form earned him a two-year scholarship in June 2012. But it is also reported that Manchester United was reluctant to give him a full-time contract. He made his debut at Old Trafford against Charlton Athletic in the FA Youth Cup, aged 16. While playing in the Milk Cup, he was injured which kept him out of action for most of the 2012–13 season. In his last match for the reserves, he captained the team against Tottenham Hotspur. He also appeared in three 2013–14 UEFA Youth League group stage matches with the under-19 team.

=== APOEL ===
After being released by United, he signed a three-year contract with APOEL on 24 April 2014. On joining the club, Ioannou commented: "My main aim is to win trophies of course, but obviously I need to start playing. APOEL play in big competitions – Champions League and Europa League – so hopefully I can get a few games."

He made his official debut against Finnish club HJK on 30 July 2014, in APOEL's 2–2 away draw for the third qualifying round of the 2014–15 UEFA Champions League. On 5 November 2014, aged 18, he made his first UEFA Champions League group stage appearance, playing the full 90 minutes in APOEL's 0–1 defeat against Paris Saint-Germain at Parc des Princes. In his first season at APOEL, Ioannou appeared only in seven matches in all competitions, but he managed to win the double, as his team won both the Cypriot championship and the cup.

On 3 June 2016, Ioannou signed a three-year contract extension until 31 May 2019, but a few months later, on 13 March 2017, he signed a further two-year contract extension with APOEL, running until 31 May 2021. Following his successful 2016–17 season with APOEL, Ioannou was awarded the "Young Player of the season" award by the Cypriot Football Association.

=== Nottingham Forest ===
On 25 September 2020, Ioannou returned to England, joining EFL Championship side Nottingham Forest for an undisclosed fee. He made his debut for Forest on 3 October 2020 in a 2–1 defeat to Bristol City.

On 8 January 2021, Ioannou was loaned to Greek Super League club, Aris until the end of the season.

On 5 July 2021, it was announced Ioannou had joined Serie B side Como on a season-long loan deal.

=== Como ===
On 27 July 2022, Ioannou later joined Como on a permanent deal, signing a three-year contract until June 2025.

=== Pafos ===
On 31 January 2026, Ioannou returned to Cyprus and signed a two-and-a-half-year contract with Pafos.

== International career ==
Being an English-Cypriot, Ioannou is eligible to represent the national teams of both the countries. In 2012, he had been capped by Cyprus U19. He made his Cyprus U21 debut on 5 September 2014, coming on as a 70th-minute substitute in a UEFA European U-21 Championship qualifying match against Belgium.

He received his first senior Cyprus national team call-up at the age of 18, being an unused substitute for Cyprus in the friendly match against Japan on 27 May 2014. He made his debut for Cyprus in 2017.

== Personal life ==
Ioannou's father Demetris Ioannou is a former Cypriot international captain. His elder brother is Michael Ioannou, who is a Cypriot youth international. He attended St George's RC High School in Walkden, Greater Manchester, during his time at the Manchester United academy.

== Career statistics ==
=== Club ===
As of match played 15 October 2026

Appearances and goals by club, season and competition
Club	Season	League			National cup (Note: Includes Cypriot Cup, Greek Football Cup, Coppa Italia)		Europe		Other		Total	
Club	Season	Division	Apps	Goals	Apps	Goals	Apps	Goals	Apps	Goals	Apps	Goals
APOEL	2014–15	Cypriot First Division	3	0	2	0	2 (Note: Appearances in UEFA Champions League)	0	0	0	7	0
APOEL	2015–16	Cypriot First Division	5	0	1	0	1	0	0	0	7	0
APOEL	2016–17	Cypriot First Division	17	0	6	0	4	0	1 (Note: Appearance in Cypriot Super Cup)	0	28	0
APOEL	2017–18	Cypriot First Division	10	1	3	0	0	0	0	0	13	1
APOEL	2018–19	Cypriot First Division	25	4	6	0	5 (Note: One appearance in UEFA Champions League, four appearances in UEFA Europa League)	0	0	0	36	4
APOEL	2019–20	Cypriot First Division	19	0	2	0	14 (Note: Six appearances in UEFA Champions League, four appearances and one goal in UEFA Europa League)	1	0	0	35	1
APOEL	2020–21	Cypriot First Division	2	0	—		1 (Note: Appearances in UEFA Europa League)	0	—		3	0
APOEL	Total		81	5	20	0	27	1	1	0	129	6
Nottingham Forest	2020–21	Championship	5	0	0	0	—		—		5	0
Aris	2020–21	Super League Greece	9	1	1	0	—		—		10	1
Como (loan)	2021–22	Serie B	30	1	1	0	—		—		31	1
Como	2022–23	Serie B	32	3	1	0	—		—		33	3
Como	2023–24	Serie B	25	3	1	0	—		—		26	3
Como	Total		57	6	2	0	—		—		60	6
Sampdoria (loan)	2024–25	Serie B	24	2	3	1	—		1 (Note: Appearance in Serie B play-offs)	0	28	3
Sampdoria	2025–26	Serie B	18	2	1	0	—		—		19	2
Pafos	2025–26	Cypriot First Division	16	2	3	0	—		—		19	2
Pafos	2026–27	Cypriot First Division	3	0	0	0	7 (Note: Four appearances in UEFA Europa League, three appearances and one goal in UEFA Conference League)	1	—		10	1
Pafos	Total		19	2	3	0	7	1	—		29	3
Career total			243	19	31	1	34	2	2	0	310	22

=== International ===
As of 15 November 2024

Appearances and goals by national team and year
National team	Year	Apps	Goals
Cyprus	2017	2	0
Cyprus	2018	7	0
Cyprus	2019	10	2
Cyprus	2020	3	0
Cyprus	2021	11	0
Cyprus	2022	8	0
Cyprus	2023	5	0
Cyprus	2024	5	0
Total		51	2

Scores and results list Cyprus goal tally first, score column indicates score after each Ioannou goal.

List of international goals scored by Nikolas Ioannou
No.	Date	Venue	Opponent	Score	Result	Competition
1	10 October 2019	Astana Arena, Nur-Sultan, Kazakhstan	Kazakhstan	2–1	2–1	UEFA Euro 2020 qualification
2	19 November 2019	King Baudouin Stadium, Brussels, Belgium	Belgium	1–0	1–6	UEFA Euro 2020 qualification

== Honours ==
APOEL

- Cypriot First Division: 2014–15, 2015–16, 2016–17, 2017–18, 2018–19
- Cypriot Cup: 2014–15
- Cypriot Super Cup: 2019

Pafos

- Cypriot Cup: 2025–26
- Cypriot Super Cup: 2026

Individual

- Young player of the Season (Cyprus): 2016–17
