= Wilmer Odefalk =

Swedish footballer (born 2004)

Personal information
- Full name: Carl Peter Wilmer Odefalk
- Date of birth: 21 November 2004 (age 21)
- Height: 1.77 m (5 ft 10 in)
- Position: Midfielder

Team information
- Current team: IF Brommapojkarna

Youth career
- IFK Stocksund
- 2014–2015: IF Brommapojkarna
- 2016–2018: FC Djursholm
- 2019–2021: IF Brommapojkarna

Senior career*
Years	Team	Apps	(Gls)
2021–2022	IF Brommapojkarna	28	(1)
2023	Djurgårdens IF	1	(0)
2023–	IF Brommapojkarna	61	(5)
2025–2026	→ Pafos (loan)	13	(1)

International career^{‡}
2022–2023	Sweden U19	12	(1)
2024–2025	Sweden U21	6	(0)
- * Club domestic league appearances and goals as of 10:26, 4 June 2026 (UTC) ‡ National team caps and goals as of 09:46, 21 June 2025 (UTC)

Wilmer Odefalk (born 21 November 2004) is a Swedish footballer who plays as a midfielder for IF Brommapojkarna.

== Club career ==
Odefalk started his youth career in IFK Stocksund and joined IF Brommapojkarna at the age of ten. He left after two years, but came back in 2019 and made his senior debut against Tyresö in the 2021–22 Svenska Cupen. He made his league debut in October 2021; though the team languished in the 2021 Ettan, they managed two straight promotions, first to the 2022 Superettan and from there to the 2023 Allsvenskan.

By that time, Odefalk had attracted interest from the big three Stockholm clubs, as well as IFK Göteborg and possibly teams abroad. Odefalk eventually signed for Djurgårdens IF. Odefalk was presented as a new signing the day before Theo and Lucas Bergvall, all three being teenagers transferring between the same clubs. Djurgården scout Peter Kisfaludy described Odefalk as "slippery like an eel's skin" and "wise like a poodle".

Odefalk made his Allsvenskan debut in May 2023, but only as a substitute playing one minute. He did not find his place in the Djurgården squad and Brommapojkarna bought him back in July 2023. Here he became an Allsvenskan regular.

On 3 September 2025, Odefalk joined Cypriot First Division side Pafos on loan.

== International career ==
Odefalk was called up to Sweden U21 for the first time in June 2024, having played on the youth national teams since Sweden U18.

== Career statistics ==
=== Club ===
As of match played 22 May 2026

Appearances and goals by club, season and competition
Club	Season	League			National cup		Europe		Other		Total	
Club	Season	Division	Apps	Goals	Apps	Goals	Apps	Goals	Apps	Goals	Apps	Goals
IF Brommapojkarna	2021	Ettan Fotboll	1	0	0	0	—		—		1	0
IF Brommapojkarna	2022	Superettan	27	1	2	1	—		—		29	2
IF Brommapojkarna	Total		28	1	2	1	—		—		30	2
Djurgårdens IF	2023	Allsvenskan	1	0	0	0	—		—		1	0
IF Brommapojkarna	2023	Allsvenskan	13	1	1	1	—		2 (Note: Appearances in relegation play-offs)	0	16	2
IF Brommapojkarna	2024	Allsvenskan	28	3	4	1	—		—		32	4
IF Brommapojkarna	2025	Allsvenskan	20	1	4	0	—		—		24	1
IF Brommapojkarna	Total		61	5	9	2	—		—		70	7
Pafos (loan)	2025–26	Cypriot First Division	13	1	0	0	0	0	1 (Note: Appearance in Cypriot Super Cup)	0	14	1
Career total			103	7	11	3	0	0	3	0	117	10

== Honours ==
Pafos

- Cypriot Cup: 2025–26
