= Domingos Quina =

Footballer (born 1999)

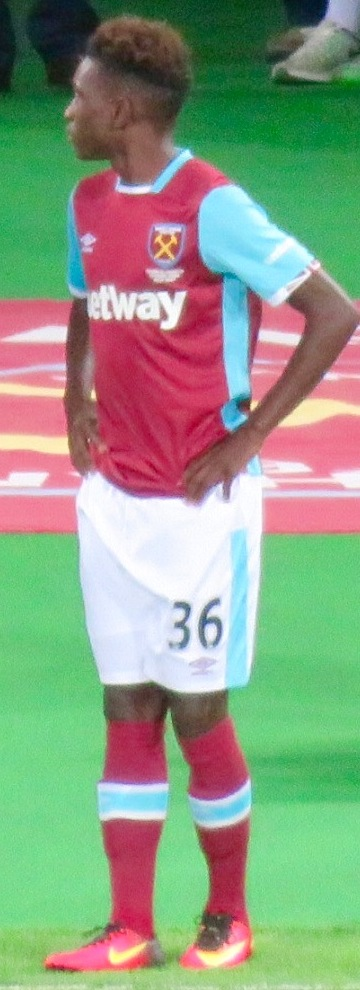
- Quina with West Ham United in 2016

Personal information
- Full name: Domingos Quina
- Date of birth: 18 November 1999 (age 26)
- Place of birth: Bissau, Guinea-Bissau
- Height: 1.79 m (5 ft 10 in)
- Position: Midfielder

Team information
- Current team: Pafos
- Number: 8

Youth career
- –2012: Benfica
- 2012–2016: Chelsea
- 2016: West Ham United

Senior career*
Years	Team	Apps	(Gls)
2016–2018	West Ham United	0	(0)
2018–2023	Watford	26	(2)
2021	→ Granada (loan)	8	(2)
2021	→ Fulham (loan)	2	(0)
2022	→ Barnsley (loan)	16	(2)
2022–2023	→ Elche (loan)	10	(0)
2023	→ Rotherham United (loan)	8	(0)
2023–2024	Udinese	2	(0)
2024	→ Vizela (loan)	13	(0)
2024–	Pafos	62	(9)

International career
2015–2016	Portugal U17	14	(8)
2016	Portugal U18	3	(0)
2016–2018	Portugal U19	21	(2)
2017–2019	Portugal U20	11	(1)
2019	Portugal U21	3	(0)
Medal record
Men's football
Representing Portugal
UEFA European Under-19 Championship
Winner	2018 Finland
Runner-up	2017 Georgia
UEFA European U17 Championship
Winner	2016 Azerbaijan
- * Club domestic league appearances and goals as of 19:03, 11 October 2026 (UTC)

Domingos Quina (born 18 November 1999) is a professional footballer who plays as a midfielder for Cypriot First Division club Pafos. Born in Guinea-Bissau, he has represented Portugal internationally at various youth levels.

Quina is the son of former Portugal international defender Samuel Quina.

== Club career ==
=== West Ham United ===
Having spent time at the academies of Benfica and Chelsea, he was offered a contract by Arsenal, but Quina decided to sign for West Ham United in May 2016 with the expectation that he would join the squad in July 2016 and sign a professional contract on his 17th birthday in November 2016. He made his debut, coming on as an 81st-minute substitute for Michail Antonio, against NK Domzale in the Europa League on 28 July 2016 and also played a part in the second leg in a 3–0 win in the club's first ever match at London Stadium. On 3 October 2016, Quina scored a widely praised goal for West Ham Under-23s, by scoring a chip from near the halfway line against Leicester City's Under-23 side.

Having turned 17, Quina signed his first professional contract with West Ham in November 2016 which could keep him at the club until 2019. In the same year, he received two nominations for Premier League 2 Player of the Month for October, merited for his performances against Aston Villa, Middlesbrough and West Bromwich Albion respectively. His performances for West Ham Under-23s saw Sky Sports describe Quina as a "wonderkid".

=== Watford ===
On 9 August 2018, Quina signed for Watford on a four-year contract for an undisclosed fee, believed to be £1 million. He made his Watford debut on 29 August in a second round EFL Cup game away to Reading. With Watford already leading 1–0, Quina scored with a driving shot, described as "superb", from 30 yards to make to score 2–0, the final result. He made his Premier League debut for the club on 4 December 2018 coming as a substitute in a 2–1 home loss against Manchester City and his first league start in the following match, on 10 December 2018, in a 2–2 away draw against Everton. On 15 December, he became the youngest Watford player to score in the Premier League, in a match against Cardiff City.

==== Loan spells ====
On 1 February 2021, Quina joined La Liga side Granada on loan until the end of the season.

On 31 August 2021, Quina joined recently relegated Championship side Fulham on a season-long loan deal with the club holding the option to make the deal permanent.

On 1 February 2022, Quina joined Championship side Barnsley on loan for the remainder of the 2021–22 season. He scored his first goal for the club against Queens Park Rangers on 12 February 2022. The loan was terminated on 26 April 2022 after Barnsley were relegated.

On 16 August 2022, Quina returned to Spain and its top tier after agreeing to a one-year loan deal with Elche. The deal was cut short on transfer deadline day, 31 January 2023, and Quina immediately moved to fellow Championship side Rotherham United on loan until the end of the 2022–23 season.

=== Udinese ===
On 1 July 2023, Quina joined Italian Serie A club Udinese for an undisclosed fee.

On 29 January 2024, Udinese sent Quina on loan to Primeira Liga club Vizela until the end of the 2023–24 season.

=== Pafos ===
On 3 September 2024, Quina signed with Pafos in Cyprus.

== International career ==
Having moved to Portugal as a young child, Quina has represented that nation at the under-17, under-18, under-19 and under-20 levels. He won the UEFA European Under-17 Championship with Portugal in May 2016. In July 2018, he was a member of the U19 team which won the UEFA European Under-19 Championship beating Italy U19 4–3 after extra time.

== Career statistics ==
As of match played 15 October 2026

Appearances and goals by club, season and competition
Club	Season	League			National cup (Note: Includes FA Cup, Copa del Rey, Coppa Italia, Taça de Portugal, Cypriot Cup)		League cup (Note: Includes EFL Cup)		Europe		Other		Total	
Club	Season	Division	Apps	Goals	Apps	Goals	Apps	Goals	Apps	Goals	Apps	Goals	Apps	Goals
West Ham U-23s	2016–17	Premier League 2	—		—		—		—		1 (Note: Appearance(s) in EFL Trophy)	0	1	0
West Ham U-23s	2017–18	Premier League 2	—		—		—		—		4	0	4	0
West Ham U-23s	Total		—		—		—		—		5	0	5	0
West Ham United	2016–17	Premier League	0	0	0	0	0	0	2 (Note: Appearances in UEFA Europa League)	0	—		2	0
West Ham United	2017–18	Premier League	0	0	1	0	3	0	—		—		4	0
West Ham United	Total		0	0	1	0	3	0	2	0	—		6	0
Watford	2018–19	Premier League	8	1	3	0	2	1	—		—		13	2
Watford	2019–20	Premier League	4	0	2	0	3	0	—		—		9	0
Watford	2020–21	Championship	14	1	0	0	1	0	—		—		15	1
Watford	2021–22	Premier League	0	0	0	0	0	0	—		—		0	0
Watford	2022–23	Championship	0	0	0	0	0	0	—		—		0	0
Watford	Total		26	2	5	0	6	1	—		—		37	3
Granada (loan)	2020–21	La liga	8	2	0	0	—		—		—		8	2
Fulham (loan)	2021–22	Championship	2	0	1	0	1	0	—		—		4	0
Barnsley (loan)	2021–22	Championship	16	2	0	0	—		—		—		16	2
Elche (loan)	2022–23	La Liga	10	0	1	0	—		—		—		11	0
Rotherham United (loan)	2022–23	Championship	8	0	—		—		—		—		8	0
Udinese	2023–24	Serie A	2	0	1	0	—		—		—		3	0
Vizela (loan)	2023–24	Primeira Liga	13	0	1	0	—		—		—		14	0
Pafos	2024–25	Cypriot First Division	25	2	3	0	—		7 (Note: Appearances in UEFA Conference League)	0	0	0	35	2
Pafos	2025–26	Cypriot First Division	31	6	3	0	—		11 (Note: Appearances in UEFA Champions League)	0	1 (Note: Appearance in Cypriot Super Cup)	1	46	7
Pafos	2026–27	Cypriot First Division	4	0	0	0	—		6 (Note: Three appearances in UEFA Europa League, three appearances and one goal in UEFA Conference League)	1	1	0	11	1
Pafos	Total		60	8	6	0	—		24	1	2	1	92	10
Career total			155	14	16	0	10	1	26	1	7	1	204	17

== Honours ==
Pafos

- Cypriot First Division: 2024–25
- Cypriot Cup: 2025–26
- Cypriot Super Cup: 2026

Portugal U17

- UEFA European Under-17 Championship: 2016

Portugal U19

- UEFA European Under-19 Championship: 2018

Individual

- 2016 UEFA European Under-17 Championship Team of the Tournament
- UEFA European Under-19 Championship Team of the Tournament: 2018
