= Derrick Luckassen =

Ghanaian footballer (born 1995)

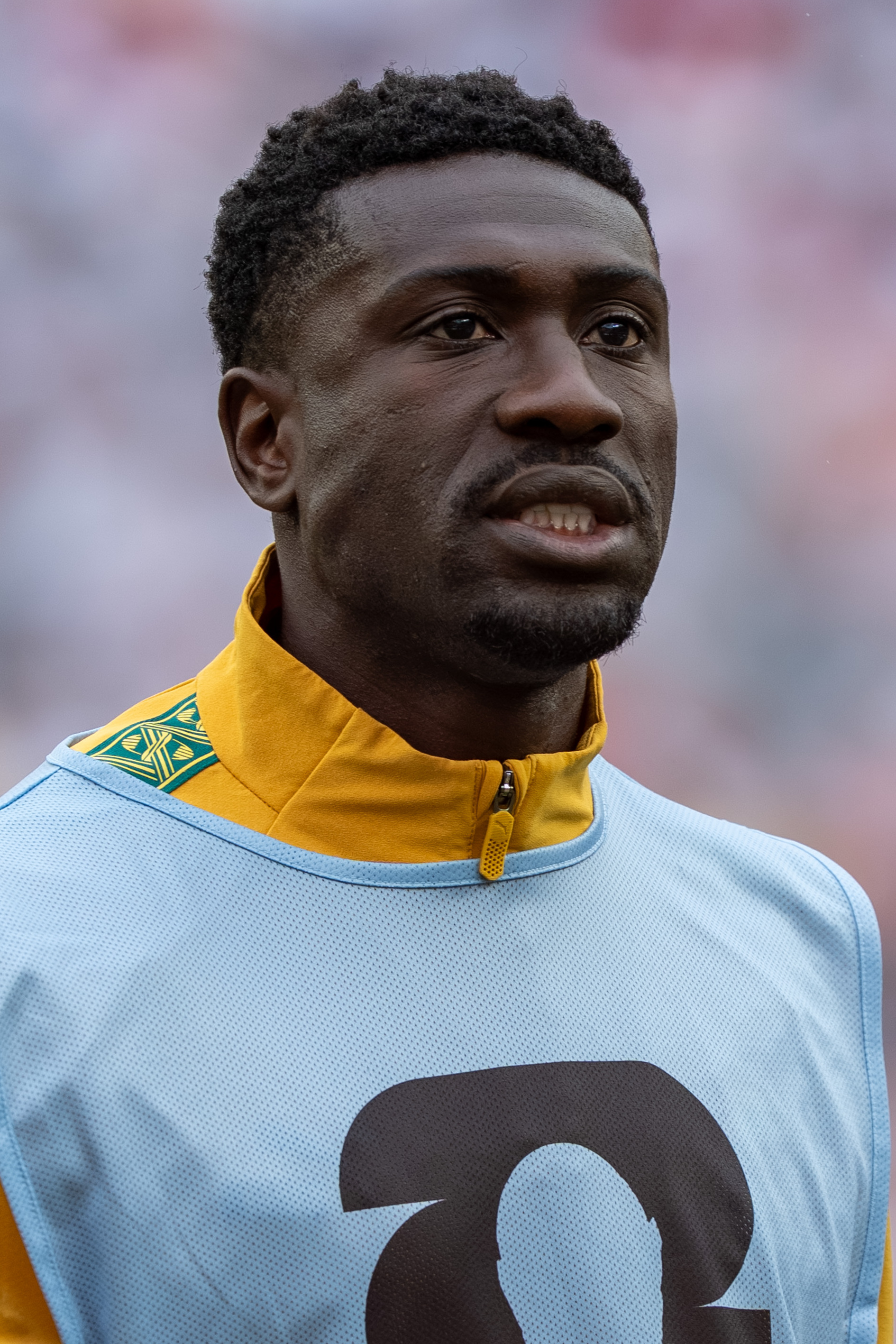
- Luckassen with Ghana in 2026

Personal information
- Date of birth: 3 July 1995 (age 31)
- Place of birth: Amsterdam, Netherlands
- Height: 1.86 m (6 ft 1 in)
- Position: Centre-back

Team information
- Current team: Red Star Belgrade
- Number: 32

Youth career
- –2014: AZ

Senior career*
Years	Team	Apps	(Gls)
2014–2017	AZ	69	(5)
2017–2022	PSV	19	(0)
2018–2019	→ Hertha BSC (loan)	4	(0)
2019–2021	→ Anderlecht (loan)	26	(0)
2021	→ Kasımpaşa (loan)	16	(0)
2021–2022	→ Fatih Karagümrük (loan)	20	(0)
2022–2024	Maccabi Tel Aviv	39	(0)
2024–2026	Pafos	55	(7)
2026–	Red Star Belgrade	5	(0)

International career^{‡}
2012	Netherlands U18	2	(0)
2013–2014	Netherlands U19	6	(0)
2014	Netherlands U20	2	(0)
2014–2016	Netherlands U21	9	(1)
2026–	Ghana	3	(1)
- * Club domestic league appearances and goals as of 23:16, 8 November 2026 (UTC) ‡ National team caps and goals as of 4 July 2026

Derrick Luckassen (born 3 July 1995) is a professional footballer who plays as a centre-back for Serbian club Red Star Belgrade. Born in the Netherlands, he plays for the Ghana national team.

== Club career ==
=== AZ ===
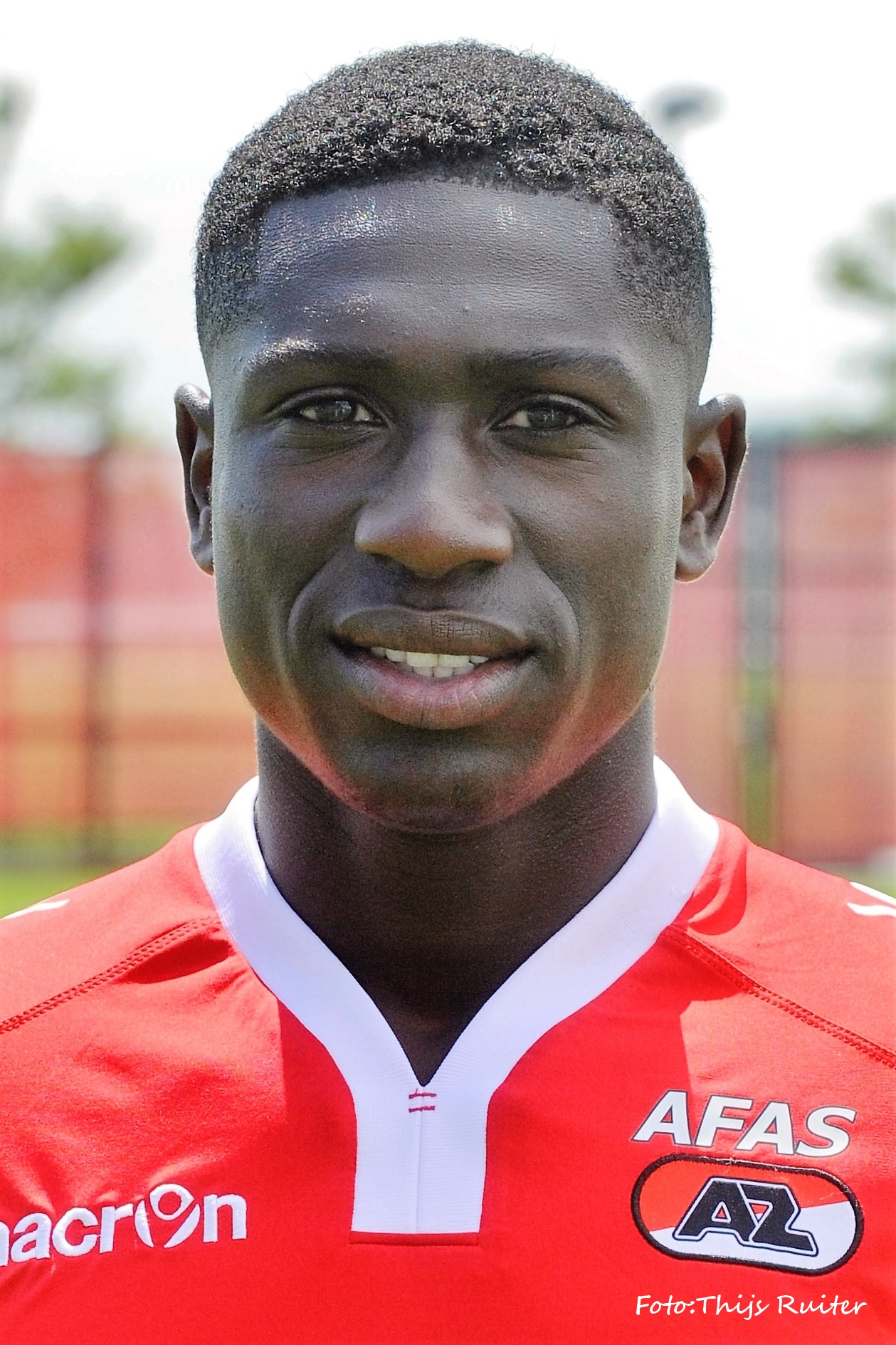
Luckassen with AZ in 2014

Luckassen is a graduate of the AZ youth academy. He captained the youth team during the 2013–14 campaign. On 29 August 2014, he signed a professional contract with the club, keeping him there until 2018.

Luckassen made his professional debut for the club against Dordrecht. He first played a whole match against Twente.

=== PSV Eindhoven ===
On 10 July 2017, Luckassen moved to league rivals PSV on a five-year deal until 2022.

He came off the bench on 15 April 2018 as PSV beat rivals Ajax 3–0 to clinch the 2017–18 Eredivisie title.

==== Loan to Hertha Berlin ====
On 28 August 2018, Luckassen moved to Bundesliga side Hertha BSC on a season-long loan for the season.

==== Loan to Anderlecht ====
On 31 August 19, Luckassen was loaned to Belgium side Anderlecht on a season-long loan. On 6 June 2020, PSV Eindhoven agreed to loan Luckassen to Anderlecht for another season.

==== Loan to Kasımpaşa ====
On 11 January 2021, due to a lack of playing time Luckassen ended his loan at Anderlecht, and moved to Turkish club, Kasımpaşa, on loan until the end of June.

==== Loan to Fatih Karagümrük ====
On 9 June 2021, he returned to Turkey on a new loan, joining Fatih Karagümrük.

=== Maccabi Tel Aviv ===
Luckassen was signed by Israeli Premier League club Maccabi Tel Aviv in the summer of 2022 and played for the club through the 2023–24 season, helping the club win the league title as well as the Toto Cup that season.

=== Pafos ===
On 20 July 2024, Cypriot First Division club Pafos announced the signing of Luckassen from Maccabi Tel Aviv. He was part of the Pafos side that won the club's first Cypriot league title during the 2024–25 season.

On 5 November 2025, Luckassen helped Pafos to their first ever win in the UEFA Champions League proper as they stunned La Liga side Villarreal. Luckassen scored the historic winner with a header following a corner from winger Ken Sema.

=== Red Star Belgrade ===
On 24 July 2026, Serbian club Red Star Belgrade signed Luckassen.

== International career ==
Luckassen was born in the Netherlands to parents of Ghanaian descent, and has represented the Netherlands at youth level.

In March 2026, Luckassen was called up by Ghana for their friendly matches against Austria and Germany.

Luckassen was named in the Ghana squad for the 2026 FIFA World Cup on 2 June 2026 after being called up as a replacement for the injured Alexander Djiku. Later that month, on 27 June, he scored his first international goal in a 2–1 defeat against Croatia on his World Cup debut.

== Personal life ==
Luckassen is the brother of Kevin Brobbey, who like Derrick, started his professional career at AZ Alkmaar. Brian Brobbey is his half-brother.

== Career statistics ==
=== Club ===
As of match played 10 October 2026

Club	Season	League			National cup (Note: Includes KNVB Cup, Belgian Cup, Turkish Cup, Israel State Cup, Cypriot Cup)		League cup (Note: Includes Toto Cup)		Continental		Other		Total	
Club	Season	Division	Apps	Goals	Apps	Goals	Apps	Goals	Apps	Goals	Apps	Goals	Apps	Goals
AZ	2014–15	Eredivisie	13	1	1	0	—		—		—		14	1
AZ	2015–16	Eredivisie	21	1	3	0	—		7 (Note: Appearances in UEFA Europa League)	0	—		31	1
AZ	2016–17	Eredivisie	35	3	5	1	—		12	2	—		52	6
AZ	Total		69	5	9	1	—		19	2	—		97	8
PSV	2017–18	Eredivisie	19	0	2	1	—		1	0	—		22	1
PSV	2018–19	Eredivisie	0	0	0	0	—		0	0	—		0	0
PSV	2019–20	Eredivisie	0	0	0	0	—		2 (Note: Appearances in UEFA Champions League)	0	1 (Note: Appearance in Johan Cruyff Shield)	0	3	0
PSV	Total		19	0	2	1	—		3	0	1	0	25	1
Hertha (loan)	2018–19	Bundesliga	4	0	0	0	—		—		—		4	0
Anderlecht (loan)	2019–20	Belgian Pro League	18	0	3	1	—		—		—		21	1
Anderlecht (loan)	2020–21	Belgian Pro League	8	0	0	0	—		—		—		8	0
Anderlecht (loan)	Total		26	0	3	1	—		—		—		29	1
Kasımpaşa (loan)	2020–21	Süper Lig	16	0	1	0	—		—		—		17	0
Fatih Karagümrük (loan)	2021–22	Süper Lig	20	0	1	1	—		—		—		21	1
Maccabi Tel Aviv	2022–23	Israeli Premier League	24	0	4	0	1	0	—		—		29	0
Maccabi Tel Aviv	2023–24	Israeli Premier League	15	0	1	0	3	0	7 (Note: Appearances in UEFA Conference League)	1	—		26	1
Maccabi Tel Aviv	Total		39	0	5	0	4	0	7	1	—		55	1
Pafos	2024–25	Cypriot First Division	27	2	3	0	—		15	1	1 (Note: Appearance in Cypriot Super Cup)	0	46	3
Pafos	2025–26	Cypriot First Division	28	5	3	0	—		14	1	1	0	46	6
Pafos	Total		55	7	6	0	—		29	2	2	0	92	9
Red Star Belgrade	2026–27	Serbian SuperLiga	4	0	0	0	—		3 (Note: One appearance in UEFA Champions League, two appearances in UEFA Europa League)	0	—		7	0
Career total			252	12	27	4	4	0	61	5	3	0	347	21

=== International ===
As of match played 3 July 2026

Appearances and goals by national team and year
National team	Year	Apps	Goals
Ghana	2026	3	1
Total		3	1

Scores and results list Ghana's goal tally first, score column indicates score after each Luckassen goal.

List of international goals scored by Derrick Luckassen
No.	Date	Venue	Cap	Opponent	Score	Result	Competition
1	27 June 2026	Lincoln Financial Field, Philadelphia, United States	2	Croatia	1–1	1–2	2026 FIFA World Cup

== Honours ==
PSV

- Johan Cruyff Shield: 2022

Maccabi Tel Aviv

- Israeli Premier League: 2023–24
- Toto Cup: 2023–24

Pafos

- Cypriot First Division: 2024–25
- Cypriot Cup: 2025–26
