= Jay Gorter =

Dutch footballer (born 2000)

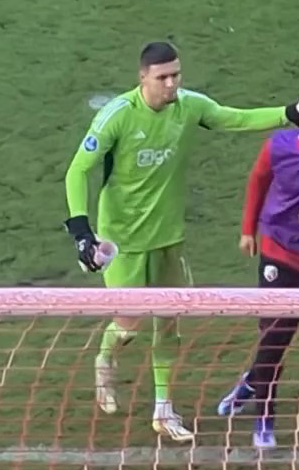
- Gorter playing for Ajax in 2023

Personal information
- Date of birth: 30 May 2000 (age 26)
- Place of birth: Amsterdam, Netherlands
- Height: 1.90 m (6 ft 3 in)
- Position: Goalkeeper

Team information
- Current team: Pafos
- Number: 1

Youth career
- –2010: FC Purmerend
- 2010–2014: Ajax
- 2014–2015: AFC
- 2015–2018: AZ
- 2018–2019: Go Ahead Eagles

Senior career*
Years	Team	Apps	(Gls)
2019–2021	Go Ahead Eagles	37	(0)
2021–2025	Ajax	9	(0)
2021–2025	Jong Ajax	18	(0)
2023	→ Aberdeen (loan)	4	(0)
2025–	Pafos	16	(0)

International career^{‡}
2022–2023	Netherlands U21	2	(0)
- * Club domestic league appearances and goals as of 22 May 2026 ‡ National team caps and goals as of 25 March 2023

Jay Gorter (born 30 May 2000) is a Dutch professional footballer who plays as a goalkeeper for Cypriot First Division club Pafos.

== Career ==
=== Go Ahead Eagles ===
Born in Amsterdam, Gorter played youth football for FC Purmerend (until 2010), Ajax (2010–2014), Amsterdamsche FC (2014–2015) and AZ Alkmaar (2015–2018) before joining Go Ahead Eagles in 2018. He made his debut for the club on 29 October 2019 in a 3–1 win at fellow Eerste Divisie club Almere City FC. On 16 December 2019, he signed his first professional contract with the club, lasting for two-and-a-half years. However, following behavioral problems with staff and fellow players, he was demoted to the under-19 team. Gorter made 40 appearances across the 2020–21 season in all competitions and kept 25 league clean sheets, a league record, as Go Ahead Eagles were promoted to the Eredivisie.

=== Ajax ===
On 12 June 2021, it was announced that Gorter would join AFC Ajax on a four-year contract, effective from 1 July 2021. Mainly appearing for Jong Ajax in the second division, he made his first-team debut for Ajax on 22 January 2022 in a KNVB Cup game against Excelsior Maassluis.

For the 2022 Johan Cruyff Shield on 30 July 2022, Gorter was chosen as a starter in favour of the experienced Remko Pasveer, who had been struggling with injuries during pre-season. He was criticised for his involvement in two goals conceded while Ajax lost the match 5–3.

On 31 January 2023, Gorter signed for Scottish Premiership club Aberdeen on loan until the end of the season.

=== Pafos ===
On 23 July 2025, Gorter left Ajax to sign a three-year contract with Cypriot First Division club Pafos.

== International career ==
Gorter played twice for the Netherlands national under-21 football team.

== Career statistics ==
As of match played 22 May 2026

Appearances and goals by club, season and competition
Club	Season	League			National cup (Note: Includes KNVB Cup)		Continental		Other		Total	
Club	Season	Division	Apps	Goals	Apps	Goals	Apps	Goals	Apps	Goals	Apps	Goals
Go Ahead Eagles	2019–20	Eerste Divisie	0	0	3	0	—		0	0	3	0
Go Ahead Eagles	2020–21	Eerste Divisie	37	0	3	0	—		0	0	40	0
Go Ahead Eagles	Total		37	0	6	0	—		0	0	43	0
Ajax	2021–22	Eredivisie	1	0	1	0	0	0	0	0	2	0
Ajax	2022–23	Eredivisie	0	0	0	0	0	0	1 (Note: Appearances in Johan Cruijff Shield)	0	1	0
Ajax	2023–24	Eredivisie	8	0	0	0	4 (Note: Appearances in UEFA Europa League)	0	—		12	0
Ajax	2024–25	Eredivisie	0	0	0	0	1	0	—		1	0
Ajax	Total		9	0	1	0	5	0	1	0	16	0
Jong Ajax	2021–22	Eerste Divisie	18	0	—		—		—		18	0
Aberdeen (loan)	2022–23	Scottish Premiership	4	0	0	0	—		0	0	4	0
Pafos	2025–26	Cypriot First Division	16	0	2	0	2 (Note: Appearances in UEFA Champions League)	0	—		20	0
Career total			84	0	9	0	7	0	1	0	101	0

== Honours ==
Pafos

- Cypriot Cup: 2025–26
- Cypriot Super Cup: 2026
