= Athanasios Papadoudis =

Greek footballer

Personal information
- Full name: Athanasios Theologos Papadoudis
- Date of birth: 6 September 2003 (age 23)
- Place of birth: Greece
- Height: 1.95 m (6 ft 5 in)
- Position: Goalkeeper

Team information
- Current team: Riga FC
- Number: 31

Youth career
- Olympiacos

Senior career*
Years	Team	Apps	(Gls)
2021–2024	Olympiacos B	43	(0)
2022–2024	Olympiacos	0	(0)
2024–2026	Pafos	5	(0)
2026–	Riga FC	0	(0)

International career^{‡}
2019	Greece U19	2	(0)
- * Club domestic league appearances and goals as of 14:51, 4 June 2026 (UTC) ‡ National team caps and goals as of 18:26, 27 September 2025 (UTC)

Athanasios Papadoudis (Greek: Αθανάσιος Παπαδούδης; born 6 September 2003) is a Greek professional footballer who plays as a goalkeeper for Virslīga club Riga FC.

== Club career ==
Papadoudis' early senior career saw him join Olympiacos B on September 1, 2021, transferring from the Olympiacos U19 squad where he had progressed since joining the Olympiacos U17 team in 2019.

During his time with the Olympiacos organization, he played 43 matches for the B team, primarily in the Super League 2. He transferred to the main Olympiacos club on July 19, 2022. During the 2023/2024 season, while with Olympiacos, he was part of the squad that won the UEFA Conference League.

Papadoudis then moved to Cypriot First Division club Pafos FC on a free transfer on August 6, 2024. He played a part in Pafos FC securing the Cypriot First Division title during the 2024/2025 season. His current contract with Pafos FC runs until May 31, 2026.

== International career ==
Athanasios Papadoudis has represented Greece at the youth international level. He is listed as a former international for Greece U16 and has also made 2 appearances for the Greece U19 national team.

== Career statistics ==
As of match played on 11 February 2026

Appearances and goals by club, season and competition
Club	Season	League			National cup		Europe		Other		Total	
Club	Season	Division	Apps	Goals	Apps	Goals	Apps	Goals	Apps	Goals	Apps	Goals
Olympiacos B	2021–22	Super League Greece 2	1	0	—		—		—		1	0
Olympiacos B	2022–23	Super League Greece 2	14	0	—		—		—		14	0
Olympiacos B	2023–24	Super League Greece 2	28	0	—		—		—		28	0
Olympiacos B	Total		43	0	—		—		—		43	0
Olympiacos	2022–23	Super League Greece	0	0	0	0	0	0	0	0	0	0
Olympiacos	2023–24	Super League Greece	0	0	0	0	0	0	0	0	0	0
Olympiacos	Total		0	0	0	0	0	0	0	0	0	0
Pafos	2024–25	Cypriot First Division	1	0	0	0	—		0	0	1	0
Pafos	2025–26	Cypriot First Division	4	0	1	0	0	0	—		4	0
Pafos	Total		5	0	1	0	0	0	0	0	5	0
Career total			48	0	1	0	0	0	0	0	48	0

== Honours ==
Olympiacos

- UEFA Conference League: 2023–24

Pafos

- Cypriot First Division: 2024–25
- Cypriot Cup: 2025–26
