= Mons Bassouamina =

Congolese footballer (born 1998)

Personal information
- Full name: Mons Rogeani André Bassouamina
- Date of birth: 28 May 1998 (age 28)
- Place of birth: Gonesse, France
- Height: 1.72 m (5 ft 8 in)
- Position: Forward

Team information
- Current team: Marítimo
- Number: 12

Youth career
- 2006–2008: ESM Le Thillay Vaud'Herland
- 2010–2013: AAS Sarcelles
- 2013–2018: Nancy

Senior career*
Years	Team	Apps	(Gls)
2015–2020	Nancy II	67	(20)
2018–2021	Nancy	12	(0)
2019	→ Boulogne (loan)	14	(1)
2021–2022	Bastia-Borgo	32	(9)
2022–2024	Pau	68	(17)
2024–2025	Clermont	32	(5)
2025–2026	Pafos	15	(1)
2026–	Marítimo	0	(0)

International career^{‡}
2015–2016	France U18	5	(0)
2022–	Congo	13	(3)
- * Club domestic league appearances and goals as of 22 May 2026 ‡ National team caps and goals as of 22:35, 19 November 2024 (UTC)

Mons Rogeani André Bassouamina (born 28 May 1998) is a professional footballer who plays as a forward for Primeira Liga club Marítimo. Born in France, he plays for the Congo national team.

== Club career ==
In January 2019, Bassouamina was loaned to Boulogne from Nancy.

In June 2022, Bassouamina signed for Ligue 2 side Pau.

In July 2024, Bassouamina joined Clermont on a three-year contract.

In July 2025, Bassouamina signed a two-year contract with Cypriot First Division side Pafos.

In September 2026, Bassouamina signed an one-season contract with Marítimo.

== International career ==
Born in France, Bassouamina is of Congolese descent. He is a youth international for France. He was called up to represent the Congo national team for a set of friendlies in March 2022. He debuted with the Congo in a friendly 3–1 loss to Zambia on 25 March 2022.

== Career statistics ==
=== Club ===
As of match played on 22 May 2026

Appearances and goals by club, season and competition
Club	Season	League			National cup		League cup		Continental		Other		Total	
Club	Season	Division	Apps	Goals	Apps	Goals	Apps	Goals	Apps	Goals	Apps	Goals	Apps	Goals
Nancy	2018–19	Ligue 2	11	0	0	0	2	2	—		—		13	2
Nancy	2019–20	Ligue 2	1	0	0	0	0	0	—		—		1	0
Nancy	2020–21	Ligue 2	0	0	1	0	0	0	—		—		1	0
Nancy	Total		12	0	1	0	2	2	—		—		15	2
Boulogne (loan)	2018–19	Championnat National	14	1	—		—		—		—		14	1
Bastia-Borgo	2021–22	Championnat National	32	9	3	2	—		—		—		35	11
Pau	2022–23	Ligue 2	34	6	3	2	—		—		—		37	8
Pau	2023–24	Ligue 2	34	11	1	0	—		—		—		35	11
Pau	Total		68	17	4	2	—		—		—		72	19
Clermont	2024–25	Ligue 2	32	5	1	0	—		—		—		33	5
Pafos	2025–26	Cypriot First Division	15	1	2	0	—		10 (Note: Appearances in UEFA Champions League)	1	0	0	27	2
Career total			173	33	11	4	2	2	10	1	0	0	196	40

=== International ===
As of match played 19 November 2024

Appearances and goals by national team and year
National team	Year	Apps	Goals
Congo	2022	1	0
Congo	2023	4	1
Congo	2024	8	2
Total		13	3

Scores and results list Congo's goal tally first, score column indicates score after each Bassouamina goal.

List of international goals scored by Mons Bassouamina
No.	Date	Venue	Opponent	Score	Result	Competition
1	17 November 2023	Levy Mwanawasa Stadium, Ndola, Zambia	Zambia	2–1	2–4	2026 FIFA World Cup qualification
2	25 March 2024	Stade Walter-Luzi, Chambly, France	Gabon	1–1	1–1	Friendly
3	15 October 2024	Stade Alphonse Massemba-Débat, Brazzaville, Republic of the Congo	South Africa	1–1	1–1	2025 Africa Cup of Nations qualification

== Honours ==
Pafos

- Cypriot Cup: 2025–26
