= Axel Guessand =

French footballer (born 2004)

Personal information
- Full name: Axel Thurel Sahuye Guessand
- Date of birth: 6 November 2004 (age 22)
- Place of birth: Schiltigheim, France
- Height: 1.92 m (6 ft 4 in)
- Position: Defender

Team information
- Current team: Kalamata
- Number: 44

Youth career
- 2010–2015: AS Strasbourg
- 2015–2017: ASPV Strasbourg
- 2017–2018: Schiltigheim
- 2018–2022: Nancy
- 2022–2025: Udinese

Senior career*
Years	Team	Apps	(Gls)
2021–2022	Nancy II	9	(2)
2021–2022	Nancy	2	(0)
2022–2025	Udinese	2	(0)
2024	→ Volendam (loan)	2	(0)
2025	Kristiansund	5	(0)
2025–2026	Pafos	10	(0)
2026–	Kalamata	1	(0)

International career
2021	France U18	2	(0)
- * Club domestic league appearances and goals as of 22 August 2026

Axel Thurel Sahuye Guessand (born 6 November 2004) is a French professional footballer who plays as a defender for Super League Greece club Kalamata.

== Club career ==
Guessand is a youth academy graduate of Nancy. He made his professional debut for the club on 28 August 2021, in a 4–1 league defeat against Auxerre. At the age of 16 years, 9 months and 22 days, he became the youngest player to ever feature in a professional match for Nancy.

On 1 July 2022, Guessand joined Serie A club Udinese on a three-year deal. He made his first-team debut on 4 June 2023, starting in a 1–0 league loss against Juventus. In January 2024, he joined Eredivisie club Volendam on loan for the remainder of the season.

On 4 March 2025, Guessand signed with Kristiansund in Norway until the end of 2027. On 8 September 2025, Kristiansund announced that Guessand had left the club during the summer after his contract was terminated.

On 2 October 2025, Pafos announced the signing of Guessand.

On 2 August 2026, Guessand signed for Kalamata on a free transfer.

== International career ==
Guessand is a French youth international.

== Personal life ==
Born in France, Guessand is of Ivorian descent. He is the younger brother of the footballer Evann Guessand.

== Career statistics ==
=== Club ===
As of match played 22 May 2026

Appearances and goals by club, season and competition
Club	Season	League			Cup		Continental		Total	
Club	Season	Division	Apps	Goals	Apps	Goals	Apps	Goals	Apps	Goals
Nancy	2021–22	Ligue 2	2	0	0	0	—		2	0
Udinese	2022–23	Serie A	1	0	0	0	—		1	0
Udinese	2023–24	Serie A	1	0	2	1	—		3	1
Udinese	Total		2	0	2	1	—		4	1
Volendam	2023–24	Eredivisie	2	0	0	0	—		2	0
Kristiansund	2025	Eliteserien	5	0	4	1	—		9	1
Pafos	2025–26	Cypriot First Division	10	0	2	0	0	0	12	0
Career total			21	0	8	2	0	0	29	2

== Honours ==
Pafos

- Cypriot Cup: 2025–26
