= Pedrão (footballer, born 2004) =

Brazilian footballer

Personal information
- Full name: Pedro Henrique Franklim da Silva
- Date of birth: 6 January 2004 (age 22)
- Place of birth: Barra Mansa, Brazil
- Height: 1.86 m (6 ft 1 in)
- Position: Centre-back

Team information
- Current team: Avaí
- Number: 35

Youth career
- Volta Redonda
- 2018–2022: Cruzeiro

Senior career*
Years	Team	Apps	(Gls)
2022–2026	Cruzeiro	2	(0)
2024–2025	→ Avaí (loan)	19	(0)
2025–	→ Pafos (loan)	1	(0)
2026–	Avaí	2	(0)
- * Club domestic league appearances and goals as of 18 November 2026

Pedro Henrique Franklim da Silva (born 6 January 2004), commonly known as Pedrão, is a Brazilian professional footballer who plays as a centre-back for Avaí.

== Club career ==
A youth product of Volta Redonda, Pedrão joined the youth academy of Cruzeiro in 2018 at the age of 13 where he finished his development. He made his senior and professional debut with Cruzeiro in a 2–1 Campeonato Brasileiro Série B win over Operário Ferroviário on 4 June 2022. On 20 June 2023, he extended his contract with Cruzeiro until 2025. On 27 September 2024, he again extended his contract with the club until December 2026. Pedrão joined Avaí on loan 20 December 2024, making 20 appearances with them and helping them win the 2025 Campeonato Catarinense. On 18 July 2025, his loan with Avaí was cut short and he moved the Cypriot First Division club Pafos on loan with an option to buy for the 2025–26 season.

== Honours ==
Cruzeiro

- Campeonato Brasileiro Série B: 2022

Avaí

- Campeonato Catarinense: 2025

Pafos

- Cypriot Cup: 2025–26
