= 2025–26 Cypriot Cup =

83rd edition of the Cypriot Cup

2025–26 Cyprus Coca-Cola Cup

Tournament details
- Country: Cyprus
- Dates: 1 October 2025 – 29 May 2026
- Teams: 28

Final positions
- Champions: Pafos FC (2nd title)
- Runners-up: Apollon Limassol

Tournament statistics
- Matches played: 27
- Goals scored: 89 (3.3 per match)

The 2025–26 Cypriot Cup was the 84th edition of the Cypriot Cup. It is contested by 28 teams from the Cypriot First and Second Division. It began on 1 October 2025 and the final will take place at the GSP Stadium in Nicosia.

The defending champions are AEK Larnaca, having won their third title in the previous edition. They lost to Omonoia in the second round and thus couldn't defend their title.

== Format ==
The tournament begins with 22 teams entering the first round; four teams receive a bye to the second round. In the first round, the ties are one-legged, and First Division clubs are drawn against Second Division clubs.

The second round is contested by 16 teams: the ones which qualified from the first round, and those which were exempt from the first round. The ties in the second round are one-legged, and from this point onwards, there are no restrictions on the draws. The ties in the quarter-finals are also one-legged. The semi-finals are the only round of the tournament, where the ties will be two-legged.

The final is contested in a single game, and will take place at the GSP Stadium. The winners qualify for the first qualifying round of the 2026–27 UEFA Europa League.

If, in any round, a winner is not determined after 90 minutes, the two teams play extra time. If a winner is still not determined after extra time, a penalty shootout takes place. There is no away goals rule.

== First round ==
The draw for the first round took place on 18 September 2025. The previous season's cup finalists (AEK Larnaca and Pafos), 2025–26 UEFA Conference League qualifiers Omonia, and one club from the 2025–26 Cypriot Second Division (Digenis Akritas Morphou) received a bye.

Team 1	Score	Team 2
1 October 2025
Ethnikos Latsion (2)	1–2 (a.e.t.)	AEL Limassol (1)
Akritas Chlorakas (1)	5–2	Doxa Katokopia (2)
Krasava ENY Ypsonas (1)	1–1 (a.e.t.) (1–3 p)	Nea Salamis Famagusta (2)
22 October 2025
Enosis Neon Paralimni (1)	2–0	Chalkanoras Idaliou (2)
Aris Limassol (1)	2–1	Omonia 29M (2)
APOEL (1)	5–0	AEZ Zakakiou (2)
29 October 2025
Achyronas-Onisilos (2)	0–2	APEA Akrotiri (2)
MEAP Nisou (2)	1–5	Apollon Limassol (1)
5 November 2025
Omonia Aradippou (1)	4–0	Ayia Napa (2)
ASIL Lysi (2)	0–2	Olympiakos Nicosia (1)
3 December 2025
Spartakos Kitiou (2)	0–4	Ethnikos Achnas (1)
Karmiotissa Pano Polemidia (2)	1–3	Anorthosis Famagusta (1)

== Second round ==
The draw for the second round took place on 3 December 2025.

Team 1	Score	Team 2
7 January 2026
APOEL (1)	1–0	APEA Akrotiri (2)
Pafos (1)	2–1	Akritas Chlorakas (1)
Ethnikos Achnas (1)	1–2	Enosis Neon Paralimni (1)
8 January 2026
Olympiakos Nicosia (1)	3–4 (a.e.t.)	Omonia Aradippou (1)
14 January 2026
Apollon Limassol (1)	2–0	Anorthosis Famagusta (1)
Omonia (1)	2–1	AEK Larnaca (1)
21 January 2026
Nea Salamis Famagusta (2)	2–2 (a.e.t.) (3–4 p)	Digenis Akritas Morphou (2)
Aris Limassol (1)	0–1	AEL Limassol (1)

== Quarter-finals ==
The eight second round winners entered the quarter-finals. The draw took place on 23rd January 2026.

Team 1	Score	Team 2
4 February 2026
Apollon Limassol (1)	3–2 (a.e.t.)	Omonia Aradippou (1)
Omonia (1)	1–2 (a.e.t.)	AEL Limassol (1)
11 February 2026
Digenis Akritas Morphou (2)	0–3	Pafos (1)
APOEL (1)	3–2	Enosis Neon Paralimni (1)

== Semi-finals ==
The four quarter-final winners entered the semi-finals, held over two legs.

Team 1	Agg.	Team 2	1st leg	2nd leg
AEL Limassol (1)	2–5	Pafos (1)	1–2	1–3
Apollon Limassol (1)	4–2	APOEL (1)	4–2	0–0

== Final ==
The final was held between the two semi-final winners.

29 May 2026
19:00

Apollon Limassol	0−2	Pafos
		Jajá 85'; Pêpê 90+2'

GSP Stadium, Nicosia
Referee: Marco Guida (Italy)
