= 2026–27 Pafos FC season =

Pafos
2026–27 season
- Owner: Pavel Gognidze
- Manager: Ricardo Sá Pinto
- Stadium: Stelios Kyriakides Stadium
- Cypriot First Division: Pre-season
- Cypriot Cup: Pre-season
- Cypriot Super Cup: Final
- UEFA Europa League: Third qualifying round vs Red Bull Salzburg
- UEFA Conference League: Playoff round
- Top goalscorer: League: All: Biel Teixeira (2)
Home colours	Away colours

The 2026–27 season is Pafos's 13th year in existence, and tenth season in the Cypriot First Division.

== Season review ==
On 2 June, Pafos announced the signing of Charalampos Kyriakidis from Omonia, on a contract until the summer of 2028.

On 15 June, Pafos announced the signing of Murad Mammadov from Neftçi, on a contract until June 2030.

On 27 June, Pafos announced that they had extended their loan agreement with Fluminense for Lelê, until the end of the season.

On 29 June, Pafos announced the signing of Guga from Al-Najma, on a contract until June 2029.

On 1 July, Pafos announced the permanent signing of Alexandre Brito from Sporting CP, on a contract until 30 June 2030.

On 2 July, Pafos announced the season-long loan signing of Biel Teixeira from Sporting CP.

On 9 July, Pafos announced the signing of Michalis Papastylianou from PAC Omonia 29M to a one-year contract.

On 12 July, Pafos announced the season-long loan signing of Samy Mmaee from Dinamo Zagreb, with a view to making the move permanent.

On 17 July, Pafos announced the season-long loan signing of Radosław Majecki from AS Monaco, with a view to making the move permanent.

On 3 August, Pafos announced the signing of free-agent Moumi Ngamaleu, who'd most recently played for Dynamo Moscow, on a contract until the summer of 2028.

On 25 August, Pafos announced the season-long loan signing of Yoram Zague from Paris Saint-Germain.

On 4 September, Pafos announced that Mons Bassouamina had left the club to sign for Marítimo, and that they had signed Afonso Patrão from Westerlo on a contract until June 2030.

On 9 September, Pafos announced the signing of Jónatas Noro from Braga, on a contract until the summer of 2029.

== Squad ==
As of match played 8 November 2026

No.	Name	Nationality	Position	Date of birth (age)	Signed from	Signed in	Contract ends	Apps.	Goals
Goalkeepers
1	Jay Gorter	(Netherlands)	GK	30 May 2003 (age 23)	AFC Ajax	2025	2028	21	0
71	Michalis Papastylianou	(Cyprus)	GK	22 January 1998 (age 28)	PAC Omonia 29M	2026	2027	0	0
82	Petros Petrou	(Cyprus)	GK	10 August 2006 (age 20)	Academy	2025		0	0
98	Charalampos Kyriakidis	(Cyprus)	GK	30 November 1998 (age 27)	Omonia	2026	2028	0	0
99	Radosław Majecki	(Poland)	GK	16 November 1999 (age 26)	on loan from AS Monaco	2026	2027	19	0
Defenders
2	Yoram Zague	(France)	DF	15 May 2006 (age 20)	on loan from Paris Saint-Germain	2026	2027	8	1
3	Samy Mmaee	(Morocco)	DF	8 September 1996 (age 30)	on loan from Dinamo Zagreb	2026	2027	12	0
4	David Luiz	(Brazil)	DF	22 April 1987 (age 39)	Unattached	2025	2027	54	6
5	David Goldar	(Spain)	DF	15 September 1994 (age 32)	Burgos	2023		120	13
14	Nikolas Ioannou	(Cyprus)	DF	10 November 1995 (age 30)	Sampdoria	2026	2028	37	3
23	Jónatas Noro	(Portugal)	DF	9 July 2005 (age 21)	Braga	2026	2029	2	1
72	Kosmas Ioannou	(Cyprus)	DF	29 January 2007 (age 19)	Academy	2026		1	0
77	João Correia (Note: João Correia was born in Portugal, but qualified to represent Cape Verde, making his debut in 2022.)	(Cape Verde)	DF	5 September 1996 (age 30)	Chaves	2024	2028	96	23
Midfielders
6	Guga	(Portugal)	MF	18 July 1997 (age 29)	Al-Najma	2026	2029	19	1
8	Domingos Quina (Note: Domingos Quina was born in Guinea-Bissau, but qualified to represent Portugal, representing them at youth level between 2015 and 2019.)	(Portugal)	MF	18 November 1999 (age 26)	Udinese	2024		98	11
12	Ken Sema	(Sweden)	MF	30 September 1993 (age 33)	Unattached	2024		75	1
20	Biel Teixeira	(Brazil)	MF	1 April 2001 (age 25)	on loan from Sporting CP	2026	2027	12	4
26	Ivan Šunjić	(Bosnia and Herzegovina)	MF	9 October 1996 (age 30)	Unattached	2024	2027	116	8
30	Vlad Dragomir	(Romania)	MF	24 April 1999 (age 27)	Virtus Entella	2021		223	26
47	Murad Mammadov	(Azerbaijan)	MF	26 April 2006 (age 20)	Neftçi	2026	2030	6	1
50	Alexandre Brito	(Portugal)	MF	19 July 2005 (age 21)	Sporting CP	2026	2030	23	2
60	Christos Efzona	(Cyprus)	MF	21 April 2005 (age 21)	Academy	2026		1	0
81	George Kolotas	(Cyprus)	MF	15 March 2006 (age 20)	Academy	2024		0	0
88	Pêpê	(Portugal)	MF	20 May 1997 (age 29)	Olympiacos	2024		153	10
Forwards
7	Bruno Felipe	(Brazil)	FW	26 May 1994 (age 32)	Omonia	2023	2027	167	12
11	Jajá	(Brazil)	FW	15 April 2001 (age 25)	Athletico Paranaense	2024	2028	116	20
13	Moumi Ngamaleu	(Cameroon)	FW	9 July 1994 (age 32)	Unattached	2026	2028	8	2
17	Afonso Patrão	(Portugal)	FW	3 February 2007 (age 19)	Westerlo	2026	2030	4	0
18	Lelê	(Brazil)	FW	1 October 1997 (age 29)	on loan from Fluminense	2026	2027	33	13
33	Anderson Silva	(Brazil)	FW	21 November 1997 (age 28)	Alanyaspor	2025	2028	123	35
42	Georgios Michael	(Cyprus)	FW	24 November 2008 (age 17)	Academy	2026		2	0
61	Melinos Kais	(Cyprus)	FW	30 April 2010 (age 16)	Academy	2026		1	0
87	Pedro Caldieraro	(Brazil)	FW	16 August 2005 (age 21)	Hercílio Luz	2023		1	0
Out on loan
10	Landry Dimata (Note: Landry Dimata was born in DR Congo, but qualified to represent Belgium, representing them at youth level between 2013 and 2019.)	(Belgium)	FW	1 September 1997 (age 29)	Samsunspor	2025		22	1
80	Christos Evzonas	(Cyprus)	MF	21 April 2005 (age 21)	Academy	2024	2027	0	0
Left during the season
9	Mons Bassouamina (Note: Mons Bassouamina was born in France, but qualified to represent Congo, making his debut in 2022.)	(Republic of the Congo)	FW	28 May 1998 (age 28)	Clermont	2025	2027	26	3
19	Axel Guessand	(France)	DF	6 November 2004 (age 22)	Unattached	2025		12	0
23	Derrick Luckassen (Note: Derrick Luckassen was born in Netherlands, but qualified to represent Ghana, making his debut in March 2026.)	(Ghana)	DF	3 July 1995 (age 31)	Maccabi Tel Aviv	2024		92	7

== Transfers ==
=== In ===
Date	Position	Nationality	Name	From	Fee	Ref.
2 June 2026	GK	(Cyprus)	Charalampos Kyriakidis	Omonia	Undisclosed	
15 June 2026	MF	(Azerbaijan)	Murad Mammadov	Neftçi	Undisclosed	
29 June 2026	MF	(Portugal)	Guga	Al-Najma	Undisclosed	
1 July 2026	MF	(Portugal)	Alexandre Brito	Sporting CP	Undisclosed	
9 July 2026	GK	(Cyprus)	Michalis Papastylianou	PAC Omonia 29M	Undisclosed	
3 August 2026	FW	(Cameroon)	Moumi Ngamaleu	Unattached	Free	
4 September 2026	FW	(Portugal)	Afonso Patrão	Westerlo	Undisclosed	
9 September 2026	DF	(Portugal)	Jónatas Noro	Braga	Undisclosed	

=== Loans in ===
Start date	Position	Nationality	Name	From	End date	Ref.
31 January 2026	FW	(Brazil)	Lelê	Fluminense	30 June 2027	
2 July 2026	MF	(Brazil)	Biel Teixeira	Sporting CP	30 June 2027	
12 July 2026	DF	(Morocco)	Samy Mmaee	Dinamo Zagreb	30 June 2027	
17 July 2026	GK	(Poland)	Radosław Majecki	AS Monaco	30 June 2027	
25 August 2026	DF	(France)	Yoram Zague	Paris Saint-Germain	30 June 2027	

=== Out ===
Date	Position	Nationality	Name	To	Fee	Ref.
24 July 2026	DF	(Ghana)	Derrick Luckassen	Red Star Belgrade	Undisclosed	
2 August 2026	DF	(France)	Axel Guessand	Kalamata	Undisclosed	
4 September 2026	FW	(Republic of the Congo)	Mons Bassouamina	Marítimo	Undisclosed	

== Friendlies ==
3 July 2026	Pafos	2–1	Cracovia	Waidring, Austria
18:00 EEST (UTC+3)	Brito; Biel	Report	Goal

8 July 2026	Pafos	0–0	Jablonec	Waidring, Austria
19:00 EEST (UTC+3)		Report

12 July 2026	Pafos	0–1	Jagiellonia Białystok	Waidring, Austria
18:00 EEST (UTC+3)		Report

16 July 2026	Pafos	3–2	Slovan Bratislava	Bratislava, Slovakia
EEST (UTC+3)		Report

== Competitions ==
=== Overview ===
Competition	First match	Last match	Starting round	Final position	Record							
Competition	First match	Last match	Starting round	Final position	Pld	W	D	L	GF	GA	GD	Win %
Cypriot First Division	30 August 2026		Matchday 1		9	4	4	1	13	7	+6	44.44
Cypriot Cup			Second round		0	0	0	0	0	0	+0	—
Super Cup	3 September 2026	3 September 2026	Final	Winners	1	1	0	0	1	0	+1	100.00
UEFA Europa League	23 July 2026	13 August 2026	Second qualifying round	Third qualifying round	4	1	1	2	7	6	+1	25.00
UEFA Conference League	20 August 2026		Playoff round		5	1	2	2	8	10	−2	20.00
Total					19	7	7	5	29	23	+6	36.84

Last updated: 8 November 2026
Source: Competitions

=== Super Cup ===
3 September 2026	Omonia	0–1	Pafos	Limassol
19:30 EEST (UTC+3)	Simić (yellow card) 32'; Balkovec (yellow card) 64'; Duverne (yellow card) 76'; Coulibaly (yellow card) 90+3'; Ewandro (yellow card) 90+5'	Report	Dragomir (yellow card) 8'; Ioannou (yellow card) 15'; Ngamaleu (yellow card) 60'; Lelê 74' (yellow card) 82'; Šunjić (yellow card) 90+2'	Stadium: Alphamega Stadium; Referee: Ioannis Christodoulou

=== Cypriot First Division ===
==== Regular season ====
===== League table =====
Pos	Team	Pld	W	D	L	GF	GA	GD	Pts	Qualification or relegation
4	APOEL	9	5	2	2	21	11	+10	17	Qualification for the Championship round
5	Apollon Limassol	9	4	4	1	21	11	+10	16	Qualification for the Championship round
6	Pafos	9	4	4	1	13	7	+6	16	Qualification for the Championship round
7	Aris Limassol	9	4	3	2	13	13	0	15	Qualification for the Relegation round
8	Omonia 29M	9	3	2	4	15	17	−2	11	Qualification for the Relegation round

Updated to match(es) played on 8 November 2026. Source: Soccerway
Rules for classification: 1) Points; 2) Head-to-head points; 3) Head-to-head goal difference; 4) Head-to-head goals scored; 5) Head-to-head away goals scored (only if two teams); 6) Goal difference; 7) Goals scored; 8) Play-off (only if deciding championship round, relegation round or relegation).

===== Results summary =====
Overall								Home						Away					
Pld	W	D	L	GF	GA	GD	Pts	W	D	L	GF	GA	GD	W	D	L	GF	GA	GD
9	4	4	1	13	7	+6	16	1	2	1	4	4	0	3	2	0	9	3	+6

Last updated: 8 November 2026.
Source: Results

===== Results by results =====
Matchday	1	2	3	4	5	6	7	8	9
Ground	A	H	A	H	A	H	A	A	H
Result	W	D	W	L	W	D	D	D	W
Position	1	4	1	4	3	5	5	7	6

Updated to match(es) played on 8 November 2026. Source: Results
A = Away; H = Home; W = Win; D = Draw; L = Loss; P = Postponed
Notes:
- ^{1} Matchday 1 postponed due to European participation.

===== Results =====
30 August 2026 1	Karmiotissa	0–3	Pafos	Paphos
20:00 EEST (UTC+3)		Report	Quina 45'; Ngamaleu 49'; Anderson 60'	Stadium: Stelios Kyriakides Stadium; Referee: Michalis Louka

7 September 2026 2	Pafos	0–0	Olympiakos Nicosia	Paphos
19:00 EEST (UTC+3)	Sema (yellow card) 64'	Report	Tamás (yellow card) 37'; Paz (yellow card) 83'	Stadium: Stelios Kyriakides Stadium; Referee: Theodoros Sofokleous

13 September 2026 3	AEK Larnaca	0–1	Pafos	Larnaca
19:00 EEST (UTC+3)	Miramón (yellow card) 90+2'	Report	Quina (yellow card) 12'; Šunjić (yellow card) 32'; Dragomir 62'	Stadium: AEK Arena; Referee: Menelaos Antoniou

18 September 2026 4	Pafos	0–2	AEL Limassol	Paphos
20:00 EEST (UTC+3)	Ioannou (yellow card) 35'; Bruno (yellow card) 42'; Lelê (yellow card) 70'; Guga (yellow card) 90+2'	Report	Mughe 46'; Singh 53'; Tavares (yellow card) 71'	Stadium: Stelios Kyriakides Stadium; Referee: Marios Christoforou

11 October 2026 5	Anorthosis Famagusta	1–3	Pafos	Larnaca
18:00 EEST (UTC+3)	da Cruz 42'; Chrysostomou (yellow card) 74'; Thandi (yellow card) 81'	Report	Šunjić (yellow card) 35'; Zague 46'; Lelê 48', 57'; Luiz (yellow card) 56'	Stadium: Antonis Papadopoulos Stadium; Referee: Menelaos Antoniou

19 October 2026 6	Pafos	0–0	APOEL	Paphos
18:00 EEST (UTC+3)	Dragomir (yellow card) 7'; Quina (yellow card) 71'; Mmaee (yellow card) 74'	Report	Dálcio (yellow card) 54'	Stadium: Stelios Kyriakides Stadium; Referee: Chrysovalantis Theouli

26 October 2026 7	Nea Salamis Famagusta	0–0	Pafos	Larnaca
18:00 EET (UTC+2)	Gerolemou (yellow card) 81'	Report	Correia (yellow card) 63'; Quina (yellow card) 90+4'	Stadium: Ammochostos Epistrofi Stadium; Referee: Konstantinos Fellas

31 October 2026 8	Apollon Limassol	2–2	Pafos	Limassol
17:00 EET (UTC+2)	Brown (yellow card) 1'; Ožbolt 36'; Brandon 67'	Report	Lelê 29'; Brito (yellow card) 39'; Šunjić (yellow card) 44'; Ioannou (yellow card) 45+4'; Correia (yellow card) 45+4'; Sema (yellow card) 73'; Anderson 88' (pen.); Luiz (yellow card) 90+2'	Stadium: Alphamega Stadium; Referee: Menelaos Antoniou

8 November 2026 9	Pafos	4–2	PAC Omonia 29M	Paphos
19:00 EET (UTC+2)	Noro 24'; Lelê 27'; Mmaee (yellow card) 32'; Anderson 45'; Dragomir 47'; Correia (yellow card) 68'	Report	Antoniou (yellow card) 17'; Ambri (yellow card) 32' (goal) 87'; Črnigoj 54' (yellow card) 58'	Stadium: Stelios Kyriakides Stadium; Referee: Konstantinos Neofytou

21 November 2026 10	Omonia Aradippou	–	Pafos	Aradippou
16:00 EET (UTC+2)				Stadium: Antonis Papadopoulos Stadium

=== Cypriot Cup ===
2026	–
EEST (UTC+3)

=== UEFA Europa League ===
==== Qualifying phase ====
23 July 2026 Second qualifying round 1st leg	Hajduk Split (Croatia)	2–0	(Cyprus) Pafos	Split, Croatia
22:00 EEST (UTC+3)	Pajaziti (yellow card) 4'; Šego 56'; Melnjak 64'; Huram (yellow card) 87' del Moral (yellow card) 88'	Report	Ioannou (yellow card) 55'; Brito (yellow card) 63'	Stadium: Stadion Poljud; Attendance: 27,752; Referee: Rob Harvey (Republic of Ireland)

30 July 2026 Second qualifying round 2nd leg	Pafos (Cyprus)	4–0 (4–2 agg.)	(Croatia) Hajduk Split	Limassol, Cyprus
20:00 EEST (UTC+3)	Goldar (yellow card) 12' (goal) 90+1'; Guga 40' (yellow card) 45+4'; Šunjić (yellow card) 68'; Biel 93'; Correia 117'	Report	Pajaziti (yellow card) 50'; Pukštas (yellow card) 96'	Stadium: Alphamega Stadium; Attendance: 4,169; Referee: Goga Kikacheishvili (Georgia)
Note: Pafos played their home matches at the Alphamega Stadium in Limassol, instead of their regular stadium, the Stelios Kyriakides Stadium, in Paphos, which did not meet UEFA requirements.

6 August 2026 Third qualifying round 1st leg	Red Bull Salzburg (Austria)	1–0	(Cyprus) Pafos	Salzburg, Austria
20:00 EEST (UTC+3)	Barry (yellow card) 75'; Tabaković 88'	Report	Luiz (yellow card) 36'; Sema (yellow card) 46' (yellow-red card) 90+3'; Šunjić (yellow card) 81'	Stadium: Red Bull Arena; Attendance: 7,704; Referee: Damian Sylwestrzak (Poland)

13 August 2026 Third qualifying round 2nd leg	Pafos (Cyprus)	3–3 (3–4 agg.)	(Austria) Red Bull Salzburg	Limassol, Cyprus
20:00 EEST (UTC+3)	Lelê 15'; Biel 37'; Bruno (yellow card) 48'; Mammadov 84'	Report	Veratschnig (yellow card) 36'; Tabaković 54', 58' (pen.), 70'	Stadium: Alphamega Stadium; Attendance: 6,183; Referee: João Pinheiro (Portugal)
Note: Pafos played their home matches at the Alphamega Stadium in Limassol, instead of their regular stadium, the Stelios Kyriakides Stadium, in Paphos, which did not meet UEFA requirements.

=== UEFA Conference League ===
==== Qualifying phase ====
20 August 2026 Play-off round 1st leg	Dinamo City (Albania)	1–1	(Cyprus) Pafos	Elbasan, Albania
22:00 EEST (UTC+3)	Ayodeji (yellow card) 30'; Fadairo 78'; Dita (yellow card) 81'; Teqja (yellow card) 81'; Vila (yellow card) 86'	Report	Lelê (yellow card) 19' (goal) 83' (pen.); Quina (yellow card) 39'	Stadium: Elbasan Arena; Attendance: 1,550; Referee: Lawrence Visser (Belgium)
Note: Dinamo City played their home matches at Elbasan Arena in Elbasan instead of their own stadium, Selman Stërmasi Stadium in Tirana, which did not fulfil UEFA requirements.

27 August 2026 Play-off round 2nd leg	Pafos (Cyprus)	4–2 (a.e.t.) (5–3 agg.)	(Albania) Dinamo City	Limassol, Cyprus
20:00 EEST (UTC+3)	Sema 13'; Ioannou 78'; Lelê (yellow card) 84'; Quina (yellow card) 90+1'; Pêpê (yellow card) 104'; Luiz (yellow card) 106'; Bruno (yellow card) 113'; Mmaee (yellow card) 113'; Ngamaleu 116'; Anderson 120+1'	Report	Fadairo 8'; Përndreca (yellow card) 26'; Qardaku (yellow card) 56'; Qefalija (yellow card) 56'; Silva-Richards 87'; Ismaili (yellow card) 101'; Vila (yellow card) 113'	Stadium: Alphamega Stadium; Attendance: 4,378; Referee: Martin Matoša (Slovenia)
Note: Pafos played their home matches at the Alphamega Stadium in Limassol, instead of their regular stadium, the Stelios Kyriakides Stadium, in Paphos, which did not meet UEFA requirements.

==== League phase ====
Pos	Team	Pld	W	D	L	GF	GA	GD	Pts
28	(Bulgaria) CSKA Sofia	3	0	1	2	4	6	−2	1
29	(Georgia (country)) Iberia 1999	3	0	1	2	2	5	−3	1
30	(Cyprus) Pafos	3	0	1	2	3	7	−4	1
31	(Spain) Getafe	3	0	1	2	3	7	−4	1
32	(Scotland) Heart of Midlothian	3	0	1	2	2	6	−4	1

Updated to match(es) played on 5 November 2026. Source: UEFA
Rules for classification: League phase tiebreakers

15 October 2026 1	Atalanta (Italy)	3–1	(Cyprus) Pafos	Bergamo, Italy
22:00 EEST (UTC+3)	Elmas 1'; Raspadori 18' (pen.); Scamacca 44'	Report	Biel 88'	Stadium: Stadio di Bergamo; Attendance: 18,709; Referee: Adam Ladebäck (Sweden)

22 October 2026 2	Pafos (Cyprus)	1–1	(Latvia) Riga	Limassol, Cyprus
19:45 EEST (UTC+3)	Šunjić (yellow card) 49'; Biel 76'; Sema (yellow card) 87'	Report	Caio 67'; Toņiševs (yellow card) 90'	Stadium: Alphamega Stadium; Attendance: 3,193; Referee: Marian Barbu (Romania)
Note: Pafos will play their home matches at Alphamega Stadium, Limassol, instead of their regular stadium, Stelios Kyriakides Stadium, Paphos, which does not meet UEFA requirements.

5 November 2026 3	Twente (Netherlands)	3–1	(Cyprus) Pafos	Enschede, Netherlands
22:00 EET (UTC+2)	Nijstad (yellow card) 34' (goal) 62'; Ørjasæter 76'; Weidmann 82'	Report	Lelê 40' (yellow card) 40' (yellow-red card) 64'	Stadium: De Grolsch Veste; Attendance: 28,500; Referee: Michal Očenáš (Slovakia)

26 November 2026 4	Pafos (Cyprus)	v	(Denmark) Midtjylland	Limassol, Cyprus
19:45 EET (UTC+2)				Stadium: Alphamega Stadium
Note: Pafos will play their home matches at Alphamega Stadium, Limassol, instead of their regular stadium, Stelios Kyriakides Stadium, Paphos, which does not meet UEFA requirements.

10 December 2026 5	Mjällby AIF (Sweden)	v	(Cyprus) Pafos	Helsingborg, Sweden
22:00 EET (UTC+2)				Stadium: Olympia
Note: Mjällby AIF will play their home matches at Olympia, Helsingborg, instead of their regular stadium, Strandvallen, Hällevik, which does not meet UEFA requirements.

17 December 2026 6	Pafos (Cyprus)	v	(Scotland) Heart of Midlothian	Limassol, Cyprus
22:00 EEST (UTC+3)				Stadium: Alphamega Stadium
Note: Pafos will play their home matches at Alphamega Stadium, Limassol, instead of their regular stadium, Stelios Kyriakides Stadium, Paphos, which does not meet UEFA requirements.

== Squad statistics ==
As of match played 8 November 2026

=== Appearances and goals ===
No.	Pos	Nat	Player	Total		Cypriot First Division		Cypriot Cup		Super Cup		UEFA Europa League		UEFA Conference League	
No.	Pos	Nat	Player	Apps	Goals	Apps	Goals	Apps	Goals	Apps	Goals	Apps	Goals	Apps	Goals
2	DF	(France) FRA	Yoram Zague	7	2	4+3	1	0	0	0	0+1	0	0	0	0
3	DF	(Morocco) MAR	Samy Mmaee	12	0	6	0	0	0	0	0	1	0	3+2	0
4	DF	(Brazil) BRA	David Luiz	15	0	5	0	0	0	1	0	4	0	5	0
5	DF	(Spain) ESP	David Goldar	9	1	2	0	0	0	1	0	4	1	2	0
6	MF	(Portugal) POR	Guga	19	1	5+4	0	0	0	0+1	0	3+1	1	1+4	0
7	FW	(Brazil) BRA	Bruno Felipe	17	0	4+4	0	0	0	1	0	2+1	0	5	0
8	MF	(Portugal) POR	Domingos Quina	17	2	4+4	1	0	0	1	0	2+1	0	2+3	1
11	FW	(Brazil) BRA	Jajá	2	0	0	0	0	0	0	0	2	0	0	0
12	MF	(Sweden) SWE	Ken Sema	15	1	8+1	0	0	0	0+1	0	0+2	0	1+2	1
13	FW	(Cameroon) CMR	Moumi Ngamaleu	9	1	4	1	0	0	1	0	0+1	0	2+1	0
14	DF	(Cyprus) CYP	Nikolas Ioannou	17	1	7	0	0	0	1	0	4	0	5	1
17	FW	(Portugal) POR	Afonso Patrão	4	0	0+4	0	0	0	0	0	0	0	0	0
18	FW	(Brazil) BRA	Lelê	19	8	7+2	4	0	0	1	1	4	1	4+1	2
20	MF	(Brazil) BRA	Biel Teixeira	12	4	3+2	0	0	0	0	0	4	2	3	2
23	DF	(Portugal) POR	Jónatas Noro	2	1	2	1	0	0	0	0	0	0	0	0
26	MF	(Bosnia and Herzegovina) BIH	Ivan Šunjić	19	0	7+2	0	0	0	1	0	4	0	4+1	0
30	MF	(Romania) ROU	Vlad Dragomir	18	2	8+1	2	0	0	1	0	3+1	0	4	0
33	FW	(Brazil) BRA	Anderson Silva	15	4	3+5	3	0	0	0+1	0	0+1	0	1+4	1
47	MF	(Azerbaijan) AZE	Murad Mammadov	6	1	0+3	0	0	0	0	0	0+3	1	0	0
50	MF	(Portugal) POR	Alexandre Brito	11	0	1+3	0	0	0	0	0	1+2	0	2+2	0
60	MF	(Cyprus) CYP	Christos Efzona	1	0	0+1	0	0	0	0	0	0	0	0	0
61	FW	(Cyprus) CYP	Melinos Kais	1	0	0+1	0	0	0	0	0	0	0	0	0
72	DF	(Cyprus) CYP	Kosmas Ioannou	1	0	0+1	0	0	0	0	0	0	0	0	0
77	DF	(Cape Verde) CPV	João Correia	11	1	4+1	0	0	0	0	0	0+1	1	3+2	0
88	MF	(Portugal) POR	Pêpê	14	0	6	0	0	0	1	0	2+2	0	3	0
99	GK	(Poland) POL	Radosław Majecki	19	0	9	0	0	0	1	0	4	0	5	0
Players away on loan:
Players who appeared for Pafos but left during the season:

=== Goal scorers ===
Place	Position	Nation	Number	Name	Cypriot First Division	Cypriot Cup	Super Cup	UEFA Europa League	UEFA Conference League	Total
1	FW	(Brazil)	18	Lelê	4	0	1	1	2	8
2	FW	(Brazil)	33	Anderson Silva	3	0	0	0	1	4
2	MF	(Brazil)	20	Biel Teixeira	0	0	0	2	2	4
4	MF	(Romania)	30	Vlad Dragomir	2	0	0	0	0	2
4	FW	(Cameroon)	13	Moumi Ngamaleu	1	0	0	0	1	2
6	MF	(Portugal)	8	Domingos Quina	1	0	0	0	0	1
6	DF	(France)	2	Yoram Zague	1	0	0	0	0	1
6	DF	(Portugal)	23	Jónatas Noro	1	0	0	0	0	1
6	MF	(Portugal)	6	Guga	0	0	0	1	0	1
6	DF	(Spain)	5	David Goldar	0	0	0	1	0	1
6	DF	(Cape Verde)	77	João Correia	0	0	0	1	0	1
6	MF	(Azerbaijan)	47	Murad Mammadov	0	0	0	1	0	1
6	MF	(Sweden)	12	Ken Sema	0	0	0	0	1	1
6	DF	(Cyprus)	14	Nikolas Ioannou	0	0	0	0	1	1
Total					13	0	1	7	8	29

=== Clean sheets ===
Place	Position	Nation	Number	Name	Cypriot First Division	Cypriot Cup	Super Cup	UEFA Europa League	UEFA Conference League	Total
1	GK	(Poland)	99	Radosław Majecki	5	0	1	1	0	7
Total					5	0	1	1	0	7

=== Disciplinary record ===
Number	Nation	Position	Name	Cypriot First Division		Cypriot Cup		Super Cup		UEFA Europa League		UEFA Conference League		Total	
Number	Nation	Position	Name	Yellow card	Red card	Yellow card	Red card	Yellow card	Red card	Yellow card	Red card	Yellow card	Red card	Yellow card	Red card
3	(Morocco)	DF	Samy Mmaee	2	0	0	0	0	0	0	0	1	0	3	0
4	(Brazil)	DF	David Luiz	2	0	0	0	0	0	1	0	1	0	4	0
5	(Spain)	DF	David Goldar	0	0	0	0	0	0	1	0	0	0	1	0
6	(Portugal)	MF	Guga	1	0	0	0	0	0	1	0	0	0	2	0
7	(Brazil)	FW	Bruno Felipe	1	0	0	0	0	0	1	0	1	0	3	0
8	(Portugal)	MF	Domingos Quina	3	0	0	0	0	0	0	0	2	0	5	0
12	(Sweden)	MF	Ken Sema	2	0	0	0	0	0	2	1	1	0	5	1
13	(Cameroon)	FW	Moumi Ngamaleu	0	0	0	0	1	0	0	0	0	0	1	0
14	(Cyprus)	DF	Nikolas Ioannou	2	0	0	0	1	0	1	0	0	0	4	0
18	(Brazil)	FW	Lelê	1	0	0	0	1	0	0	0	4	1	6	1
26	(Bosnia and Herzegovina)	MF	Ivan Šunjić	3	0	0	0	1	0	2	0	1	0	7	0
30	(Romania)	MF	Vlad Dragomir	1	0	0	0	1	0	0	0	0	0	2	0
50	(Portugal)	MF	Alexandre Brito	1	0	0	0	0	0	1	0	0	0	2	0
77	(Cape Verde)	DF	João Correia	3	0	0	0	0	0	0	0	0	0	3	0
88	(Portugal)	MF	Pêpê	0	0	0	0	0	0	0	0	1	0	1	0
Players away on loan:
Players who left Pafos during the season:
Total				22	0	0	0	5	0	10	1	12	1	48	2
