= David Luiz =

Brazilian footballer (born 1987)

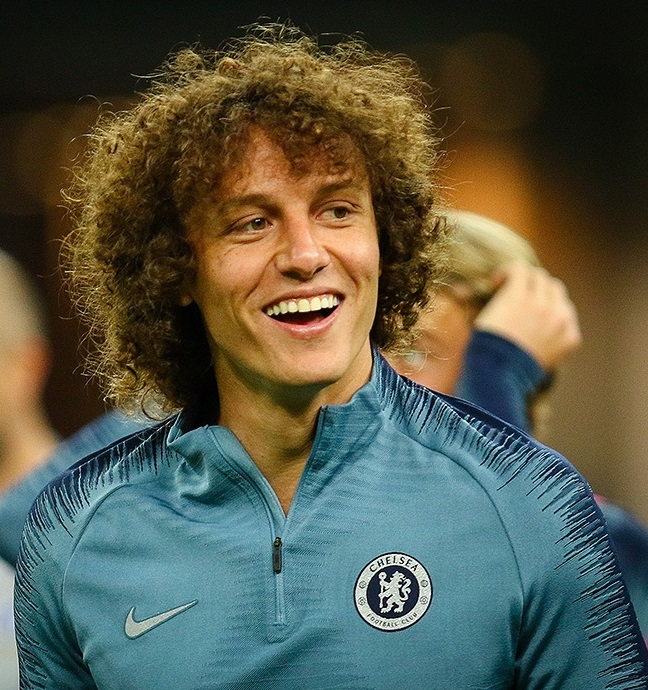
- David Luiz in 2019

Personal information
- Full name: David Luiz Moreira Marinho
- Date of birth: 22 April 1987 (age 39)
- Place of birth: Diadema, Brazil
- Height: 1.89 m (6 ft 2 in)
- Positions: Centre-back; defensive midfielder

Team information
- Current team: Pafos
- Number: 4

Youth career
- 1999–2001: São Paulo
- 2001–2006: Vitória

Senior career*
Years	Team	Apps	(Gls)
2006–2007	Vitória	52	(2)
2007–2011	Benfica	82	(4)
2011–2014	Chelsea	81	(6)
2014–2016	Paris Saint-Germain	56	(3)
2016–2019	Chelsea	79	(5)
2019–2021	Arsenal	53	(3)
2021–2024	Flamengo	86	(4)
2025	Fortaleza	8	(0)
2025–	Pafos	31	(4)

International career^{‡}
2007	Brazil U20	6	(0)
2010–2017	Brazil	57	(3)
Medal record
Men's football
Representing Brazil
FIFA Confederations Cup
Winner	2013 Brazil
- * Club domestic league appearances and goals as of 19:04, 11 October 2026 (UTC) ‡ National team caps and goals as of 07:28, 19 June 2020 (UTC)

David Luiz Moreira Marinho (born 22 April 1987) is a Brazilian professional footballer who plays as a defender for Cypriot First Division club Pafos. He is primarily a centre-back, but has also been deployed as a defensive midfielder. Noted for his presence on the pitch as well as his specialty in taking free-kicks, David Luiz is considered amongst the best defenders of his generation.

After starting out at Vitoria, David Luiz moved to Benfica, remaining with the club for five seasons (three complete). He joined Chelsea in January 2011, winning the UEFA Champions League during the 2011–12 season. In the following season he won the UEFA Europa League. In June 2014, he transferred to Paris Saint-Germain for a fee of £50 million, at that time a world record transfer for a defender, and won all four domestic competitions over his two seasons in French football. During his time in France, Luiz was selected in the FIFPRO Men's World 11 in 2014. He returned to Chelsea in August 2016 in a £30 million transfer deal, winning a Premier League and second Europa League title. He transferred to local rivals Arsenal in 2019 before returning to his home country to play for Flamengo in 2021.

David Luiz made his full international debut for Brazil in 2010 and has since earned more than 50 caps for his country. He was a member of the Brazilian teams which won the 2013 FIFA Confederations Cup and reached the semi-finals of the 2014 FIFA World Cup, and has also represented his nation in two editions of the Copa América.

== Club career ==
=== Vitória ===
Born in Diadema, São Paulo, to Ladislao and Regina Marinho, David Luiz arrived at Salvador-based club Vitória after being released by São Paulo, and started playing as a defensive midfielder, almost leaving the club for his poor performances in that position. However, he was soon moved to central defender and adapted well.

David Luiz made his debut for Vitória in 2006, excelling in a 2–2 draw against Santa Cruz in that season's Copa do Brasil. At the worst situation of its history, in the third division, the club eventually promoted to the second level after finishing in second position, with the player appearing in eight of the club's last decisive nine games, scoring his only league goal on 3 September 2006 in a 2–0 home win against Clube Atlético do Porto.

David luiz won with vitoria SC the Campeonato Baiano in 2006, the Taca Estado Da Bahia, the copa do nordeste in 2006

=== Benfica ===
==== 2007–10: Primeira Liga and Taça da Liga ====
On 31 January 2007, David Luiz joined Portuguese club Benfica as a replacement for Tottenham Hotspur-bound Ricardo Rocha, on loan. He made a somewhat tumultuous debut for the club in a UEFA Cup match against Paris Saint-Germain at the Parc des Princes, partnering compatriot Anderson in the centre of defence, replacing the injured Luisão. Benfica lost the match 2–1 but progressed to the next round after winning 4–3 on aggregate.

On 12 March 2007, David Luiz played his first league match for Benfica, against União de Leiria. At the end of the season, following ten league appearances, he joined permanently for a €1.5 million transfer fee and signed a five-year contract with the club. Before the ensuing campaign, he scored his first goal for the club in the Guadiana Trophy friendly tournament, against Sporting CP. However, David Luiz only managed eight appearances in the league due to injury as Benfica finished fourth.

On 11 January 2009, David Luiz scored his first goal for Benfica, the match's only goal in a home success against Braga. He played most of the campaign as a left back, at the expense of Portuguese international Jorge Ribeiro.

However, it was in the 2009–10 season, when new manager Jorge Jesus arrived to Benfica, that David Luiz became a club symbol and vice-captain. He was ever-present, appearing in 49 matches (three goals, 4,206 minutes), as Benfica won the league after a five-year wait. In the season's Taça da Liga, in a 1–4 away win against Sporting CP, he opened the score in the eighth minute, with Benfica also eventually winning the competition. David Luiz won the Portuguese Liga Player of the Year that same season with 38% of the vote while the runner-up, his teammate Ángel Di María, received 8%.

On 30 September 2009, Benfica sold 25% of David Luiz's economic rights on any future transfer to a third-party owner, Benfica Stars Fund, along with other teammates. He was valued at €18 million, with the fund paying €4.5 million; his contract was also renewed in October with a release clause of €50 million.

=== Chelsea ===
==== 2011–12: FA Cup and Champions league victory ====
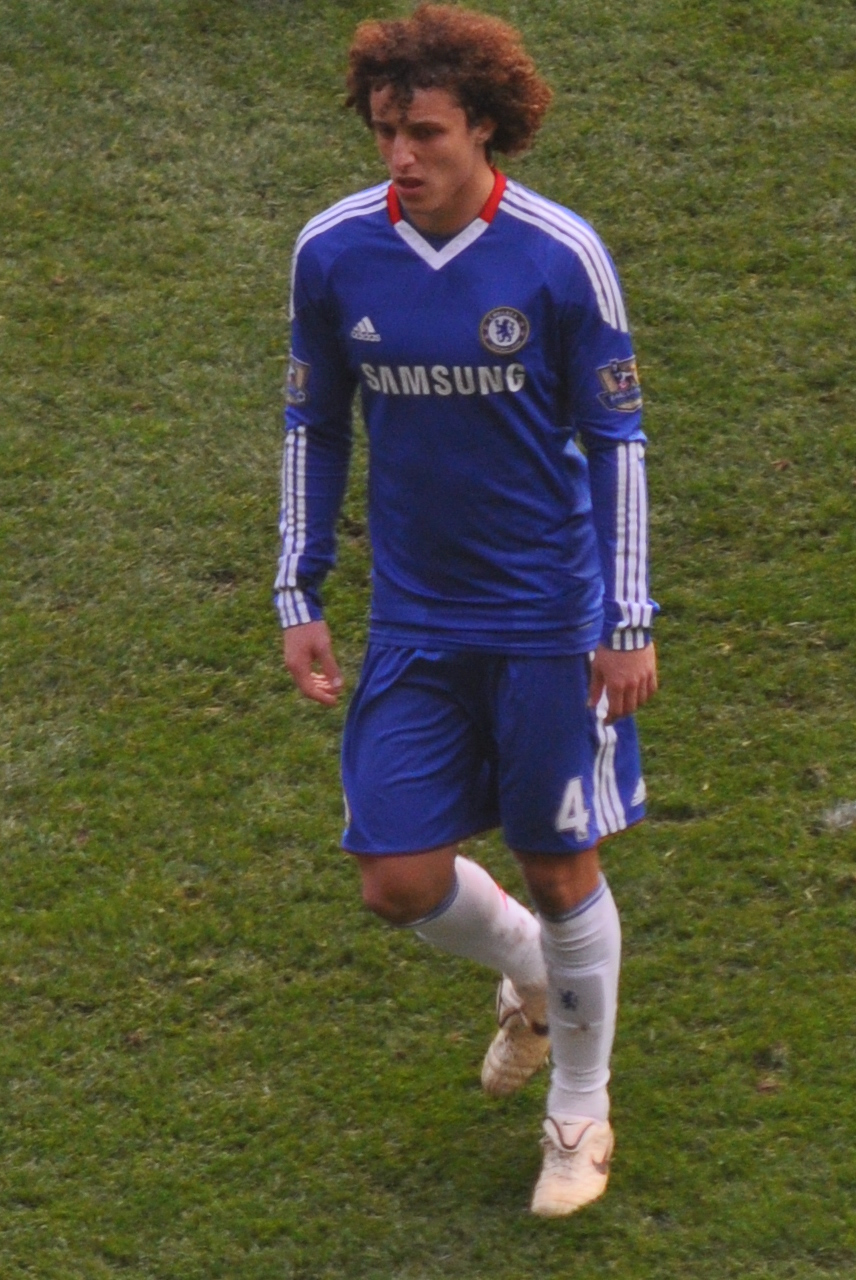
David Luiz playing for Chelsea in 2011

On 31 January 2011, David Luiz completed a move to Chelsea for a €25 million transfer fee and subsequently signed a five-and-a-half-year contract. As part of the deal, Chelsea midfielder Nemanja Matić joined Benfica at the end of the season after his transfer spell at Dutch club Vitesse.

David Luiz made his Premier League debut on 6 February, replacing José Bosingwa in a 0–1 home loss against Liverpool. Eight days later in a 0–0 draw against Fulham at Craven Cottage, he made his first start for Chelsea. Instantly becoming a cult hero amongst the Chelsea fans, David Luiz was awarded the Barclays Man of the Match award for his performance, despite giving away a penalty in the 93rd minute of the match, which was saved by Petr Čech.

On 1 March, David Luiz scored his first goal for Chelsea to help the Blues come from behind to win 2–1 against Manchester United at Stamford Bridge. On 20 March, he headed in his second goal for the Blues in a 2–0 home win over Manchester City, and again receiving the man of the match award, as well as the Premier League Player of the Month for March.

David Luiz missed the first three matches of 2011–12 season due to a knee injury. He made his return to the first team on 13 September in a UEFA Champions League group stage match against Bayer Leverkusen in which he scored from 15 yards to break the deadlock in an eventual 2–0 home win. In his second match, a League Cup third round tie against Fulham, he scored his penalty shoot-out attempt in a 4–3 win (0–0 after 120 minutes).

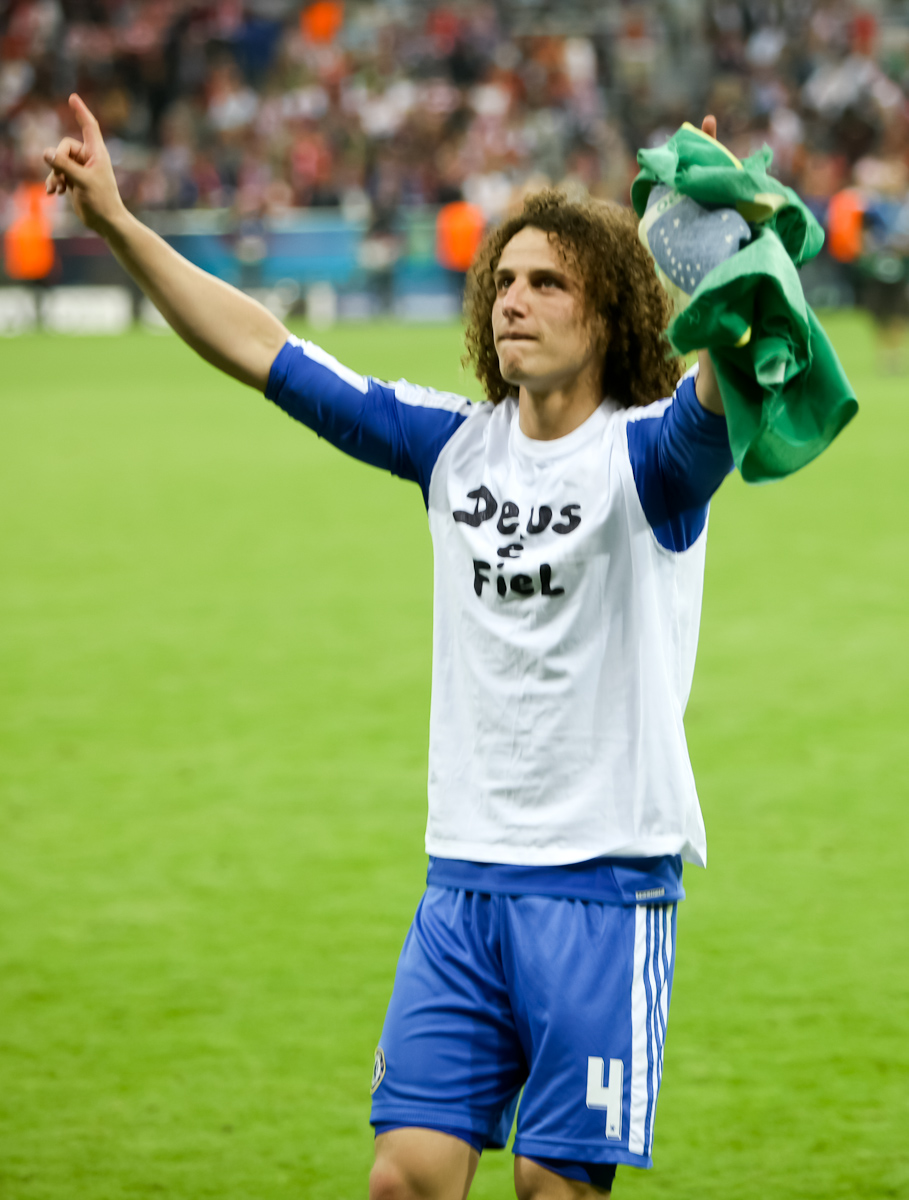
David Luiz with a T-shirt saying "Deus é fiel" ("God is faithful") after winning the Champions League

On 5 February 2012, in a league home fixture against Manchester United, David Luiz put Chelsea ahead 3–0 in the 50th minute after his header was deflected by Rio Ferdinand, following a Juan Mata free kick. The match ended with a 3–3 draw. On 25 February, through a curled shot, he opened the score against Bolton Wanderers in an eventual 3–0 at home.

On 14 March, Chelsea faced Napoli in the Champions League's round of 16, following a 3–1 loss at the Stadio San Paolo in Naples. David Luiz made a stunning performance to help his team win the tie with a 4–1 extra-time win, being subsequently chosen by UEFA as the man of the match, an accolade he also received in the first leg of the quarter-finals against former team Benfica in a 0–1 away win. However, after leaving the pitch in the FA Cup semi-final against rivals Tottenham with a muscular injury, it was announced that he would miss both of the Champions League semi-finals encounters against Barcelona and the domestic cup final. He played, however, in the Champions League final – John Terry was also suspended for the match – David Luiz appeared, and started for Chelsea, playing the full 120 minutes, along with converting his penalty shootout attempt as the Blues won the shootout 4–3.

==== 2012–14: Europa league victory ====
On 22 September 2012, David Luiz signed a new five-year contract with Chelsea. He started the new season again as a regular alongside either Gary Cahill or Terry, and scored his first goal from a free-kick against Nordsjælland in a 0–4 away win in the campaign's Champions League. In the Club World Cup in 2012, in which Chelsea lost in the final to Corinthians, he was chosen the second best player of the tournament, receiving the Silver Ball for his performances, one of which was as a defensive midfielder. He played in that position in an 8–0 home thrashing of Aston Villa the following week, being chosen man of the Match and netting the second from a free-kick.

On 17 April 2013, David Luiz scored during a 3–0 West London derby victory against Fulham. He also scored in both legs of the Europa League semi-finals against Basel; the first was a last minute, low free-kick curled around the wall and into the goalkeeper's bottom left-hand corner to secure a dramatic 2–1 away win, giving Chelsea an advantage going into the second leg at Stamford Bridge.

David Luiz was widely criticised for a controversial incident during Chelsea's 0–1 away win over Manchester United at Old Trafford on 5 May. After he elbowed opponent Rafael, the United defender kicked out at him and was sent off. David Luiz, however, was seen smiling while lying on the ground before writhing around in mock agony. David Luiz defended himself, saying he was smiling at the Manchester United fans who could be seen screaming insults and laughing at him.

=== Paris Saint-Germain ===
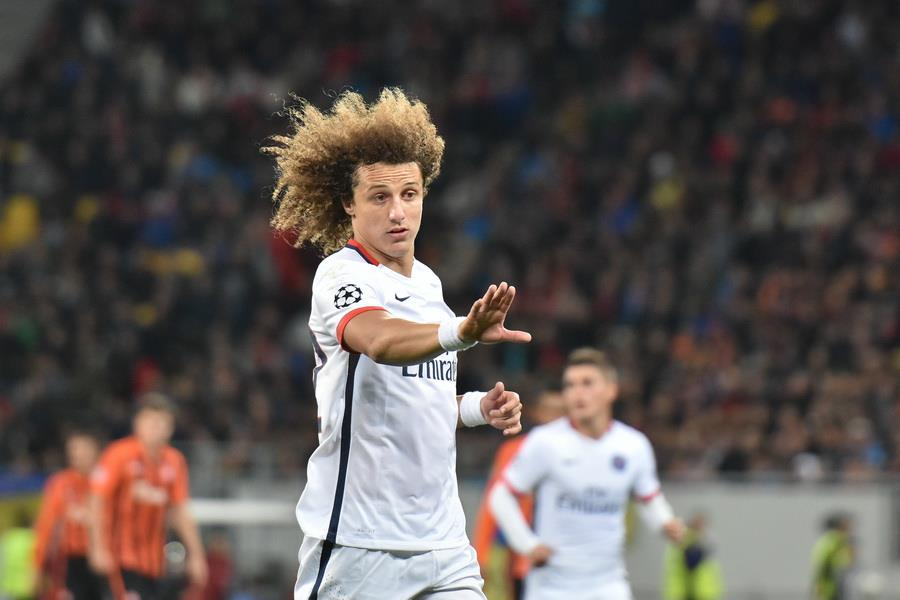
David Luiz playing for Paris Saint-Germain in 2015

On 13 June 2014, David Luiz transferred to French club Paris Saint-Germain for a £50 million transfer fee, signing a five-year contract.

He made his Ligue 1 debut on 16 August, partnering compatriot Marquinhos in central defence as PSG defeated Bastia 2–0 at the Parc des Princes. On 30 September, David Luiz scored his first PSG goal, opening a 3–2 home win over Barcelona in the Champions League group stage. He was seen as a surprise inclusion in the FIFA World Team of the Year at the 2014 Ballon d'Or awards.

On 19 January 2015, David Luiz scored his first Ligue 1 goal in a 4–2 defeat of Evian. On 11 March, he scored on his return to Stamford Bridge in the round of 16 of the Champions League as PSG drew 2–2 with his former club Chelsea to knock out the English club on away goals. He apologised for celebrating the goal, saying that it was the result of sudden emotion rather than malice towards his former employers.

In David Luiz's first season at the club, PSG won a domestic treble of the Ligue 1 championship, the Coupe de France and the Coupe de la Ligue, in addition to the Trophée des Champions. In his second season at the club, PSG repeated this accomplishment once again, after beating Marseille in the Coupe de France final.

=== Return to Chelsea ===
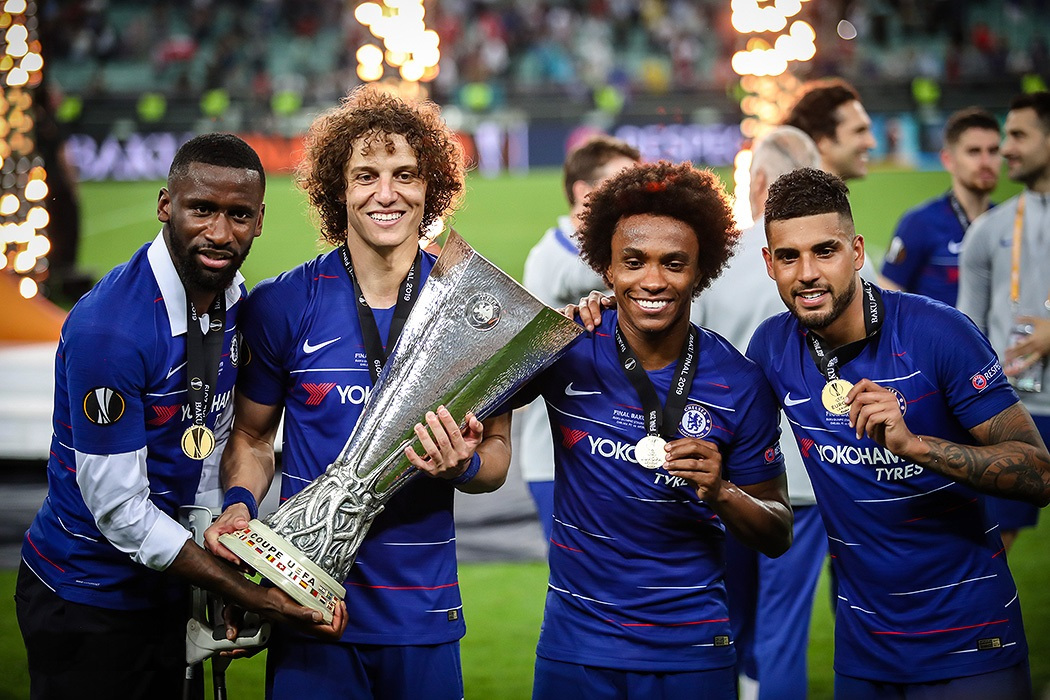
David Luiz holding the UEFA Europa League trophy after winning the final with Chelsea

David Luiz returned to Chelsea from PSG, for a reported fee of £34 million, in August 2016 and signed a three-year deal. His first game back with the club was a 2–1 defeat at home to Liverpool on 16 September. On 31 January 2017 he scored his first goal for the season from a free kick against Liverpool at Anfield, his first Premier League goal since April 2013. At the end of the season, David Luiz was named in the PFA Team of the Year for 2016–17.

David Luiz was selected for Chelsea's first match of the 2017–18 Premier League season, against Burnley on 12 August 2017, and scored late on in their 3–2 defeat. On 17 September 2017, Luiz received a straight red after a poor challenge on Sead Kolašinac during a 0–0 draw against Arsenal. Luiz became the third player to be sent-off in the last three meetings between the two rivals from London; with the others being Pedro during the FA Community Shield and Victor Moses during the FA Cup Final. Chelsea went on to win the 2017-18 FA Cup but David Luiz was injured and missed the final.

David Luiz scored his first goal of the 2018–19 Premier League, heading in the second goal in Chelsea's 2–0 home win over the previously undefeated Manchester City on 8 December. He hit the winning penalty in a 4–2 shootout win in the EFL Cup semi-final second leg at home to Tottenham Hotspur on 24 January 2019.

=== Arsenal ===
==== 2019–20 season ====
On 8 August 2019, Arsenal signed David Luiz from Chelsea for a reported £8 million transfer fee. He received the number 23 shirt for the club. On 6 October 2019, he scored the match's winning goal, his first for Arsenal, in a 1–0 victory against AFC Bournemouth. In a 2–2 home draw against Crystal Palace, he scored his second Arsenal goal. In a match against former club Chelsea in January 2020, he was sent-off after conceding a penalty. While Arsenal eventually drew the match, David Luiz received a three-match suspension from domestic play. He made his return in a Premier League match against Everton, during which he recorded his first assist for Arsenal.

Following the suspension of football due to the COVID-19 pandemic, David Luiz was named on the bench in a match at the Etihad Stadium against Manchester City. However, an injury to Pablo Marí saw him enter play just 24 minutes in. He then committed an error leading to City's first goal before he conceded a penalty and was sent-off early in the second half. In so doing, he became the first player to receive a red card (making him the player with the most red cards this season), concede a penalty and commit an error leading to goal in a Premier League match for five years.

In Arsenal's final match of the season, David Luiz gave away a penalty against Watford; this was the fifth penalty he had conceded that season, setting a Premier League record for most penalties conceded by a single player in a single season. On 1 August 2020, David Luiz was selected to start in the FA Cup Final against his former club Chelsea, as Arsenal won their 14th FA Cup.

==== 2020–21 season ====
On 29 August 2020, David Luiz started the game and scored the fourth penalty in a shootout win against Liverpool in the 2020 FA Community Shield after the game ended 1–1.

On 29 November 2020, he was a part of a severe head collision with Raúl Jiménez at the Emirates Stadium in which Jiménez was knocked out. Jiménez was sent to a London hospital and received surgery for his fractured skull, whilst David Luiz was only bandaged on the head due to a cut on his forehead. He was surprisingly allowed to play on after the incident but was subbed off at half time. He was last seen bleeding through his bandage before the half time whistle, which led to a spark of protests from both footballers and fans, demanding a 'free substitution' for those who are concussed on the pitch.

On 28 February 2021, he scored his first Premier League goal of the season in a 3–1 away win against Leicester City. On 6 March, he made his 50th league appearance for Arsenal in a 1–1 draw against Burnley.

It was confirmed on 18 May by manager Mikel Arteta that David Luiz would leave the club at the end of his contract in June 2021.

=== Flamengo ===
On 11 September 2021, David Luiz signed a 15-month contract with Flamengo, making his return to Brazil after spending nearly 15 years playing club football in Europe. He was part of the Flamengo squad that competed in the 2021 Copa Libertadores Final on 27 November, playing the full 120 minutes as his team lost 2–1 to Palmeiras after extra time. On 29 October 2022, he played in the 2022 Copa Libertadores Final against Athletico Paranaense, which ended in a 1–0 victory; hence, he became the twelfth player to win both the UEFA Champions League and the Copa Libertadores.

On 13 May 2023, David Luiz scored his first goal for Flamengo. In the sixth round of the Campeonato Brasileiro, against Esporte Clube Bahia, David Luiz hit a header to goalkeeper Marcos Felipe. Despite scoring the first goal, David Luiz did not celebrate. After the game, he explained why he didn't celebrate:

It's a very special city for me. I left home very early to come to Salvador. I didn't celebrate because I didn't know if it would be an impediment or not.

— David Luiz

On 22 December 2024, Flamengo confirmed that Luiz would not have his contract renewed and would subsequently leave the club. David Luiz left Rubro-Negro after 132 games for the club: 75 wins, 28 draws and 29 losses. The defender scored four goals and provided two assists. In addition, he won a Libertadores, two Copa do Brasil and a Carioca.

=== Fortaleza ===
On 20 January 2025, Fortaleza announced the signing of David Luiz on a free transfer until 31 December 2026, with the option of an additional year's extension. On 11 February, he made his debut in a 2–1 defeat to Altos in the Copa do Nordeste. He left the club by mutual consent on 1 August, having made 17 appearances in a six-month spell.

=== Pafos ===
On 3 August 2025, Cypriot First Division club Pafos announced the signing of Luiz on a contract until the summer of 2027, returning to European football after nearly four years. On 13 September, Luiz made his league debut for Pafos in a 1–0 loss against Apollon. He would score his first goal for the club in a 4–0 win against Ethnikos Achna on 17 October 2025. On November 26, he would also score in the UEFA Champions League against AS Monaco, his first goal in that competition since 2017 with Chelsea.

== International career ==
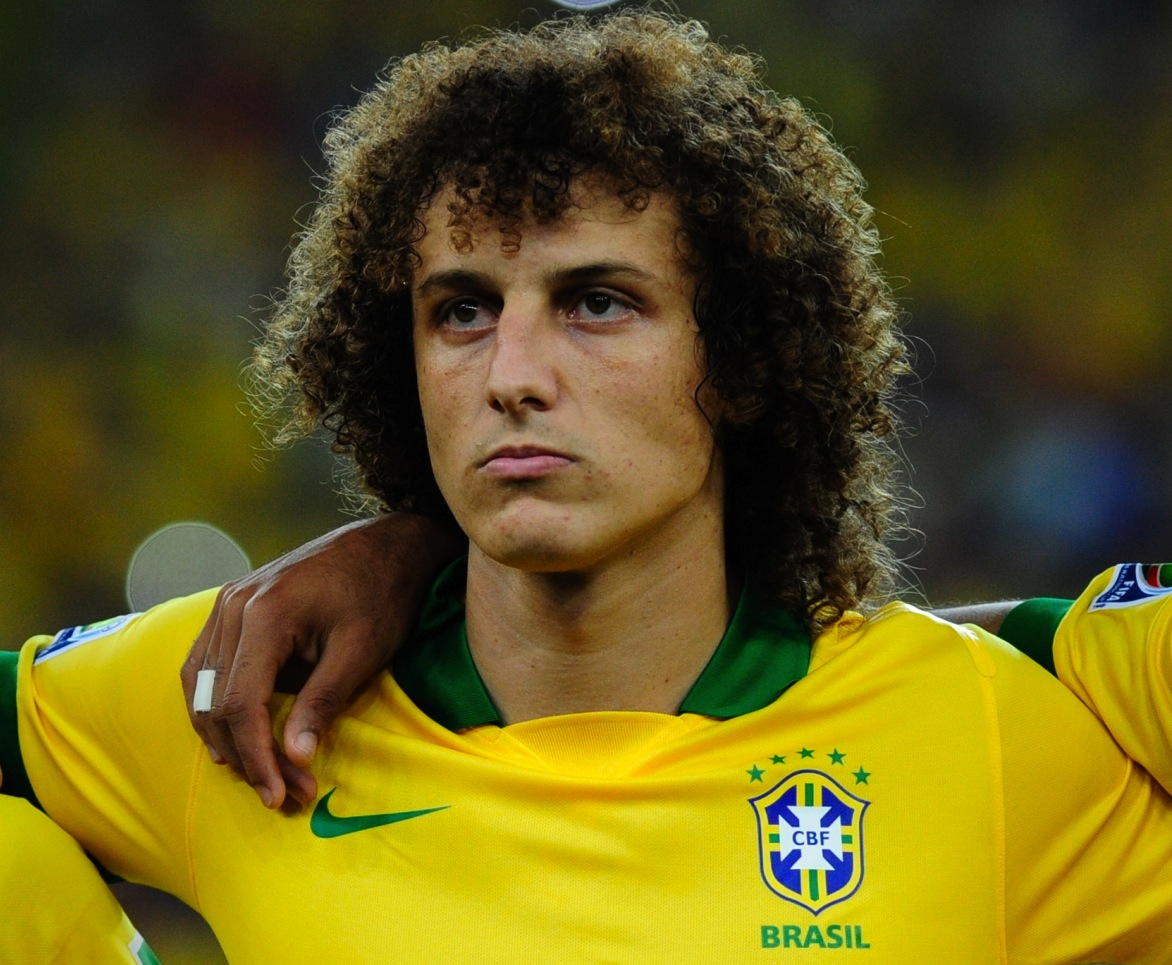
David Luiz playing for Brazil at the 2013 FIFA Confederations Cup

David Luiz played with the Brazil under-20 team at the FIFA U-20 World Cup in 2007, with the team being ousted in the round of 16.

Courtesy of his solid season at Benfica, Luiz received his first call-up to Brazilian senior squad for a friendly match against the United States on 10 August 2010 after Mano Menezes replaced Dunga as national team coach. His debut ended in a 2–0 victory for Brazil. Prior to doing so, the Portuguese Football Federation had considered calling him up to their own national team.

David Luiz was present in every squad during the management of Menezes and was called up to the squad for the Copa América in 2011, but did not make a single appearance at the tournament due to injury. In a friendly with Mexico in October of that year, he scored an own goal, but the Seleção eventually won it 2–1.

On 7 September 2012, David Luiz captained Brazil for the first time, appearing in a 1–0 victory against South Africa in São Paulo. He was included in the squad for the FIFA Confederations Cup in 2013, which was hosted in his native Brazil. Alongside teammate Thiago Silva, David Luiz started all matches and helped Brazil win their fourth Confederations Cup title. In the final against Spain, he made an outstanding goal-line clearance from Pedro's shot.

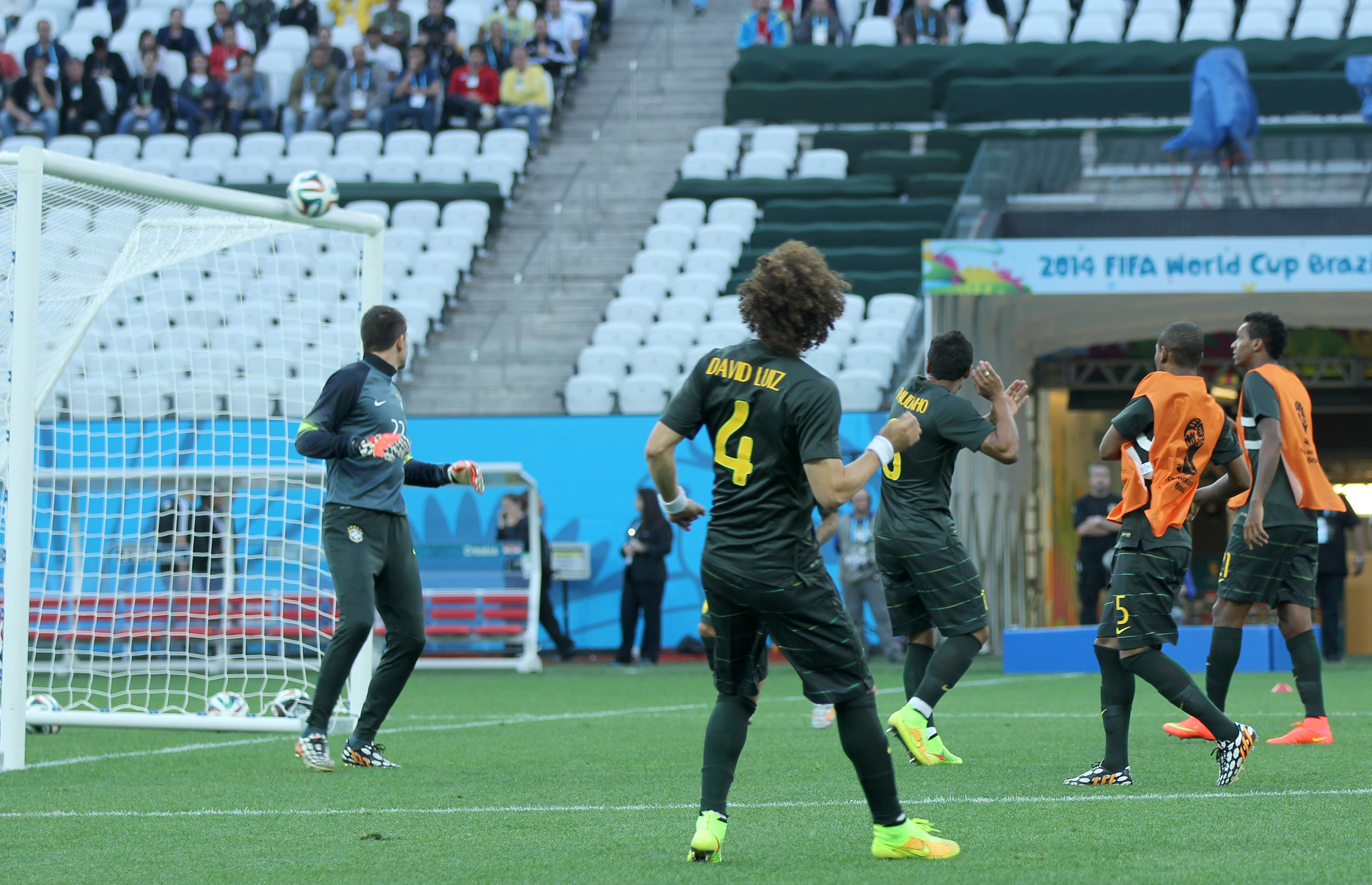
David Luiz training with Brazil before the 2014 FIFA World Cup opening match, against Croatia

On 2 June, David Luiz was named in Brazil's squad for the 2014 FIFA World Cup. He scored his first international goal in a 1–1 draw against Chile in the round of 16. He subsequently converted the team's first kick in the penalty shootout as they prevailed 3–2. He scored the winning goal from a 35-yard free kick in a 2–1 win against Colombia in the quarter-final, and celebrated the goal by running towards the corner flag and kicking it. In the absence of Thiago Silva due to suspension, David Luiz captained the Seleção in their infamous 7–1 defeat to Germany at the semi-final stage of the tournament. Brazil went on to lose the third-place play-off 3–0 against the Netherlands.

David Luiz was a member of Brazil's squad for the 2015 Copa América in Chile. He partnered Miranda in central defence for the team's first two group matches, before being dropped for Thiago Silva, as Brazil were knocked out by Paraguay in the quarter-finals.

On 13 November 2015, David Luiz received his first career red card in a 1–1 2018 World Cup qualifying draw with rivals Argentina in Buenos Aires. In 2016, David Luiz and Thiago Silva were among several experienced players who were not chosen for the squad that travelled to the Copa América Centenario in the United States.

== Style of play ==
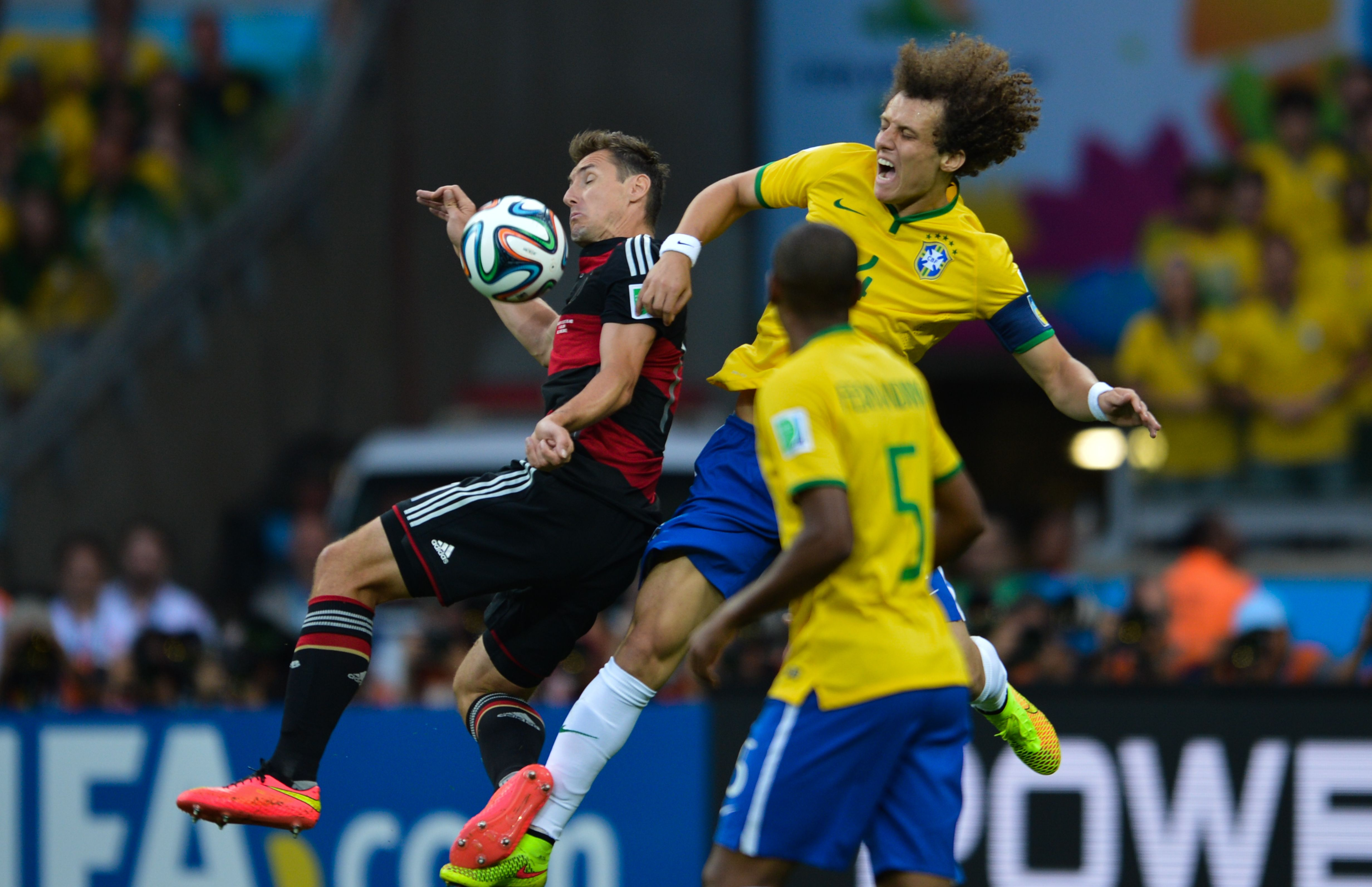
David Luiz captaining his country battling Miroslav Klose in the 7–1 defeat to Germany

Although primarily a centre back, David Luiz can also be deployed as a defensive midfielder or as a full back, and has drawn praise for his physical strength, work-rate, technique, and range of distribution as a defender, as well as his personality, composure in possession, and confidence on the ball, which enables him to play the ball out from the back or launch an attack with long balls after winning back possession. A powerful striker of the ball from distance, Luiz has also been known to take and score from long-range free kicks, which led Tim Vickery to liken him to compatriot Lúcio in 2011. Although in the past he has been criticised in the media for his inconsistent defensive performances, and for being reckless in his challenges and conceding an excessive number of fouls (some of which have caused injuries to his opponents), as well as for being prone to errors or lapses in concentration, during the 2016–17 season, he showed notable improvements upon his return to Chelsea, when the club's new manager Antonio Conte decided to deploy him as a ball-playing centre back in a three-man back-line in the team's 3–4–3 formation. Luiz excelled in the new role, while Conte praised the defender for working to improve his composure and concentration, and singled out Luiz as being "crucial" to the team's success, also labelling him as one of the best defenders in the world.

== Personal life ==
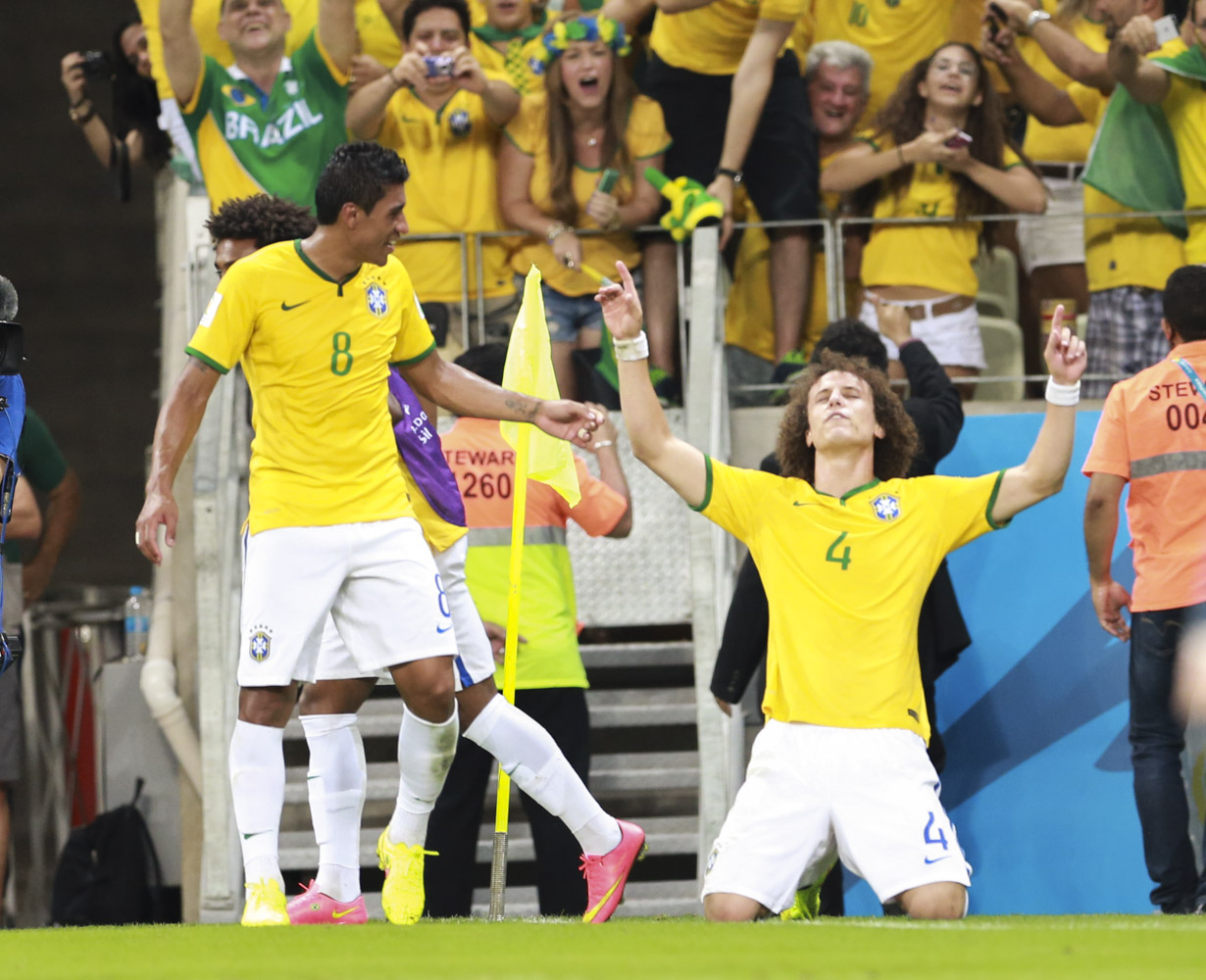
Luiz celebrates his goal by pointing to the sky after scoring against Colombia at the World Cup.

David Luiz is a devout Evangelical Christian and has named Kaká as his role model. He said, "My faith gives me the belief that I can go out and perform and improve as a player. It gives me strength and inspiration." He later added, "Everything in life belongs to God. Our purpose has already been mapped out." He received baptism in May 2015 in the indoor swimming pool of his Brazil and PSG teammate Maxwell.

Earlier in his career, David Luiz was likened physically to the Brazilian basketball player Anderson Varejão by fans in his own country, due to their similar hairstyle. In England, he was referred to as The Simpsons villain Sideshow Bob by opposition fans, and also in self-reference.

David Luiz is also a Portuguese citizen, which was acquired during his time at Benfica. Portugal wanted him to represent their national team, but he opted to play for his native Brazil instead.

In 2018, Luiz and his teammate Willian acquired Babbo, an Italian restaurant located in Mayfair, London.

=== Controversies ===
In August 2025, David Luiz was named in a police report filed by a woman who claimed she had been threatened after becoming in a relationship with him and another partner. The player denied the allegations, stating that there had been no meeting or threats against the woman.

== Career statistics ==
=== Club ===
As of match played 15 October 2026

Appearances and goals club, season and competition
Club	Season	League			State league (Note: Includes Campeonato Baiano, Campeonato Carioca, Campeonato Cearense)		National cup (Note: Includes Copa do Brasil, Taça de Portugal, FA Cup, Coupe de France, Cypriot Cup)		League cup (Note: Includes Taça da Liga, Football League/EFL Cup, Coupe de la Ligue)		Continental		Other		Total	
Club	Season	Division	Apps	Goals	Apps	Goals	Apps	Goals	Apps	Goals	Apps	Goals	Apps	Goals	Apps	Goals
Vitória	2006	Série C	26	1	24	1	3	0	—		—		—		53	2
Vitória	2007	Série B	0	0	2	0	0	0	—		—		—		2	0
Vitória	Total		26	1	26	1	3	0	—		—		—		55	2
Benfica (loan)	2006–07	Primeira Liga	10	0	—		0	0	—		4 (Note: Appearances in UEFA Cup)	0	—		14	0
Benfica	2007–08	Primeira Liga	8	0	—		2	0	0	0	4 (Note: Three appearances in UEFA Champions League, one appearance in UEFA Cup)	0	—		14	0
Benfica	2008–09	Primeira Liga	19	2	—		2	0	4	0	2	1	—		27	3
Benfica	2009–10	Primeira Liga	29	2	—		2	0	5	1	13 (Note: Appearances in UEFA Europa League)	0	—		49	3
Benfica	2010–11	Primeira Liga	16	0	—		3	0	2	0	6 (Note: Appearances in UEFA Champions League)	0	1 (Note: Appearance in Supertaça Cândido de Oliveira)	0	28	0
Benfica	Total		82	4	—		9	0	11	1	29	1	1	0	132	6
Chelsea	2010–11	Premier League	12	2	—		0	0	—		—		—		12	2
Chelsea	2011–12	Premier League	20	2	—		6	0	3	0	11	1	—		40	3
Chelsea	2012–13	Premier League	30	2	—		6	0	4	1	13 (Note: Seven appearances and two goals in UEFA Champions League, six appearances and two goals in UEFA Europa League)	4	4 (Note: One appearance in FA Community Shield, one appearance in UEFA Super Cup, two appearances in FIFA Club World Cup)	0	57	7
Chelsea	2013–14	Premier League	19	0	—		3	0	3	0	8	0	1 (Note: Appearance in UEFA Super Cup)	0	34	0
Chelsea	Total		81	6	—		15	0	10	1	32	5	5	0	143	12
Paris Saint-Germain	2014–15	Ligue 1	28	2	—		4	1	3	0	10	2	0	0	45	5
Paris Saint-Germain	2015–16	Ligue 1	25	1	—		3	0	4	1	7	1	1 (Note: Appearance in Trophée des Champions)	0	40	3
Paris Saint-Germain	2016–17	Ligue 1	3	0	—		—		—		—		1	0	4	0
Paris Saint-Germain	Total		56	3	—		7	1	7	1	17	3	2	0	89	8
Chelsea	2016–17	Premier League	33	1	—		3	0	2	0	—		—		38	1
Chelsea	2017–18	Premier League	10	1	—		2	0	0	0	4	1	1 (Note: Appearance in FA Community Shield)	0	17	2
Chelsea	2018–19	Premier League	36	3	—		2	0	5	0	6	0	1	0	50	3
Chelsea	Total		79	5	—		7	0	7	0	10	1	2	0	105	6
Arsenal	2019–20	Premier League	33	2	—		5	0	0	0	5	0	—		43	2
Arsenal	2020–21	Premier League	20	1	—		1	0	1	0	7	1	1	0	30	2
Arsenal	Total		53	3	—		6	0	1	0	12	1	1	0	73	4
Flamengo	2021	Série A	7	0	—		0	0	—		3 (Note: Appearances in Copa Libertadores)	0	—		10	0
Flamengo	2022	Série A	19	0	10	0	7	0	—		10	0	1 (Note: Appearance in Supercopa do Brasil)	0	47	0
Flamengo	2023	Série A	15	1	8	0	5	0	—		6	0	5 (Note: One appearance in Supercopa do Brasil, two appearances in FIFA Club World Cup, two appearances in Recopa Sudamericana)	0	39	1
Flamengo	2024	Série A	23	3	4	0	3	0	—		6	0	—		36	3
Flamengo	Total		64	4	22	0	15	0	—		25	0	6	0	132	4
Fortaleza	2025	Série A	7	0	1	0	2	0	—		4	0	3 (Note: Appearances in Copa do Nordeste)	0	17	0
Pafos	2025–26	Cypriot First Division	27	4	—		4	0	—		7	1	1 (Note: Appearance in Cypriot Super Cup)	0	39	5
Pafos	2026–27	Cypriot First Division	4	0	—		0	0	—		7 (Note: Four appearances in UEFA Europa League, three appearances in UEFA Conference League)	0	1	0	12	0
Pafos	Total		31	4	—		4	0	—		14	0	2	0	51	5
Career total			479	30	49	1	69	1	36	3	143	12	22	0	795	47

=== International ===
As of match played 13 June 2017

Appearances and goals by national team and year
National team	Year	Apps	Goals
Brazil	2010	4	0
Brazil	2011	6	0
Brazil	2012	7	0
Brazil	2013	16	0
Brazil	2014	14	3
Brazil	2015	7	0
Brazil	2016	1	0
Brazil	2017	1	0
Total		57	3

As of match played 13 June 2017. Brazil score listed first, score column indicates score after each David Luiz goal.

List of international goals scored by David Luiz
No.	Date	Venue	Opponent	Score	Result	Competition
1	28 June 2014	Estádio Mineirão, Belo Horizonte, Brazil	Chile	1–0	1–1	2014 FIFA World Cup
2	4 July 2014	Estádio Castelão, Fortaleza, Brazil	Colombia	2–0	2–1	2014 FIFA World Cup
3	18 November 2014	Ernst-Happel-Stadion, Vienna, Austria	Austria	1–0	2–1	Friendly

== Honours ==
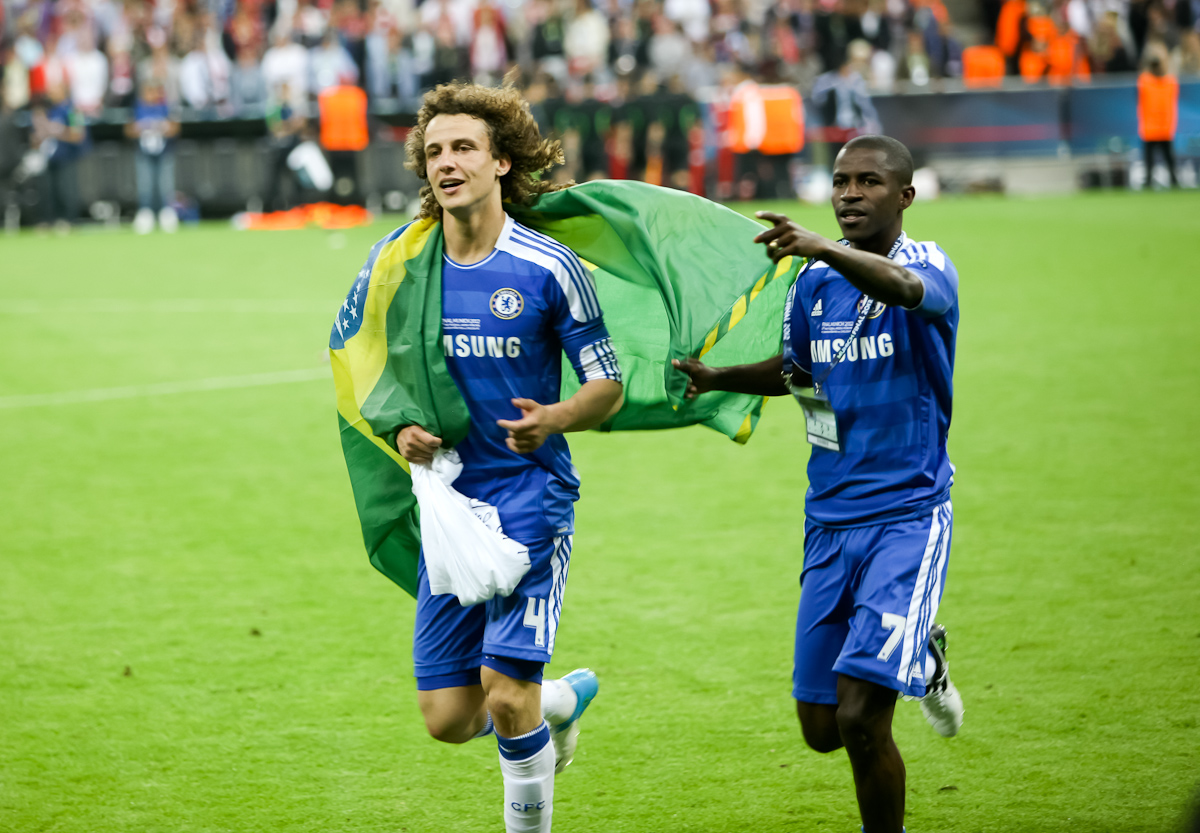
David Luiz (left) with Ramires after the Champions League final in 2012

Benfica

- Primeira Liga: 2009–10
- Taça da Liga: 2008–09, 2009–10

Chelsea

- Premier League: 2016–17
- FA Cup: 2011–12, 2017–18
- UEFA Champions League: 2011–12
- UEFA Europa League: 2012–13, 2018–19

Paris Saint-Germain

- Ligue 1: 2014–15, 2015–16
- Coupe de France: 2014–15, 2015–16
- Coupe de la Ligue: 2014–15, 2015–16
- Trophée des Champions: 2015, 2016

Arsenal

- FA Cup: 2019–20
- FA Community Shield: 2020

Flamengo

- Copa Libertadores: 2022
- Copa do Brasil: 2022, 2024
- Campeonato Carioca: 2024

Pafos

- Cypriot Cup: 2025–26
- Cypriot Super Cup: 2026

Brazil

- FIFA Confederations Cup: 2013

Luiz, Cássio and Paolo Guerrero (from left to right) accepting their individual awards after the 2012 FIFA Club World Cup final

Individual

- LPFP Primeira Liga Player of the Year: 2009–10
- Premier League Player of the Month: March 2011
- FIFA Club World Cup Silver Ball: 2012
- FIFA World Cup Dream Team: 2014
- FIFA FIFPro World XI: 2014
- FIFA FIFPro World XI 2nd team: 2013
- FIFA FIFPro World XI 3rd team: 2015, 2017
- Ligue 1 Team of the Year: 2014–15, 2015–16
- PFA Team of the Year: 2016–17 Premier League
- ESM Team of the Year: 2016–17
- UEFA Europa League Squad of the Season: 2018–19
- Troféu Mesa Redonda: 2022
- Copa Libertadores Team of the Tournament: 2022
- South American Team of the Year: 2022
