= Camil Mmaee =

Moroccan footballer (born 2004)

Personal information
- Full name: Camil Mmaee A Nwameben
- Date of birth: 21 February 2004 (age 22)
- Place of birth: Tongeren, Belgium
- Height: 1.84 m (6 ft 0 in)
- Position: Forward

Team information
- Current team: Sarpsborg 08
- Number: 7

Youth career
- 2010–2013: Gent
- 2013–2022: Standard Liège
- 2022–2024: Bologna

Senior career*
| Years | Team | Apps | (Gls) |
| 2022 | Standard Liège | 1 | (0) |
| 2024–2026 | MVV | 56 | (15) |
| 2026– | Sarpsborg 08 | 0 | (0) |

International career
| 2020 | Morocco U17 | 1 | (0) |
| 2022 | Morocco U20 | 1 | (0) |
- * Club domestic league appearances and goals as of 30 January 2026

Camil Mmaee A Nwameben (Arabic: كامل مايي; born 21 February 2004) is a professional footballer who plays as a forward for Norwegian Eliteserien club Sarpsborg 08. Born in Belgium, he is a youth international for Morocco.

== Club career ==
Mmaee joined the youth academy of Standard Liège in 2013 and signed his first professional contract with the club on 14 August 2021. He made his senior debut on 22 March 2022, appearing as a late substitute in a 1–0 Belgian First Division A victory over Beerschot.

On 29 July 2022, Mmaee signed a three-year contract, with an option for a further season, with Italian Serie A club Bologna, where he was assigned to the under-19 squad and did not make a senior appearance.

On 30 January 2024, Mmaee joined Dutch Eerste Divisie side MVV Maastricht on a short-term deal with an option to extend. His brother Samy had earlier represented the club in the 2017–18 season. Mmaee made his debut on 2 February, coming on as a substitute for Dailon Livramento in a 6–1 league win against Telstar and registering an assist for Bryan Smeets. His first goal for MVV came on 13 September 2024 in a 2–2 draw with Volendam. Mmaee ended the 2024–25 campaign as the club's joint top scorer, alongside Sven Braken, with 11 goals in 29 appearances.

On 1 February 2026, Mmaee signed a contract with Sarpsborg 08 in Norway until the end of 2029.

== International career ==
Mmaee was first called up to play for the Morocco U17s in 2020. He was called up to the Morocco U20s for a set of friendlies in March 2022. He made one appearance for the U20s against the Romania U20s in a 2–2 friendly tie on 29 March 2022.

== Personal life ==
Mmaee was born in Belgium to a Cameroonian-French father and Moroccan mother. Mmaee holds Cameroonian, French and Moroccan nationalities from his parents. His siblings Ryan, Samy, and Jack are also footballers.

== Career statistics ==
As of match played 25 November 2025

Appearances and goals by club, season and competition
| Club | Season | League | | | National cup | | Other | | Total | |
| Club | Season | Division | Apps | Goals | Apps | Goals | Apps | Goals | Apps | Goals |
|---|---|---|---|---|---|---|---|---|---|---|
| Standard Liège | 2021–22 | Belgian Pro League | 1 | 0 | 0 | 0 | — | | 1 | 0 |
| MVV | 2023–24 | Eerste Divisie | 13 | 0 | 0 | 0 | — | | 13 | 0 |
| MVV | 2024–25 | Eerste Divisie | 29 | 11 | 1 | 0 | — | | 30 | 11 |
| MVV | 2025–26 | Eerste Divisie | 14 | 4 | 1 | 0 | — | | 15 | 4 |
| MVV | Total | | 56 | 15 | 2 | 0 | — | | 58 | 15 |
| Sarpsborg 08 | 2026 | Eliteserien | 0 | 0 | 0 | 0 | — | | 0 | 0 |
| Career total | | | 57 | 15 | 2 | 0 | 0 | 0 | 59 | 15 |
