= Biel Teixeira =

Brazilian footballer (born 2001)

Personal information
- Full name: Gabriel Teixeira Aragão
- Date of birth: 1 April 2001 (age 25)
- Place of birth: Fortaleza, Brazil
- Height: 1.69 m (5 ft 7 in)
- Positions: Winger; attacking midfielder

Team information
- Current team: Pafos (on loan from Sporting CP)
- Number: 20

Youth career
- Brasília
- Bahia
- 2013–2021: Fluminense
- 2019: → Šamorín (loan)
- 2019: → Santo Ângelo (loan)

Senior career*
| Years | Team | Apps | (Gls) |
| 2021–2022 | Fluminense | 32 | (3) |
| 2022 | → Grêmio (loan) | 33 | (5) |
| 2022–2025 | Bahia | 72 | (14) |
| 2025– | Sporting CP | 3 | (0) |
| 2025–2026 | → Atlético Mineiro (loan) | 17 | (1) |
| 2026 | → Al Taawoun (loan) | 15 | (1) |
| 2026– | → Pafos (loan) | 3 | (0) |
- * Club domestic league appearances and goals as of 11 October 2026

Gabriel Teixeira Aragão (born 1 April 2001), also known as Biel Teixeira or just Biel, is a Brazilian footballer who plays as a winger or an attacking midfielder for Cypriot First Division club Pafos, on loan from Primeira Liga club Sporting CP.

== Career ==
=== Early career ===
Born in Fortaleza, in the state of Ceará, Biel represented Brasília and Bahia before joining Fluminense's youth setup at the age of 12. On 24 December 2020, after loans at ŠTK Šamorín and Santo Ângelo, he renewed his contract until December 2023.

=== Fluminense ===
Biel made his first team debut for Flu on 4 March 2021, starting in a 1–2 Campeonato Carioca away loss against Resende. Seven days later, he further extended his deal until 2024.

Biel scored his first senior goal on 25 April 2021, netting his team's fourth in a 4–1 home success over Madureira.

==== Loan to Grêmio ====
On 5 April 2022, Biel was announced at Grêmio on loan. He was a regular starter in the club's 2022 Série B run, achieving promotion to the top tier, but left the club in November.

=== Bahia ===
On 27 December 2022, Biel returned to Bahia on a six-year contract, now assigned to the first team. He scored twice and provided one assist in his first three matches for the club, but was never an undisputed starter during his two-year spell.

=== Sporting CP ===
On 3 February 2025, Biel moved abroad for the first time of his career after being announced at Portuguese side Sporting CP; he signed a four-and-a-half-year contract with the club, for a rumoured fee of €8 million.

==== Loan to Atlético Mineiro ====
On 25 July 2025, Biel joined Atlético Mineiro on a one-year loan deal with an obligatory buyout clause. On 22 November, he came off the bench in extra time in the 2025 Copa Sudamericana final against Lanús; he missed two chances in the goalless draw and missed his penalty kick in the shoot-out, which Atlético Mineiro lost 5–4.

==== Loan to Al Taawoun ====
On 29 January 2026, Biel joined Saudi Pro League club Al Taawoun on a six-month loan deal.

==== Loan to Pafos ====
On 2 July 2026, Biel joined Cypriot First Division club Pafos on a season-long loan deal.

== Career statistics ==
As of 15 October 2026

Appearances and goals by club, season and competition
| Club | Season | League | | | State league | | National cup | | Continental | | Other | | Total | |
| Club | Season | Division | Apps | Goals | Apps | Goals | Apps | Goals | Apps | Goals | Apps | Goals | Apps | Goals |
|---|---|---|---|---|---|---|---|---|---|---|---|---|---|---|
| Fluminense | 2021 | Série A | 15 | 1 | 15 | 2 | 5 | 1 | 9 (Note: Appearance(s) in Copa Libertadores) | 1 | — | | 44 | 5 |
| Fluminense | 2022 | Série A | 0 | 0 | 2 | 0 | 0 | 0 | 1 | 0 | — | | 3 | 0 |
| Fluminense | Total | | 15 | 1 | 17 | 2 | 5 | 1 | 10 | 1 | — | | 47 | 5 |
| Grêmio (loan) | 2022 | Série B | 33 | 5 | — | | — | | — | | — | | 33 | 5 |
| Bahia | 2023 | Série A | 25 | 5 | 11 | 3 | 6 | 3 | — | | 6 (Note: Appearance(s) in Copa do Nordeste) | 0 | 48 | 11 |
| Bahia | 2024 | Série A | 26 | 5 | 8 | 1 | 6 | 0 | — | | 8 | 0 | 48 | 6 |
| Bahia | 2025 | Série A | 0 | 0 | 2 | 0 | 0 | 0 | 0 | 0 | 1 | 0 | 3 | 0 |
| Bahia | Total | | 51 | 10 | 21 | 4 | 12 | 3 | 0 | 0 | 15 | 0 | 99 | 17 |
| Sporting CP | 2024–25 | Primeira Liga | 3 | 0 | — | | 2 | 0 | 1 (Note: Appearances in UEFA Champions League) | 0 | — | | 6 | 0 |
| Atlético Mineiro (loan) | 2025 | Série A | 17 | 1 | — | | 2 | 0 | 5 (Note: Appearances in Copa Sudamericana) | 0 | — | | 24 | 1 |
| Al Taawoun (loan) | 2025–26 | Saudi Pro League | 15 | 1 | — | | — | | — | | — | | 15 | 1 |
| Pafos (loan) | 2026–27 | Cypriot First Division | 3 | 0 | 0 | 0 | — | | 6 (Note: Four appearances and two goals in UEFA Europa League, two appearances and one goal in UEFA Conference League) | 3 | — | | 9 | 3 |
| Career total | | | 137 | 18 | 38 | 6 | 21 | 4 | 22 | 4 | 15 | 0 | 233 | 32 |

== Honours ==
Grêmio

- Recopa Gaúcha: 2022

Bahia

- Campeonato Baiano: 2023

Sporting CP

- Primeira Liga: 2024–25
- Taça de Portugal: 2024–25

Pafos

- Cypriot Super Cup: 2026
