= Samy Mmaee =

Moroccan footballer

Personal information
- Full name: Samy Alexandre Mmaee A'Nwambeben
- Date of birth: 8 September 1996 (age 30)
- Place of birth: Halle, Belgium
- Height: 1.88 m (6 ft 2 in)
- Position: Centre-back

Team information
- Current team: Pafos (on loan from Dinamo Zagreb)
- Number: 3

Youth career
- 2003–2005: KV Zuun
- 2005–2010: RWDM Brussels
- 2010–2013: Gent
- 2013–2014: Standard Liège

Senior career*
Years	Team	Apps	(Gls)
2014–2018	Standard Liège	8	(0)
2017–2018	→ MVV (loan)	29	(3)
2018–2021	Sint-Truiden	40	(0)
2021–2024	Ferencváros	58	(4)
2024–	Dinamo Zagreb	14	(1)
2025–2026	→ Qarabağ (loan)	11	(1)
2026–	→ Pafos (loan)	1	(0)

International career^{‡}
2016	Belgium U19	4	(0)
2017–2018	Belgium U21	5	(0)
2020–	Morocco	10	(0)
- * Club domestic league appearances and goals as of 11 October 2026 ‡ National team caps and goals as of 10 December 2022 (UTC)

Samy Alexandre Mmaee A'Nwambeben (Arabic: سامى ماي; born 8 September 1996) is a professional footballer who plays as a centre-back for Pafos on loan from Croatian club Dinamo Zagreb. Born in Belgium, he represented Morocco at international level.

== Club career ==
Mmaee's first club was KV Zuun, moving at the age of nine with his younger brother Ryan to RWDM Brussels, where he would stay for five years, prior to joining Gent in 2010, and, in 2013, Standard Liège. On 25 July 2014, he made his Belgian Pro League debut with Standard Liège against Charleroi.

=== Ferencváros ===
Mmaae was signed by Nemzeti Bajnokság I club Ferencvárosi TC in 2021.

On 5 May 2023, he won the 2022–23 Nemzeti Bajnokság I with Ferencváros, after Kecskemét lost 1–0 to Honvéd at the Bozsik Aréna on the 30th matchday.

On 20 April 2024, the Ferencváros–Kisvárda tie ended with a goalless draw at the Groupama Aréna on the 29th match day of the 2023–24 Nemzeti Bajnokság I season which meant that Ferencváros won their 35th championship.

On 15 May 2024, Ferencváros were defeated by Paks 2–0 in the 2024 Magyar Kupa Final at the Puskás Aréna.

At the end of the 2023–24 Nemzeti Bajnokság I season, he left the club.

=== Qarabağ ===
On 17 July 2025, Mmaee joined the Azerbaijan Premier League side Qarabağ on loan from Dinamo Zagreb.

=== Pafos ===
On 12 July 2026 Mmaee joined Cypriot First Division club Pafos on a season-long loan from Dinamo Zagreb with a purchase option.

== International career ==
Mmaee was born in Belgium to a Cameroonian-French father and Moroccan mother. Mmaee holds Cameroonian, French and Moroccan nationalities from his parents. He is a youth international for Belgium. He represented the Morocco national team in a friendly 3–1 win over Senegal on 9 October 2020.

== Personal life ==
Mmaee's brothers Ryan, Camil, and Jack Mmaee are also professional footballers., Pafos FC announced Mmaee's father's death on September 11th, 2026.

== Career statistics ==
As of match played 15 October 2026

Appearances and goals by club, season and competition
Club	Season	League			National cup (Note: Includes Belgian Cup, KNVB Cup, Magyar Kupa, Croatian Football Cup)		Continental		Other		Total	
Club	Season	Division	Apps	Goals	Apps	Goals	Apps	Goals	Apps	Goals	Apps	Goals
Standard Liège	2014–15	Belgian Pro League	3	0	0	0	—		—		3	0
Standard Liège	2015–16	Belgian Pro League	4	0	0	0	—		—		4	0
Standard Liège	2016–17	Belgian Pro League	1	0	0	0	—		—		1	0
Standard Liège	Total		8	0	0	0	—		—		8	0
MVV (loan)	2017–18	Eerste Divisie	29	3	1	2	—		—		30	5
Sint-Truiden	2018–19	Belgian Pro League	7	0	0	0	—		—		7	0
Sint-Truiden	2019–20	Belgian Pro League	22	0	2	0	—		—		24	0
Sint-Truiden	2020–21	Belgian Pro League	11	0	0	0	—		—		11	0
Sint-Truiden	Total		40	0	2	0	—		—		42	0
Ferencváros	2020–21	Nemzeti Bajnokság I	9	0	2	0	—		—		11	0
Ferencváros	2021–22	Nemzeti Bajnokság I	23	0	4	0	11 (Note: Five appearances in UEFA Champions League, six appearances in UEFA Europa League)	0	—		38	0
Ferencváros	2022–23	Nemzeti Bajnokság I	16	2	2	0	11 (Note: Five appearances in UEFA Champions League, six appearances and one goal in UEFA Europa League)	1	—		29	3
Ferencváros	2023–24	Nemzeti Bajnokság I	10	2	2	0	13 (Note: Two appearances in UEFA Champions League, eleven appearances and one goal in UEFA Conference League)	1	—		25	3
Ferencváros	Total		58	4	10	0	35	2	—		103	6
Dinamo Zagreb	2024–25	Croatian Football League	14	1	1	0	5 (Note: Appearances in UEFA Champions League)	0	—		20	1
Qarabağ (loan)	2025–26	Azerbaijan Premier League	11	1	1	0	3	0	—		15	1
Pafos (loan)	2026–27	Cypriot First Division	1	0	0	0	4 (Note: One appearance in UEFA Europa League, three appearances in UEFA Conference League)	0	1 (Note: Appearance in Cypriot Super Cup)	0	6	0
Career total			161	9	15	2	47	2	1	0	224	13

== Honours ==
Standard Liège

- Belgian Cup: 2015–16

Ferencvàros

- Nemzeti Bajnokság: 2020–21, 2021–22, 2022–23, 2023–24
- Magyar Kupa: 2021–22

Pafos

- Cypriot Super Cup: 2026
