= Jack Mmaee =

Belgian footballer (born 1994)

Personal information
- Date of birth: 16 November 1994 (age 31)
- Place of birth: Belgium
- Position: Midfielder

Team information
- Current team: Wiltz 71
- Number: 23

Youth career
- Genk
- Roda JC Kerkrade

Senior career*
Years	Team	Apps	(Gls)
2017–2019	Wiltz 71	51	(28)
2019–2020	Progrès Niederkorn	14	(4)
2020–2021	Racing FC Union Luxembourg	4	(1)
2021	K.S.K. Heist	14	(4)
2021–2023	K. Rupel Boom FC	23	(3)
2024–	Wiltz 71	19	(2)
- * Club domestic league appearances and goals as of 1 January 2025

Jack Mmaee (born 16 November 1994) is a Belgian professional footballer who plays as a winger for Luxembourg National Division club Wiltz 71.

== Club career ==
Mmaee played for both Genk and Roda JC Kerkrade at youth level before joining Luxembourgish club, FC Wiltz, making it his first professional club in 2017. In his debut season, he scored 5 goals in his first 3 games.

He played 51 games and scored 28 goals for Wiltz from 2017 to 2019 before departing to join fellow Luxembourgish team Progrès Niederkorn.

Mmaee signed with Racing FC Union Luxembourg from Niederkorn on 7 July 2020, after scoring 4 goals in 14 games.

Mmaee left RCFU Luxembourg mutually and became a free agent in Summer 2021. He signed with K.S.K. Heist in Belgium on 20 January 2022. Mmaee scored his first goal for Heist in a win against RFC Liège.

After only 6 months at the club, Mmaee departed and joined K. Rupel Boom F.C. on a 2-year deal.

Mmaee left Rupel Boom FC in July 2023, and remained a free agent until returning to his former club, FC Wiltz on 29 January 2024.

== Personal life ==
Jack Mmaee is one of the four Mmaee brothers, all of them being footballers: Ryan, who plays for Stoke City and the Morocco national team, Samy, who plays for Ferencvárosi TC and Morocco, and Camil, who plays for MVV Maastricht and the Morocco national under-20 team.

Born in Belgium, Mmaee is eligible to represent them internationally. However, he could also choose to represent Morocco (like his brothers) or Cameroon, as he has Cameroonian roots via his father.
