= 2026–27 Cypriot Cup =

83rd edition of the Cypriot Cup

2026–27 Cyprus Coca-Cola Cup

Tournament details
- Country: Cyprus
- Dates: 14 October 2026
- Teams: 26

The 2026–27 Cypriot Cup is the 85th edition of the Cypriot Cup. It is contested by 26 teams from the Cypriot First and Second Division. It began on 14 October 2026 and the final will take place at the GSP Stadium in Nicosia.

The defending champions are Pafos, having won their second title in the previous edition.

== Format ==
The tournament begins with 20 teams entering the first round; six teams receive a bye to the second round. In the first round, the ties are one-legged, and First Division clubs are drawn against Second Division clubs.

The second round is contested by 16 teams: the ones which qualified from the first round, and those which were exempt from the first round. The ties in the second round are one-legged, and from this point onwards, there are no restrictions on the draws. The ties in the quarter-finals are also one-legged. The semi-finals are the only round of the tournament, where the ties will be two-legged.

The final is contested in a single game, and will take place at the GSP Stadium. The winners qualify for the first qualifying round of the 2027–28 UEFA Europa League.

If, in any round, a winner is not determined after 90 minutes, the two teams play extra time. If a winner is still not determined after extra time, a penalty shootout takes place. There is no away goals rule.

== First round ==
The draw for the first round took place on 25 September 2026. The previous season's cup finalists (Pafos and Apollon Limassol), 2026–27 UEFA Champions League qualifiers Omonia, one club from the 2026–27 Cypriot First Division (Anorthosis Famagusta) and two clubs from the 2026–27 Cypriot Second Division (ASIL Lysi and Enosis Neon Paralimni) received a bye.

Team 1	Score	Team 2
14 October 2026
Spartakos Kitiou (2)	0–2	Krasava ENY Ypsonas (1)
Aris Limassol (1)	4–0	Ethnikos Achnas (2)
21 October 2026
Nea Salamis Famagusta (1)	4–0	APEA Akrotiri (2)
AEK Larnaca (1)	3–2 (a.e.t.)	Akritas Chlorakas (2)
28 October 2026
Omonia Aradippou (1)	6–3	Digenis Akritas Morphou (2)
APOEL (1)	5–2	Chalkanoras Idaliou (2)
3 November 2026
AEL Limassol (1)	2–1	Iraklis Gerolakkou (2)
Karmiotissa Pano Polemidia (1)	2–0	Ermis Aradippou (2)
4 November 2026
Doxa Katokopias (2)	0–2	Olympiakos Nicosia (1)
5 November 2026
Omonia 29M (1)	6–2	AEP Polemidion (2)

== Second round ==
The 10 first round winners and the 6 teams that received first round byes entered the second round. The draw took place on 13 November 2026.

Team 1	Score	Team 2
25 November 2026
Karmiotissa Pano Polemidia (1)	–	Apollon Limassol (1)
AEK Larnaca (1)	–	Anorthosis Famagusta (1)
APOEL (1)	–	Aris Limassol (1)
AEL Limassol (1)	–	Enosis Neon Paralimni (2)
Omonia (1)	–	Olympiakos Nicosia (1)
Krasava ENY Ypsonas (1)	–	ASIL Lysi (2)
Omonia Aradippou (1)	–	Omonia 29M (1)
Nea Salamis Famagusta (1)	–	Pafos (1)
