= Jónatas Noro =

Portuguese footballer (born 2005)

Personal information
- Full name: Jónatas Xavier Zamith Oliveira Noro
- Date of birth: 9 July 2005 (age 21)
- Place of birth: Rio Maior, Portugal
- Height: 1.87 m (6 ft 2 in)
- Position: Centre-back

Team information
- Current team: Pafos

Youth career
- 2012–2019: NS Rio Maior
- 2018–2019: → Palmeiras FC (loan)
- 2019–2024: Braga
- 2020–2021: → Palmeiras FC (loan)

Senior career*
Years	Team	Apps	(Gls)
2024–2026	Braga B	28	(0)
2024–2026	Braga	2	(0)
2026–	Pafos	2	(1)

International career^{‡}
2022	Portugal U18	3	(0)
2023–	Portugal U20	13	(0)
2025–	Portugal U21	1	(0)
- * Club domestic league appearances and goals as of 10 November 2026 ‡ National team caps and goals as of 11 June 2026

Jónatas Xavier Zamith Oliveira Noro (born 9 July 2005) is a Portuguese professional footballer who plays for Cypriot First Division club Pafos as a centre-back.

== Career ==
Noro was born in Portugal to Malagasy and Malagasy Portuguese roots. A youth product of his local club NS Rio Maior and Palmeiras FC, Noro joined the youth academy of Braga in 2019. On 30 June 2021, he signed his first professional contract with Braga. On 13 March 2023, he extended his contract with Braga until 2027. He was promoted to the Braga B team for the 2024–25 season. On 22 August 2024, he made the senior matchday squad for the first time in a UEFA Europa League match against Rapid Wien. On 19 October 2024, he debuted with the senior Braga team in a 2–1 Taça de Portugal win over 1º Dezembro.

On 9 September 2026, Noro signed a three-year contract with Pafos in Cyprus.

== International career ==
Noro is a youth international for Portugal, having played up to the Portugal U20s in 2024.
