= Ryan Mmaee =

Moroccan footballer (born 1997)

Personal information
- Full name: Ryan Mmaee A'Nwambeben Kabir
- Date of birth: 1 November 1997 (age 29)
- Place of birth: Geraardsbergen, Belgium
- Height: 1.85 m (6 ft 1 in)
- Position: Forward

Team information
- Current team: Atlas
- Number: 8

Youth career
- 2004–2005: KV Zuun
- 2005–2010: RWDM Brussels
- 2010–2013: Gent
- 2013–2015: Standard Liège

Senior career*
Years	Team	Apps	(Gls)
2015–2019	Standard Liège	13	(1)
2017–2018	→ Waasland-Beveren (loan)	18	(1)
2018–2019	→ AGF (loan)	9	(0)
2019–2021	AEL Limassol	50	(19)
2021–2023	Ferencváros	45	(25)
2023–2025	Stoke City	27	(3)
2024–2025	→ Rapid Wien (loan)	0	(0)
2025–2026	Omonia	30	(25)
2026–	Atlas	9	(3)

International career^{‡}
2015–2016	Belgium U19	5	(2)
2016–2017	Belgium U21	2	(1)
2016–	Morocco	12	(4)
- * Club domestic league appearances and goals as of 03:34, 21 October 2026 (UTC) ‡ National team caps and goals as of 10 December 2022

Ryan Mmaee A'Nwambeben Kabir (Arabic: ريان ماي; born 1 November 1997) is a professional footballer who plays as a forward for Liga MX club Atlas. Born in Belgium, he represents Morocco internationally.

Mmaee began his professional career in 2015 with Standard Liège, making his debut at the age of 17. Disagreements with the club management saw him loaned out to Waasland-Beveren and Danish side AGF. He moved to Cyprus in 2019 joining AEL Limassol. After scoring 17 goals in 2020–21 he earned a move to Hungarian champions Ferencváros in July 2021. He spent two seasons with Ferencváros, winning back-to-back league titles and a Magyar Kupa before signing for English side Stoke City in July 2023.

== Club career ==
=== Early life and career ===
Mmaee was born in Geraardsbergen, Belgium to a Cameroonian-French father Nwambebeg Mmaee, and a Moroccan mother Fatima. After his birth, his family moved to Sint-Pieters-Leeuw. At school, he studied mathematical sciences at the Royal Athenaeum in Halle. It was in Sint-Pieters-Leeuw that Mmaee began playing football, with the amateur club KV Zuun. A year later, he enrolled in the academy of RWDM Brussels. In 2010, he joined Gent. Three years later, he joined Standard Liège with his brother Samy Mmaee.

=== Standard Liège ===
Mmaee made his Belgian Pro League debut on 21 May 2015, at the age of 17 against Gent replacing Mehdi Carcela after 82 minutes in a 2–0 away defeat. Mmaee and his brother, Samy signed professional three-year contracts with Standard in August 2015. In the 2015–16 season he made seven appearances as Standard finished in seventh position. After playing in a few matches at the start of 2016–17, Mmaee was dropped from the first team back to the u-23s after he had an argument with manager Aleksandar Janković and an altercation with the physical trainer. Mmaee later explained what happened— "At 19, we want to play every game. When you don't play, you are disappointed, and your reactions are not always appropriate. I was young, I was learning on the job, I made mistakes when, I think, the club did not trust young people enough. I was upset in training because I was not selected in the group, I let it be known, and there were bound to be consequences. I thought it was all going to happen naturally. I was playing with the Belgian national team as a youth, I was upgraded to Standard, I thought it was going to happen so quickly in the professional world. It was not I don't care, but naivety".

He briefly returned to the first-team at the end of the season but after signing a contract extension he was loaned out to Waasland-Beveren with an option to buy. Mmaee played in 20 matches in 2017–18, scoring only once as Waasland-Beveren finished in 12th place and they decided against the purchase option and he returned to Standard. On 31 August 2018, Mmaee joined Danish Superliga side AGF Aarhus on loan for the 2018–19 season. He made 12 appearances, scoring three goals all of which came in the Danish Cup. Mmaee stated that he did not enjoy his time in Denmark—"My teammates were nice, but the people in Denmark were quite cold. When we arrived at the club in the morning, we didn't shake hands, and when I was driving and let a pedestrian cross the road, there was no small gesture of thanks."

=== AEL Limassol ===
After leaving Standard Liège, Mmaee signed a three-year contract with Cypriot First Division side AEL Limassol on 10 September 2019. He scored eight goals in 24 appearances in 2019–20 until the league was suspended on 15 May 2020 due to the COVID-19 pandemic. In 2020–21, Mmaee scored 17 goals as AEL Limassol finished in third place.

=== Ferencváros ===
Mmaee signed for Hungarian Nemzeti Bajnokság I champions Ferencváros in May 2021, linking up with his brother Samy. He scored on his debut for Fradi, on 6 July 2021 in a 3–0 win over Kosovan side Prishtina in the UEFA Champions League first qualifying round. He also scored twice in the next round against Žalgiris. He made his league debut on 31 July 2021, scoring a penalty in a 2–1 defeat to Kisvárda. Ferencváros progressed past Slavia Prague to make it to the Champions League play-off round but they were defeated 6–4 on aggregate by Young Boys, dropping down to the UEFA Europa League. They were unable to get out of the group containing Bayer Leverkusen, Celtic and Real Betis, finishing bottom after managing one victory. Mmaee ended the 2021–22 season with 19 goals from 37 matches as Ferencváros won the title with four games left. They won a double after beating Paks 3–0 in the Magyar Kupa final. In 2022–23 Mmaee scored 12 goals in 31 appearances as Ferencváros again won the league title.

=== Stoke City ===
On 28 July 2023, Mmaee joined English EFL Championship side Stoke City for an undisclosed fee on a three-year contract. He scored his first goal for Stoke on 29 August 2023 in a 6–1 win against Rotherham United in the EFL Cup. He scored his first Championship goal on 21 October 2023 in a 2–1 win against Sunderland. In February 2024 he was made to train with the under-21 squad by head coach Steven Schumacher for disciplinary reasons. Mmaee returned to the first-team in March vowing to 'prove a point'. However his season was ended prematurely due to injury. After struggling for game time at Stoke, Mmaee joined Austrian Bundesliga side Rapid Wien on loan for the 2024–25 season. His time at Rapid was disrupted by injuries and after failing to make an appearance he returned to Stoke in February 2025. His contract at Stoke was mutually terminated in August 2025.

=== Omonia ===
Mmaee returned to Cypriot football on 27 August 2025, joining Omonia on a two-year contract. He concluded his debut season as the league's top scorer with 23 goals, as his club secured their 22nd league title.

== International career ==
Mmaee is of Cameroonian, French and Moroccan descent, having a Cameroonian-French father and a Moroccan mother. Mmae holds Cameroonian, French and Moroccan nationalities from his parents. As such, he was eligible to represent either Belgium, Cameroon, France or Morocco at senior level. He made his debut for the senior Morocco national team in a 2–0 win against Sudan.

== Personal life ==
Mmaee's brothers, Samy, Camil and Jack are also a professional footballers. In May 2021 he was involved in a car accident in Limassol, Cyprus crashing into a car dealership and had to be extracted from his vehicle by emergency workers.

== Career statistics ==
=== Club ===
As of match played on 23 May 2026

Appearances and goals by club, season and competition
Club	Season	League			National cup (Note: Includes Belgian Cup, Danish Cup, Cypriot Cup, Magyar Kupa, FA Cup)		League cup (Note: Includes EFL Cup)		Europe		Other		Total	
Club	Season	Division	Apps	Goals	Apps	Goals	Apps	Goals	Apps	Goals	Apps	Goals	Apps	Goals
Standard Liège	2014–15	Belgian Pro League	1	0	0	0	—		—		—		1	0
Standard Liège	2015–16	Belgian Pro League	5	0	2	0	—		—		—		7	0
Standard Liège	2016–17	Belgian First Division A	7	1	2	1	—		—		—		9	2
Standard Liège	2017–18	Belgian First Division A	0	0	0	0	—		—		—		0	0
Standard Liège	2018–19	Belgian First Division A	0	0	0	0	—		—		—		0	0
Standard Liège	Total		13	1	4	1	—		—		—		17	2
Waasland-Beveren (loan)	2017–18	Belgian First Division A	18	1	2	0	—		—		—		20	1
AGF (loan)	2018–19	Danish Superliga	9	0	3	3	—		—		—		12	3
AEL Limassol	2019–20	Cypriot First Division	20	5	3	3	—		—		1 (Note: Appearance in Cypriot Super Cup)	0	24	8
AEL Limassol	2020–21	Cypriot First Division	30	14	5	3	—		—		—		35	17
AEL Limassol	Total		50	19	8	6	—		—		1	0	59	25
Ferencváros	2021–22	Nemzeti Bajnokság I	21	13	2	1	—		14 (Note: Eight appearances and four goals in UEFA Champions League and six appearances and one goal in UEFA Europa League)	5	—		37	19
Ferencváros	2022–23	Nemzeti Bajnokság I	24	12	2	1	—		10 (Note: One appearance in UEFA Champions League and nine appearances in UEFA Europa League)	0	—		36	13
Ferencváros	Total		45	25	4	2	—		24	5	—		73	32
Stoke City	2023–24	Championship	24	3	1	0	2	1	—		—		27	4
Stoke City	2024–25	Championship	3	0	0	0	1	1	—		—		4	1
Stoke City	Total		27	3	1	0	3	2	—		—		31	5
Rapid Wien (loan)	2024–25	Austrian Bundesliga	0	0	0	0	—		0	0	—		0	0
Omonia	2025–26	Cypriot First Division	30	25	2	2	—		6 (Note: Appearances in UEFA Conference League)	0	—		38	27
Career total			192	70	24	14	3	2	30	5	1	0	249	91

=== International ===
As of match played on 27 June 2022

Appearances and goals by national team and year
National team	Year	Apps	Goals
Morocco
Morocco	2016	1	0
Morocco	2021	6	4
Morocco	2022	5	0
Total		12	4

Scores and results list Morocco's goal tally first, score column indicates score after each Mmaee goal.

List of international goals scored by Ryan Mmaee
No.	Date	Venue	Opponent	Score	Result	Competition
1	12 November 2021	Prince Moulay Abdellah Stadium, Rabat, Morocco	Sudan	1–0	3–0	2022 FIFA World Cup qualification
2	12 November 2021	Prince Moulay Abdellah Stadium, Rabat, Morocco	Sudan	2–0	3–0	2022 FIFA World Cup qualification
3	16 November 2021	Stade Mohamed V, Casablanca, Morocco	Guinea	1–0	3–0	2022 FIFA World Cup qualification
4	16 November 2021	Stade Mohamed V, Casablanca, Morocco	Guinea	2–0	3–0	2022 FIFA World Cup qualification

== Honours ==
Ferencváros

- Nemzeti Bajnokság I: 2021–22, 2022–23
- Magyar Kupa: 2021–22

Omonia

- Cypriot First Division: 2025–26

Individual

- Cypriot First Division top scorer: 2025–26
