= 2023–24 Watford F.C. season =

English football team season

Watford
2023–24 season
- Owner: Gino Pozzo
- Chairman: Scott Duxbury
- Head coach: Valérien Ismaël (until 9 March); Tom Cleverley (from 9 March)
- Stadium: Vicarage Road
- Championship: 15th
- FA Cup: Fourth round
- EFL Cup: First round
- Top goalscorer: League: Mileta Rajović (10); All: Mileta Rajović (11)
Home colours	Away colours	Third colours

The 2023–24 season was the 125th season in the history of Watford and their second consecutive season in the Championship. The club participated in the Championship, the FA Cup, and the EFL Cup.

== First-team squad ==
As of 4 May 2024

No.	Player	Position	Nationality	Date of birth (age)	Signed from	Since	Fee	Ends	Apps	Goals
Goalkeepers
1	Daniel Bachmann	GK	(Austria)	9 July 1994 (age 29)	Stoke City	2017	Free Transfer	2028	116	0
26	Ben Hamer	GK	(England)	20 November 1987 (age 36)	Swansea City	2022	Free Transfer	2024	22	0
Defenders
2	Jeremy Ngakia	RB	(England)	7 September 2000 (age 23)	West Ham United	2020	Free Transfer	2025	74	0
3	Francisco Sierralta	CB	(Chile)	6 May 1997 (age 27)	Udinese	2020	Undisclosed	2027	88	2
4	Wesley Hoedt	CB	(Netherlands)	6 March 1994 (age 30)	Anderlecht	2023	£2,000,000	2025	63	4
5	Ryan Porteous	CB	(Scotland)	25 March 1999 (age 25)	Hibernian	2023	£500,000	2027	57	5
6	Jamal Lewis	LB	(Northern Ireland)	25 January 1998 (age 26)	Newcastle United	2023	Loan	2024	38	0
15	Mattie Pollock	CB	(England)	28 September 2001 (age 22)	Grimsby Town	2021	£300,000	2026	24	0
42	James Morris	LB	(England)	23 November 2001 (age 22)	Southampton	2021	Free Transfer	2026	31	0
45	Ryan Andrews	RB	(England)	26 August 2004 (age 19)	Academy	2012	—	2028	51	3
55	Albert Eames	RB	(England)	20 September 2005 (age 18)	Academy	2014	—	2027	1	0
Midfielders
8	Jake Livermore	DM	(England)	14 November 1989 (age 34)	West Bromwich Albion	2023	Free Transfer	2024	32	3
11	Ismaël Koné	CM	(Canada)	16 June 2002 (age 21)	Montréal	2023	£8,000,000	2027	63	4
16	Giorgi Chakvetadze	AM	(Georgia (country))	29 August 1999 (age 24)	Gent	2024	Undisclosed	2026	37	1
18	Yáser Asprilla	AM	(Colombia)	19 November 2003 (age 20)	Envigado	2022	£3,000,000	2026	86	7
24	Tom Dele-Bashiru	CM	(Nigeria)	17 September 1999 (age 24)	Manchester City	2019	Free Transfer	2025	49	4
39	Edo Kayembe	CM	(Democratic Republic of the Congo)	3 June 1998 (age 25)	KAS Eupen	2022	£4,700,000	2026	71	5
Forwards
7	Tom Ince	RW	(England)	30 January 1992 (age 32)	Reading	2023	£500,000	2025	29	2
9	Mileta Rajović	ST	(Denmark)	17 July 1999 (age 24)	Kalmar FF	2023	£1,000,000	2028	43	11
12	Ken Sema	LW	(Sweden)	30 September 1993 (age 30)	Östersunds	2018	Undisclosed	2025	159	12
19	Vakoun Bayo	ST	(Ivory Coast)	10 January 1997 (age 27)	Sporting Charleroi	2022	£5,800,000	2027	67	11
25	Emmanuel Dennis	ST	(Nigeria)	15 November 1997 (age 26)	Nottingham Forest	2024	Loan	2024	55	14
34	Kwadwo Baah	LW	(Germany)	27 January 2003 (age 21)	Rochdale	2021	Free Transfer	2026	0	0
37	Matheus Martins	LW	(Brazil)	16 July 2003 (age 20)	Udinese	2023	Loan	2024	49	6
58	Zavier Massiah-Edwards	RW	(England)	16 January 2007 (age 17)	Academy	2016	—	2024	1	0
59	Jack Grieves	ST	(England)	5 December 2004 (age 19)	Academy	2020	—	2026	5	0
Out on Loan
10	Imran Louza	CM	(Morocco)	1 May 1999 (age 25)	Nantes	2021	£10,000,000	2028	60	6
13	João Ferreira	RB	(Portugal)	22 March 2001 (age 23)	Benfica	2023	£2,500,000	2027	5	1
17	Jorge Hurtado	ST	(Colombia)	6 September 2003 (age 20)	Real Cartagena	2023	Undisclosed	2029	1	0
28	Samuel Kalu	RW	(Nigeria)	26 August 1997 (age 26)	Bordeaux	2022	£3,000,000	2025	13	0
47	Shaq Forde	ST	(England)	5 May 2004 (age 20)	Academy	2012	—	2024	1	0
—	Ashley Fletcher	ST	(England)	2 October 1995 (age 28)	Middlesbrough	2021	Free Transfer	2026	6	2

== Transfers ==
=== In ===
Date	Position	Nationality	Player	From	Fee	Ref.
27 June 2023	RW	(England)	Tom Ince	(England) Reading	Undisclosed	
1 July 2023	CF	(Colombia)	Jorge Cabezas	(Colombia) Real Cartagena	Undisclosed	
1 July 2023	CF	(England)	Rhys Healey	(France) Toulouse	Free Transfer	
20 July 2023	LB	(England)	Charlie Stallard †	(England) St Neots Town	Free Transfer	
21 July 2023	DM	(England)	Jake Livermore	(England) West Bromwich Albion	Free Transfer	
9 August 2023	CB	(Scotland)	Ali Gould †	(Scotland) Motherwell	Free Transfer	
25 August 2023	CF	(Denmark)	Mileta Rajović	(Sweden) Kalmar	Undisclosed	
14 September 2023	CM	(Germany)	Junior Gyamfi †	Free agent	—N/a	
26 January 2024	LB	(England)	Freddie Buers †	(England) Kings Langley	Free Transfer	
1 February 2024	AM	(Georgia (country))	Giorgi Chakvetadze	(Belgium) Gent	Undisclosed	
2 February 2024	CB	(England)	James Clarridge †	(England) Nottingham Forest	Undisclosed	

† Signed initially for the Under-21s

=== Out ===
Date	Position	Nationality	Player	To	Fee	Ref.
14 June 2023	CF	(Brazil)	João Pedro	(England) Brighton & Hove Albion	Undisclosed	
30 June 2023	AM	(Peru)	Andrés Aguilar	Free agent	Released	
30 June 2023	CF	(Democratic Republic of the Congo)	Britt Assombalonga	(Turkey) Antalyaspor	Released	
30 June 2023	CM	(Curaçao)	Leandro Bacuna	(Netherlands) FC Groningen	Released	
30 June 2023	LB	(Albania)	Christos Batzelis	Free agent	Released	
30 June 2023	RW	(England)	Aaron Benn	Free agent	Released	
30 June 2023	CB	(Northern Ireland)	Craig Cathcart	(Belgium) KV Kortrijk	Released	
30 June 2023	CM	(England)	Tom Cleverley	Retired		
30 June 2023	DM	(Cyprus)	Max Delyfer	Free agent	Released	
30 June 2023	CM	(England)	Jordan Fankwe	(England) Salford City	Released	
30 June 2023	CM	(England)	Dan Gosling	(England) Notts County	Released	
30 June 2023	CM	(England)	Ethan Goulding	Free agent	Released	
30 June 2023	CF	(England)	Damani Hunter	Free agent	Released	
30 June 2023	CM	(England)	Adian Manning	(England) Norwich City	Released	
30 June 2023	LB	(Romania)	Bogdan Marian	Free agent	Released	
30 June 2023	CM	(Northern Ireland)	JJ McKiernan	(England) Morecambe	Released	
30 June 2023	CB	(England)	Harvey Peters	Free agent	Released	
30 June 2023	CF	(Italy)	Ezio Touray	(England) Weymouth	Released	
1 July 2023	CM	(Colombia)	Juergen Elitim	(Poland) Legia Warsaw	Undisclosed	
1 July 2023	RB	(Spain)	Mario Gaspar	(Spain) Elche	Mutual Consent	
1 July 2023	CM	(Portugal)	Domingos Quina	(Italy) Udinese	Undisclosed	
4 July 2023	CB	(Nigeria)	William Troost-Ekong	(Greece) PAOK	Undisclosed	
15 July 2023	LW	(England)	Adrian Blake	(Netherlands) Utrecht	Free Transfer	
19 July 2023	RW	(England)	Joseph Hungbo	(Germany) 1. FC Nürnberg	Undisclosed	
25 July 2023	CB	(Belgium)	Christian Kabasele	(Italy) Udinese	Undisclosed	
25 July 2023	RW	(Senegal)	Ismaïla Sarr	(France) Marseille	Undisclosed	
17 August 2023	RW	(Argentina)	Ignacio Pussetto	(Argentina) Huracán	Mutual Consent	
24 August 2023	GK	(Nigeria)	Maduka Okoye	(Italy) Udinese	Undisclosed	
19 January 2024	CF	(England)	Rhys Healey	(England) Huddersfield Town	Undisclosed	

=== Loaned in ===
Date	Position	Nationality	Player	From	Date until	Ref.
4 July 2023	LW	(Brazil)	Matheus Martins	(Italy) Udinese	End of season	
27 July 2023	LB	(Northern Ireland)	Jamal Lewis	(England) Newcastle United	End of season	
2 August 2023	AM	(Georgia (country))	Giorgi Chakvetadze	(Belgium) Gent	1 February 2024 (Note: On 1 February, Chakbetadze joined the club on a permanent basis.)	
24 January 2024	LW	(Nigeria)	Emmanuel Dennis	(England) Nottingham Forest	End of season	

=== Loaned out ===
Date	Position	Nationality	Player	To	Date until	Ref.
1 July 2023	CM	(Colombia)	Óber Almanza	(Colombia) Orsomarso	31 December 2023	
25 July 2023	CF	(England)	Ashley Fletcher	(England) Sheffield Wednesday	End of season	
1 August 2023	RB	(Portugal)	João Ferreira	(Italy) Udinese	End of season	
3 August 2023	CF	(Colombia)	Jorge Cabezas Hurtado	(United States) New York Red Bulls	31 December 2023	
4 August 2023	CB	(Wales)	George Abbott	(England) Chippenham Town	1 September 2023 (Note: On 1 September, Abbott was recalled from his loan at Chippenham Town, which has been set to run until 5 November.)	
14 August 2023	CF	(England)	Shaq Forde	(England) Leyton Orient	End of season	
18 August 2023	LW	(Germany)	Kwadwo Baah	(England) Burton Albion	11 January 2024 (Note: On 11 January, Baah was recalled from his season-long loan at Burton.)	
7 September 2023	RW	(Nigeria)	Samuel Kalu	(Switzerland) Lausanne-Sport	End of season	
24 October 2023	RB	(England)	Hamzat Balogun	(England) Bedford Town	2 January 2024 (Note: On 24 November, Balogun's loan at Bedford Town, initially set to run until 30 November, was extended until 2 January.)	
28 October 2023	GK	(South Africa)	Roraigh Browne	(England) Northwood	5 February 2024 (Note: Browne's initial month-long loan at Northwood, beginning in late October, was twice extended for a further month, on 23 November and 12 January.)	
3 November 2023	LB	(England)	Charlie Stallard	(England) Hayes & Yeading United	3 December 2023	
10 November 2023	CF	(England)	James Collins	(England) Royston Town	10 December 2023	
13 December 2023	RB	(England)	Scott Holding	(England) Dover Athletic	End of season (Note: On 12 January, Holding's loan at Dover, initially set to run until 9 January, was extended until the end of the season.)	
29 December 2023	CB	(Wales)	George Abbott	(England) Potters Bar Town	28 January 2024	
15 January 2024	CM	(Morocco)	Imran Louza	(France) Lorient	End of season	
19 January 2024	RW	(Poland)	Dawid Hamiga	(England) Slough Town	13 February 2024	
30 January 2024	CF	(England)	James Collins	(England) Haringey Borough	29 February 2024	
1 February 2024	CF	(Colombia)	Jorge Cabezas Hurtado	(England) Gillingham	End of season	
15 February 2024	GK	(South Africa)	Roraigh Browne	(England) Walthamstow	30 April 2024 (Note: On 18 March, Browne's loan at Walthamstow, initially set to run until 15 March, was extended until the end of April.)	
17 February 2024	CF	(England)	Michael Adu-Poku	(England) Kings Langley	17 March 2024	
17 February 2024	GK	(Cyprus)	Gabriel Ortelli	(England) Kings Langley	End of season (Note: On 22 March, Oretlli's loan at Kings Langley, initially set to run until 17 March, was extended until the end of the season.)	
8 March 2024	GK	(Sweden)	Jonathan Macaulay	(England) Hemel Hempstead Town	1 May 2024	
12 March 2024	CM	(Germany)	Junior Gyamfi	(England) Hemel Hempstead Town	1 May 2024	
19 March 2024	LB	(England)	Charlie Stallard	(England) Bedford Town	End of season	
28 March 2024	CF	(England)	Tobi Adeyemo	(England) Wealdstone	24 April 2024	
28 March 2024	LB	(England)	Josh Mullins	(England) Bedford Town	1 May 2024	
29 March 2024	CF	(England)	Michael Adu-Poku	(England) Maidstone United	End of season	

== Pre-season and friendlies ==
On 30 May, Watford announced their first two pre-season friendlies, against Boreham Wood and Stevenage. However, the friendly against Stevenage was later cancelled as they were drawn against each other in the 1st round of EFL Cup.

Win Draw Loss Fixtures

5 July 2023 Friendly	Boreham Wood	0–0	Watford	Borehamwood
19:30 BST		Report		Stadium: Meadow Park; Attendance: 1,703

8 July 2023 Friendly	Arsenal	1–1	Watford	London Colney
14:00 BST	Marquinhos 54'	Report	Koné 42'	Stadium: Arsenal Training Centre; Attendance: 0 (Behind closed doors)

18 July 2023 Friendly	Stevenage	Cancelled	Watford	Stevenage
19:45 BST				Stadium: The Lamex Stadium
Note: Due to the two sides being drawn against each other in the 2023–24 EFL Cup the friendly was cancelled.

22 July 2023 Friendly	Crystal Palace	2–1	Watford	Beckenham
13:00 BST	Édouard 54' 75'	Report	Kayembe 68'	Stadium: Crystal Palace FC Training Ground; Attendance: 0 (Behind closed doors)

29 July 2023 Friendly	Watford	3–0	Peterborough United	Watford
15:00 BST	Bayo 14', 67'; Martins 19'	Report		Stadium: Vicarage Road; Attendance: 0 (Behind closed doors)

== Competitions ==
=== Overall record ===
Competition	First match	Last match	Starting round	Final position	Record							
Competition	First match	Last match	Starting round	Final position	Pld	W	D	L	GF	GA	GD	Win %
Championship	5 August 2023	4 May 2024	Matchday 1	15th	46	13	17	16	61	61	+0	28.26
FA Cup	6 January 2024	6 February 2024	Third round	Fourth round	3	1	1	1	3	5	−2	33.33
EFL Cup	8 August 2023		First round	First round	1	0	1	0	1	1	+0	0.00
Total					50	14	19	17	65	67	−2	28.00

Source: Soccerway

=== Championship ===
==== League table ====
Pos	Team	Pld	W	D	L	GF	GA	GD	Pts
12	Cardiff City	46	19	5	22	53	70	−17	62
13	Millwall	46	16	11	19	45	55	−10	59
14	Swansea City	46	15	12	19	59	65	−6	57
15	Watford	46	13	17	16	61	61	0	56
16	Sunderland	46	16	8	22	52	54	−2	56
17	Stoke City	46	15	11	20	49	60	−11	56
18	Queens Park Rangers	46	15	11	20	47	58	−11	56

Source: EFL official website
Rules for classification: 1) Points; 2) Goal difference; 3) Number of goals scored; 4) Head-to-head results; 5) Wins; 6) Away goals; 7) Penalty points (sec 9.5); 8) Number of 12-point sending off offences; 9) Play-off (only if needed to determine promotion/relegation)

==== Results summary ====
Overall								Home						Away					
Pld	W	D	L	GF	GA	GD	Pts	W	D	L	GF	GA	GD	W	D	L	GF	GA	GD
46	13	17	16	61	61	0	56	6	9	8	32	28	+4	7	8	8	29	33	−4

Source: Soccerway

==== Results by round ====
Round	1	2	3	4	5	6	7	8	9	10	11	12	13	14	15	16	17	18	19	20	21	22	23	24	25	26	27	28	29	30	31	32	33	34	35	36	37	38	39	40	41	42	43	44	45	46
Ground	H	H	A	H	A	H	H	A	H	A	A	H	A	H	A	H	A	H	A	H	H	A	A	H	H	A	A	H	A	A	H	A	A	H	A	H	H	A	H	A	H	A	A	H	H	A
Result	W	D	L	L	D	W	D	L	L	L	D	W	W	D	D	W	L	W	W	D	L	W	W	L	D	D	W	D	D	L	L	L	W	L	L	D	L	W	D	D	D	D	L	D	W	L
Position	1	3	9	15	18	12	14	16	20	21	20	19	15	16	16	13	15	13	10	10	12	9	7	10	10	10	8	9	9	11	11	12	11	11	12	13	14	13	14	14	14	14	15	15	14	15

Source: Soccerway
A = Away; H = Home; W = Win; D = Draw; L = Loss

==== Matches ====
On 22 June, the EFL Championship fixtures were released.

Win Draw Loss Fixtures

5 August 2023 1	Watford	4–0	Queens Park Rangers	Watford
15:00 BST	Dele-Bashiru 1'; Louza 20'; Martins 38'; Morris (yellow card) 45+1'; Bayo 43'	Report	Dykes (yellow card) 67'; Armstrong (yellow card) 76'	Stadium: Vicarage Road; Attendance: 20,087; Referee: Thomas Bramall

12 August 2023 2	Watford	0–0	Plymouth Argyle	Watford
15:00 BST		Report	Scarr (yellow card) 71'; Mumba (yellow card) 78'	Stadium: Vicarage Road; Attendance: 19,446; Referee: Geoff Eltringham

19 August 2023 3	Stoke City	1–0	Watford	Stoke-on-Trent
15:00 BST	McNally (yellow card) 29'; Wesley (yellow card) 52'; Vidigal 53'; Thompson (yellow card) 77'; Johnson (yellow card) 83'	Report	Koné (yellow card) 60'	Stadium: Bet365 Stadium; Attendance: 21,193; Referee: James Bell

27 August 2023 4	Watford	0–1	Blackburn Rovers	Watford
12:00 BST	Hoedt (yellow card) 24'; Louza (yellow card) 69'; Andrews (yellow card) 69'	Report	Hyam (yellow card) 63'; Hedges 72'; Rankin-Costello (yellow card) 77'	Stadium: Vicarage Road; Attendance: 17,810; Referee: Gavin Ward

2 September 2023 5	Coventry City	3–3	Watford	Coventry
15:00 BST	Godden (penalty missed) 20' 87'; Eccles (yellow card) 24'; van Ewijk 41'; McFadzean (yellow card) 60'; Hoedt 64' (o.g.); Sheaf (yellow card) 76'	Report	Porteous (yellow card) 30'; Rajović 35', 79'; Sierralta (yellow card) 40'; Martins 52'; Hoedt (yellow card) 90+4'	Stadium: Coventry Building Society Stadium; Attendance: 24,539; Referee: David Webb

16 September 2023 6	Watford	2–0	Birmingham City	Watford
15:00 BST	Hoedt (yellow card) 55'; Rajović 90+1'; Andrews 90+6'	Report	Drameh (yellow card) 5'; Buchanan (yellow card) 35' (yellow-red card) 88'; Bielik (yellow card) 38'; Stansfield (yellow card) 57'; Šunjić (yellow card) 60'; Longelo (yellow card) 90+3'	Stadium: Vicarage Road; Attendance: 18,932; Referee: Keith Stroud

20 September 2023 7	Watford	2–2	West Bromwich Albion	Watford
19:45 BST	Ince 3'; Martins 23'; Porteous (yellow card) 53'; Louza (yellow card) 90+5'	Report	Swift 14'; Wallace 17'; Molumby (yellow card) 26'	Stadium: Vicarage Road; Attendance: 16,742; Referee: Leigh Doughty

23 September 2023 8	Leeds United	3–0	Watford	Leeds
15:00 BST	Rutter (yellow card) 40'; Piroe 67'; Byram 70'; Anthony 89'	Report	Andrews (yellow card) 43'; Bachmann (yellow card) 67'; Bayo (yellow card) 88'	Stadium: Elland Road; Attendance: 36,236; Referee: Jeremy Simpson

30 September 2023 9	Watford	2–3	Middlesbrough	Watford
15:00 BST	Bayo 19'; Porteous (yellow card) 40'; Hoedt 52'; Sierralta (yellow card) 55'	Report	McGree 5', 12'; Coburn 63'	Stadium: Vicarage Road; Attendance: 18,446; Referee: Oliver Langford

4 October 2023 10	Sunderland	2–0	Watford	Sunderland
19:45 BST	Huggins 43'; Burstow (yellow card) 50'; Ba 62'	Report	Ngakia (yellow card) 27'; Dele-Bashiru (yellow card) 58'; Bachmann (yellow card) 74'; Louza (yellow card) 74'; Porteous (yellow card) 83'; Andrews (red card) 87'	Stadium: Stadium of Light; Attendance: 38,120; Referee: Andy Davies

7 October 2023 11	Cardiff City	1–1	Watford	Leckwith
15:00 BST	McGuinness 26'	Report	Sierralta (yellow card) 39'; Bayo 54'; Lewis (yellow card) 65'	Stadium: Cardiff City Stadium; Attendance: 19,804; Referee: Gavin Ward

21 October 2023 12	Watford	1–0	Sheffield Wednesday	Watford
15:00 BST	Porteous (yellow card) 45'; Lewis (yellow card) 50'; Asprilla 82'	Report	Hendrick (yellow card) 68'	Stadium: Vicarage Road; Attendance: 19,102; Referee: Dean Whitestone

24 October 2023 13	Swansea City	0–1	Watford	Landore
19:45 BST		Report	Livermore (yellow card) 30'; Hoedt (yellow card) 73'; Sema 82'; Kayembe (yellow card) 86'	Stadium: Swansea.com Stadium; Attendance: 14,698; Referee: Andrew Kitchen

28 October 2023 14	Watford	2–2	Millwall	Watford
15:00 GMT	Asprilla 7', (yellow card) 50'; Livermore (yellow card) 37'; Sema (yellow card) 79'; Rajović 90+2'	Report	Flemming 12', (yellow card) 27'; Saville (yellow card) 38'; Harding 86'; Norton-Cuffy (yellow card) 90+3'	Stadium: Vicarage Road; Attendance: 18,620; Referee: Keith Stroud

4 November 2023 15	Huddersfield Town	0–0	Watford	Huddersfield
15:00 GMT		Report	Livermore (yellow card) 57'; Chakvetadze (yellow card) 67'	Stadium: The John Smith's Stadium; Attendance: 18,225; Referee: Sunny Gill

11 November 2023 16	Watford	5–0	Rotherham United	Watford
15:00 GMT	Rajovic 10', 45+4'; Kayembe 54'; Porteous (yellow card) 58'; Asprilla (yellow card) 61'; Ince 86'; Martins 90+4'	Report	Cafú (yellow card) 45'	Stadium: Vicarage Road; Attendance: 17,349; Referee: Stephen Martin

25 November 2023 17	Leicester City	2–0	Watford	Leicester
15:00 GMT	Ndidi (yellow card) 62'; Vardy (yellow card) 68' (goal) 76', 90+5' (pen.)	Report	Louza (yellow card) 30'; Porteous (yellow card) 54'; Chakvetadze (yellow card) 72'; Kayembe (yellow card) 75'; Bachmann (yellow card) 83' (yellow-red card) 90+3'; Asprilla (yellow card) 90'	Stadium: King Power Stadium; Attendance: 31,577; Referee: Sam Allison

28 November 2023 18	Watford	3–2	Norwich City	Watford
20:00 GMT	Livermore (yellow card) 18'; Koné 30'; Rajović 33'; Asprilla 77'	Report	Batth 3'; Hwang Ui-jo 12'; Stacey (yellow card) 35'; Duffy (yellow card) 64'; Giannoulis (yellow card) 90+4'; Sainz (yellow card) 90+4'	Stadium: Vicarage Road; Attendance: 16,714; Referee: Simon Hooper

2 December 2023 19	Hull City	1–2	Watford	Kingston upon Hull
15:00 GMT	Twine 10'; Philogene (penalty missed) 60'; Connolly (yellow card) 90+6'	Report	Kayembe 8'; Andrews (yellow card) 38'; Hoedt 74'; Hamer (yellow card) 85'	Stadium: MKM Stadium; Attendance: 20,057; Referee: John Busby

9 December 2023 20	Watford	1–1	Southampton	Watford
15:00 GMT	Porteous (yellow card) 59'; Koné (yellow card) 61'; Hoedt (yellow card) 87'; Healey 90+6'	Report	Charles (yellow card) 34'; A. Armstrong (yellow card) 45'; Adams 56'; S. Armstrong (yellow card) 87'; Fraser (yellow card) 90+3'	Stadium: Vicarage Road; Attendance: 19,797; Referee: Geoff Eltringham

12 December 2023 21	Watford	1–2	Ipswich Town	Watford
19:45 GMT	Asprilla 12'; Kayembe (yellow card) 46'; Bayo (yellow card) 84'	Report	Hirst 24' (yellow card) 45'; Chaplin (yellow card) 39'; Luongo (yellow card) 53'; Morsy 80'; Hutchinson (yellow card) 89'	Stadium: Vicarage Road; Attendance: 18,109; Referee: David Coote

16 December 2023 22	Preston North End	1–5	Watford	Preston
15:00 GMT	Keane 27'; Millar (yellow card) 41'; Whiteman (yellow card) 45+2'; Osmajić (yellow card) 90+1'	Report	Bayo 42', 71'; Martins 46'; Kayembe 53'; Koné 77'; Lewis (yellow card) 85'	Stadium: Deepdale; Attendance: 14,389; Referee: Sunny Singh Gill

23 December 2023 23	Blackburn Rovers	1–2	Watford	Blackburn
15:00 GMT	Wharton 3'; Garrett (yellow card) 36'; Moran (yellow card) 89'		Hoedt (yellow card) 65'; Rajović (yellow card) 81', (goal) 83'; Healey 87'; Andrews (yellow card) 87'	Stadium: Ewood Park; Attendance: 17,803; Referee: Dean Whitestone

26 December 2023 24	Watford	1–4	Bristol City	Watford
15:00 GMT	Chakvetadze 49'; Hoedt (yellow card) 80'	Report	Pring 28'; Hoedt 45+2' (o.g.); Sykes 50'; Weimann 83'	Stadium: Vicarage Road; Attendance: 19,626; Referee: John Busby

29 December 2023 25	Watford	1–1	Stoke City	Watford
19:45 GMT	Livermore 15', (yellow card) 49'; Koné (yellow card) 42'; Bayo (red card) 52'; Chakvetadze (yellow card) 72'; Morris (yellow card) 80'	Report	Tchamadeu (yellow card) 14'; Mmaee 34'	Stadium: Vicarage Road; Attendance: 19,643; Referee: Scott Oldham

1 January 2024 26	Plymouth Argyle	3–3	Watford	Plymouth
15:00 GMT	Azaz 20'; Whittaker 27'; Hardie 42'; Mumba (yellow card) 59'; Randell (yellow card) 86'	Report	Kayembe 11'; Koné 38'; Livermore (yellow card) 42'; Andrews 57'; Healey (yellow card) 87'; Martins (yellow card) 88'; Asprilla (yellow card) 88'	Stadium: Home Park; Attendance: 16,355; Referee: Robert Madley

14 January 2024 27	Queens Park Rangers	1–2	Watford	Shepherd's Bush
12:00 GMT	Field (yellow card) 5'; Paal (yellow card) 23'; Colback (yellow card) 39'; Dykes 77'	Report	Livermore (yellow card) 20'; Hoedt (yellow card) 45'; Dele-Bashiru (yellow card) 49'; Livermore 60', 65'	Stadium: MATRADE Loftus Stadium; Attendance: 17,409; Referee: Simon Hooper
Note: Fixture was originally scheduled for 13 January, but was moved back for TV selection.

20 January 2024 28	Bristol City	1–1	Watford	Bristol
15:00 GMT	Twine 25'; McCrorie (yellow card) 36'	Report	Dele-Bashiru 13' (pen.); Asprilla (yellow card) 14'; Andrews (yellow card) 40'	Stadium: Ashton Gate Stadium; Attendance: 23,611; Referee: Andrew Kitchen

31 January 2024 29	Sheffield Wednesday	0–0	Watford	Owlerton
19:45 GMT	Palmer (yellow card) 29'; Famewo (yellow card) 39'; Johnson (yellow card) 42'; Bannan (yellow card) 75'	Report	Matheus Martins (yellow card) 25'; Pollock (yellow card) 76'; Hamer (yellow card) 90'	Stadium: Hillsborough Stadium; Attendance: 22,303; Referee: Rebecca Welch
Note: Fixture was initially scheduled for 27 January, but was postponed due to both sides advancing in the FA Cup.

3 February 2024 30	Watford	0–1	Cardiff City	Watford
15:00 GMT	Chakvetadze (yellow card) 44'; Pollock (yellow card) 47'; Livermore (yellow card) 50'	Report	Bowler 41', (yellow card) 69'; Colwill (yellow card) 51'; Goutas (yellow card) 90+1'	Stadium: Vicarage Road; Attendance: 19,739; Referee: John Busby

10 February 2024 31	Watford	1–2	Leicester City	Watford
15:00 GMT	Dennis 63'; Porteous (yellow card) 75'; Hoedt (yellow card) 90+5'	Report	Daka 11' (pen.); Winks (yellow card) 37'; Nelson (yellow card) 45+5'; Pereira 55'; Vardy (yellow card) 90+5'	Stadium: Vicarage Road; Attendance: 20,597; Referee: Oliver Langford

13 February 2024 32	Norwich City	4–2	Watford	Norwich
19:45 GMT	Barnes (yellow card) 17', (goal) 20'; Sargent 28', (yellow card) 30'; Sara 77'; Fassnacht 82'; Gibbs (yellow card) 88'	Report	Rajović 42'; Martins (yellow card) 45+1'; Asprilla 71'; Porteous (yellow card) 79'	Stadium: Carrow Road; Attendance: 25,325; Referee: Stuart Attwell

17 February 2024 33	Rotherham United	0–1	Watford	Rotherham
15:00 GMT	Rinomhota (yellow card) 64'; Revan (yellow card) 68'	Report	Asprilla 58'; Hamer (yellow card) 73'	Stadium: AESSEAL New York Stadium; Attendance: 10,143; Referee: Andrew Kitchen

24 February 2024 34	Watford	1–2	Huddersfield Town	Watford
15:00 GMT	Kayembe (yellow card) 14'; Dennis 55'; Ince (yellow card) 57'	Report	Ward 70', 83'; Kasumu (yellow card) 73'; Spencer (yellow card) 81'	Stadium: Vicarage Road; Attendance: 18,970; Referee: Ben Toner

2 March 2024 35	Millwall	1–0	Watford	Bermondsey
15:00 GMT	Flemming 3', (yellow card) 90+1'; McNamara (yellow card) 45'; Leonard (yellow card) 75'	Report	Kayembe (yellow card) 1'	Stadium: The Den; Attendance: 17,847; Referee: Gavin Ward

6 March 2024 36	Watford	1–1	Swansea City	Watford
19:45 GMT	Chakvetadze (yellow card) 45+1'; Livermore (yellow card) 45+3'; Hoedt 57'; Andrews (yellow card) 67'; Porteous (yellow card) 83'	Report	Andrews 18' (o.g.); Tymon (yellow card) 32'; Wood (yellow card) 36'	Stadium: Vicarage Road; Attendance: 16,440; Referee: Tom Nield

9 March 2024 37	Watford	1–2	Coventry City	Watford
15:00 GMT	Porteous 20'; Hoedt (yellow card) 26'	Report	Kelly (yellow card) 18'; Palmer (yellow card) 23'; Wright 40', 72', (yellow card) 88'; Bidwell (yellow card) 45+1'; Thomas (yellow card) 66'	Stadium: Vicarage Road; Attendance: 18,907; Referee: Robert Madley

16 March 2024 38	Birmingham City	0–1	Watford	Bordesley
15:00 GMT		Report	Dennis 44'; Chakvetadze (yellow card) 45+1'; Asprilla (yellow card) 88'; Bachmann (yellow card) 90+4'	Stadium: St Andrew's Stadium; Attendance: 21,266; Referee: Matt Donohue

29 March 2024 39	Watford	2–2	Leeds United	Watford
20:00 GMT	Bayo 31'; Dennis 44'	Report	Summerville 37'; Joseph 85'	Stadium: Vicarage Road; Attendance: 20,236; Referee: David Webb
Note: Fixture was initially scheduled for a 15:00 kick-off, but was moved for live Sky Sports broadcasting.

1 April 2024 40	West Bromwich Albion	2–2	Watford	West Bromwich
15:00 GMT	Thomas-Asante 70'; Furlong 90+1'	Report	Dennis (yellow card) 30'; Kayembe 51'; Rajović 66'	Stadium: The Hawthorns; Attendance: 24,173; Referee: Gavin Ward

6 April 2024 41	Watford	0–0	Preston North End	Watford
15:00 BST	Asprilla (yellow card) 51'; Chakvetadze (yellow card) 87'	Report	Lindsay (yellow card) 89'	Stadium: Vicarage Road; Attendance: 19,374; Referee: James Bell

10 April 2024 42	Ipswich Town	0–0	Watford	Ipswich
19:45 BST	Clarke (yellow card) 33'; Moore (yellow card) 57'	Report	Porteous (yellow card) 67'	Stadium: Portman Road; Attendance: 28,589; Referee: Sam Barrott

13 April 2024 43	Southampton	3–2	Watford	Southampton
15:00 BST	Smallbone 1'; Adams 20'; Fraser (yellow card) 74'; Downes 90+9'	Report	Porteous 34', (yellow card) 55'; Hoedt (yellow card) 40'; Kayembe (yellow card) 70'; Koné 85'	Stadium: St Mary's Stadium; Attendance: 30,347; Referee: Josh Smith

20 April 2024 44	Watford	0–0	Hull City	Watford
15:00 BST	Hoedt (yellow card) 40'; Porteous (yellow card) 50'; Andrews (yellow card) 52'; Sierralta (yellow card) 72'	Report	Tufan (penalty missed) 11'; Greaves (yellow card) 42'; Jacob (yellow card) 62'; Morton (yellow card) 70'; Traoré (yellow card) 90+2'	Stadium: Vicarage Road; Attendance: 18,753; Referee: Ben Toner

27 April 2024 45	Watford	1–0	Sunderland	Watford
15:00 BST	Kayembe (yellow card) 10'; Andrews 64'; Lewis (yellow card) 86'	Report	O'Nien (yellow card) 58'	Stadium: Vicarage Road; Attendance: 20,712; Referee: Oliver Langford

4 May 2024 46	Middlesbrough	3–1	Watford	Middlesbrough
12:30 BST	Latte Lath 28'; Azaz (yellow card) 33'; Bangura 78'; Jones 84'	Report	Pollock (yellow card) 20'; Hoedt 73'	Stadium: Riverside Stadium; Attendance: 28,289; Referee: Keith Stroud

=== FA Cup ===
As a Championship club, Watford joined the FA Cup at the third round stage, and were drawn at home against Chesterfield and then to Southampton in the fourth round.

Win Draw Loss Fixtures

6 January 2024 Third round	Watford	2–1	Chesterfield	Watford
15:00 GMT	Koné (yellow card) 38'; Hoedt (yellow card) 45+1'; Rajović 76'; Dele-Bashiru 90+5'	Report	Quigley (yellow card) 26', (goal) 28'; Banks (yellow card) 45+1'; Naylor (yellow card) 52'; Boot (yellow card) 81'	Stadium: Vicarage Road; Attendance: 15,932; Referee: Gavin Ward

28 January 2024 Fourth round	Watford	1–1	Southampton	Watford
14:00 GMT	Matheus Martins 5'; Chakvetadze (yellow card) 45'	Report	Holgate (yellow card) 4'; Alcaraz (yellow card) 40'; Armstrong 89'	Stadium: Vicarage Road; Attendance: 16,688; Referee: Michael Salisbury

6 February 2024 Fourth round replay	Southampton	3–0	Watford	Southampton
19:45 GMT	Smallbone (yellow card) 21'; Dibling (yellow card) 51'; Mara 52', 58'; Adams 76'; Edozie (yellow card) 86'; Armstrong (yellow card) 87'	Report	Morris (yellow card) 46'; Chakvetadze (yellow card) 49'; Porteous (yellow card) 69'; Sierralta (yellow card) 75'	Stadium: St Mary's Stadium; Referee: Darren Bond

=== EFL Cup ===
Watford were drawn away to Stevenage in the first round.

Win Draw Loss Fixtures

8 August 2023 First round	Stevenage	1–1 (4–3 p)	Watford	Stevenage
19:45 BST	March 43'	Report	Bayo 6'	Stadium: Lamex Stadium; Attendance: 4,495; Referee: Charles Breakspear
	Penalties
	Reid (penalty missed); Roberts (penalty scored); Forster-Caskey (penalty scored); MacDonald (penalty scored); Thompson (penalty scored)		(penalty scored) Hoedt; (penalty scored) Sierralta; (penalty missed) Porteous; (penalty missed) Healey; (penalty scored) Koné

== Statistics ==
=== Appearances and goals ===
As of 4 May 2024

No.	Pos.	Nat.	Player	League		FA Cup		EFL Cup		Total		Discipline	
No.	Pos.	Nat.	Player	Apps	Goals	Apps	Goals	Apps	Goals	Apps	Goals	A yellow rectangle, denoting the yellow penalty card shown to a player being cautioned	A red rectangle, denoting the red penalty card shown to a player being sent off
1	GK	AUT	Daniel Bachmann	27	0	3	0	0	0	30	0	3	1
2	DF	ENG	Jeremy Ngakia	11+3	0	0	0	1	0	15	0	1	0
3	DF	CHI	Francisco Sierralta	23+4	0	3	0	1	0	31	0	4	0
4	DF	NED	Wesley Hoedt	44	3	3	0	1	0	48	3	12	0
5	DF	SCO	Ryan Porteous	33+4	3	1+1	0	1	0	40	3	14	0
6	DF	NIR	Jamal Lewis	32+4	0	1+1	0	0	0	38	0	4	0
7	FW	ENG	Tom Ince	8+19	2	0+2	0	0	0	29	2	1	0
8	MF	ENG	Jake Livermore	25+5	3	1	0	0+1	0	32	3	9	0
9	FW	DEN	Mileta Rajović	17+24	10	1+1	1	0	0	43	11	1	0
11	MF	CAN	Ismaël Koné	28+14	4	3	0	0+1	0	46	4	3	0
12	FW	SWE	Ken Sema	24+5	1	1+1	0	1	0	32	1	1	0
15	DF	ENG	Mattie Pollock	10+8	0	1	0	0	0	19	0	3	0
16	MF	GEO	Giorgi Chakvetadze	14+20	1	3	0	0	0	37	1	7	0
18	MF	COL	Yáser Asprilla	28+16	6	2+1	0	0	0	47	6	6	0
19	FW	CIV	Vakoun Bayo	27+12	6	1+1	0	1	1	42	7	2	1
24	MF	NGA	Tom Dele-Bashiru	28+7	2	2	1	1	0	38	3	2	0
25	FW	NGA	Emmanuel Dennis	11+6	4	0+1	0	0	0	18	4	1	0
26	GK	ENG	Ben Hamer	19	0	0+1	0	1	0	21	0	3	0
37	FW	BRA	Matheus Martins	20+19	5	3	1	1	0	43	6	3	0
39	MF	COD	Edo Kayembe	28+7	5	0	0	0+1	0	36	5	6	0
42	DF	ENG	James Morris	10+2	0	2+1	0	1	0	16	0	2	0
45	DF	ENG	Ryan Andrews	26+14	3	1+2	0	0+1	0	44	3	7	1
55	DF	ENG	Albert Eames	0+1	0	0	0	0	0	1	0	0	0
58	FW	ENG	Zavier Massiah-Edwards	0+1	0	0	0	0	0	1	0	0	0
59	FW	ENG	Jack Grieves	1+1	0	0	0	0	0	2	0	0	0
Players who went out on loan or left permanently but made appearances for Watford prior to departing
10	MF	MAR	Imran Louza	11+4	1	0+1	0	1	0	17	1	4	0
14	FW	ENG	Rhys Healey	1+10	2	1	0	0+1	0	13	2	1	0
17	FW	COL	Jorge Hurtado	0	0	0+1	0	0	0	1	0	0	0

=== Goalscorers ===
As of 4 May 2024

Rank	Pos.	No.	Player	Championship	FA Cup	EFL Cup	Total
1	FW	9	(Denmark) Mileta Rajović	10	1	0	11
2	FW	19	(Ivory Coast) Vakoun Bayo	6	0	1	7
3	MF	18	(Colombia) Yáser Asprilla	6	0	0	6
3	FW	37	(Brazil) Matheus Martins	5	1	0	6
5	MF	39	(Democratic Republic of the Congo) Edo Kayembe	5	0	0	5
6	MF	11	(Canada) Ismaël Koné	4	0	0	4
6	FW	25	(Nigeria) Emmanuel Dennis	4	0	0	4
8	DF	4	(Netherlands) Wesley Hoedt	3	0	0	3
8	DF	5	(Scotland) Ryan Porteous	3	0	0	3
8	MF	8	(England) Jake Livermore	3	0	0	3
8	MF	24	(Nigeria) Tom Dele-Bashiru	2	1	0	3
8	DF	45	(England) Ryan Andrews	3	0	0	3
13	FW	7	(England) Tom Ince	2	0	0	2
13	FW	14	(England) Rhys Healey	2	0	0	2
15	MF	10	(Morocco) Imran Louza	1	0	0	1
15	FW	12	(Sweden) Ken Sema	1	0	0	1
15	MF	16	(Georgia (country)) Giorgi Chakvetadze	1	0	0	1
Total				61	3	1	65

=== Assists ===
As of 4 May 2024

Rank	Pos.	No.	Player	Championship	FA Cup	EFL Cup	Total
1	MF	18	(Colombia) Yáser Asprilla	7	1	0	8
2	FW	12	(Sweden) Ken Sema	4	0	0	4
3	DF	4	(Netherlands) Wesley Hoedt	3	0	0	3
3	DF	5	(Scotland) Ryan Porteous	3	0	0	3
3	MF	10	(Morocco) Imran Louza	3	0	0	3
3	MF	11	(Canada) Ismaël Koné	3	0	0	3
3	MF	16	(Georgia (country)) Giorgi Chakvetadze	3	0	0	3
3	FW	19	(Ivory Coast) Vakoun Bayo	3	0	0	3
3	MF	24	(Nigeria) Tom Dele-Bashiru	2	0	1	3
10	DF	6	(Northern Ireland) Jamal Lewis	2	0	0	2
10	FW	7	(England) Tom Ince	2	0	0	2
10	FW	37	(Brazil) Matheus Martins	2	0	0	2
10	MF	39	(Democratic Republic of the Congo) Edo Kayembe	2	0	0	2
10	DF	45	(England) Ryan Andrews	2	0	0	2
15	DF	2	(England) Jeremy Ngakia	1	0	0	1
15	DF	3	(Chile) Francisco Sierralta	1	0	0	1
15	MF	8	(England) Jake Livermore	1	0	0	1
15	FW	14	(England) Rhys Healey	1	0	0	1
15	FW	17	(Colombia) Jorge Hurtado	0	1	0	1

=== Clean sheets ===
As of 27 April 2024

No.	Player	Championship	FA Cup	EFL Cup	Total
1	(Austria) Daniel Bachmann	11	0	0	11
26	(England) Ben Hamer	3	0	0	3
Total		14	0	0	14
