= Andrés Aguilar =

Andrés Aguilar may refer to:

- Andrés Aguilar (archer)
- Andrés Aguilar (footballer)
- Andrés Aguilar Mawdsley, Venezuelan lawyer and diplomat
- Andrés Aguilar (character), DC Comics character also known as Cadejos
