= Jake Livermore =

English footballer (born 1989)

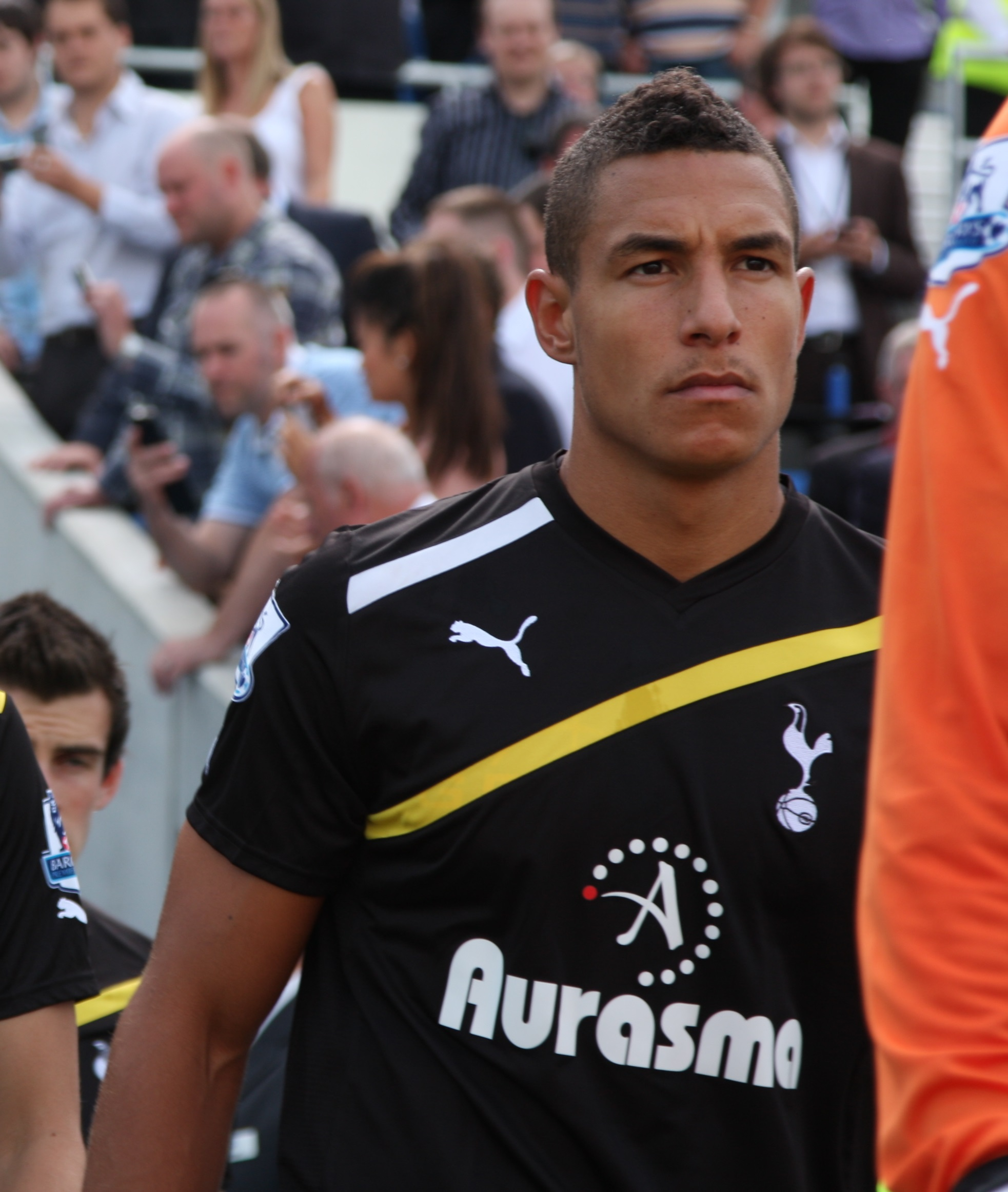
- Livermore with Tottenham Hotspur in 2011

Personal information
- Full name: Jake Cyril Leonard Livermore
- Date of birth: 14 November 1989 (age 36)
- Place of birth: Enfield, England
- Height: 5 ft 11 in (1.81 m)
- Position: Defensive midfielder

Youth career
- 2006–2008: Tottenham Hotspur

Senior career*
Years	Team	Apps	(Gls)
2008–2014	Tottenham Hotspur	36	(0)
2008	→ Milton Keynes Dons (loan)	5	(0)
2008	→ Crewe Alexandra (loan)	0	(0)
2009	→ Derby County (loan)	16	(1)
2010	→ Peterborough United (loan)	9	(1)
2010–2011	→ Ipswich Town (loan)	12	(0)
2011	→ Leeds United (loan)	5	(0)
2013–2014	→ Hull City (loan)	36	(3)
2014–2017	Hull City	90	(6)
2017–2023	West Bromwich Albion	206	(8)
2023–2024	Watford	30	(3)
Total		445	(22)

International career
2012–2017	England	7	(0)
- * Club domestic league appearances and goals

Jake Cyril Leonard Livermore (born 14 November 1989) is an English former professional footballer who played as a defensive midfielder.

Livermore began his career at Tottenham Hotspur, spending most of his tenure out on loan at clubs in all three divisions of the English Football League. In 2013, he moved to Hull City, initially on a temporary basis, becoming permanent at the end of the season. After making 144 appearances for the club in all competitions, he joined West Bromwich Albion in January 2017. He later joined Watford in July 2023, and left the club at the end of the same season.

Livermore earned his first cap for the England national team in August 2012 in a friendly win against Italy.

== Early life ==
Jake Cyril Leonard Livermore was born on 14 November 1989 in Enfield, Greater London, and attended Enfield Grammar School.

== Club career ==
=== Tottenham Hotspur ===
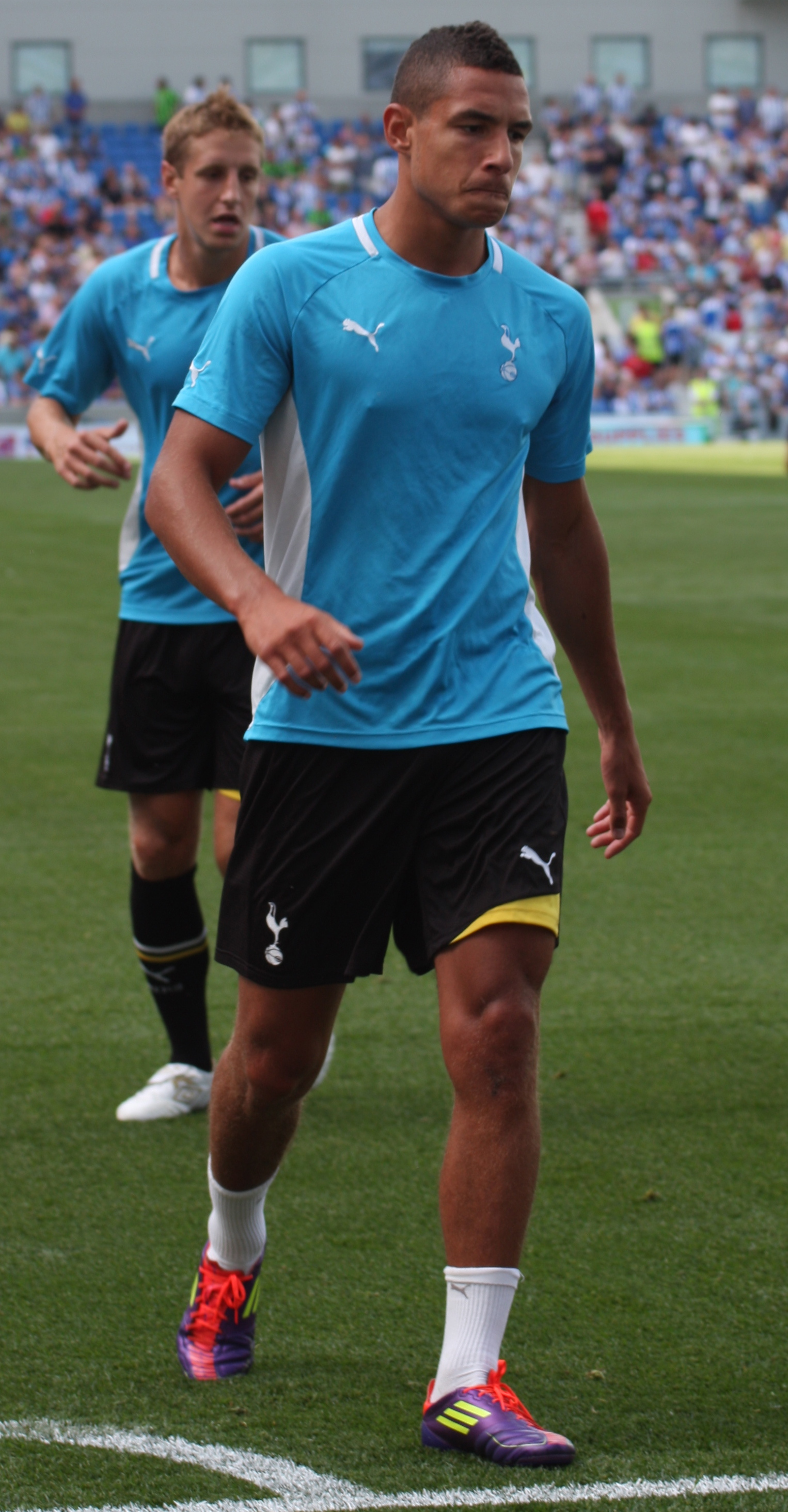
Livermore training with Tottenham Hotspur in 2011

Livermore's career started in Arsenal F.C's Academy after leaving and joining Tottenham Hotspur's academy in 2006, making 39 appearances for the under-18 team and scoring nine goals. He made another 13 appearances for the reserves. On 29 February 2008, he joined Milton Keynes Dons on a month-long loan deal. He made his professional debut the following day in a 1–0 win over Chester City at Stadium MK, playing the last 14 minutes in place of Jordan Hadfield. Livermore played five matches for the League Two club, all as a substitute.

On 11 July 2008, he was loaned for six months to League One club Crewe Alexandra. However, in a friendly with Conference Premier team Wrexham, he fractured his fibula and subsequently returned to Tottenham to receive treatment which kept him sidelined for a protracted spell. Livermore signed a new two-year deal with Tottenham on 24 July 2009.

He joined Championship club Derby County on an initial one-month loan on 10 August 2009. He scored his first league goal against Nottingham Forest in a 3–2 away defeat on 29 August. In January 2010, he joined another club in the division, Peterborough United, until the end of the 2009–10 season. He scored his first goal for Peterborough in a 2–1 defeat at Sheffield Wednesday on 23 January. On 2 March, he was recalled from his loan due to a spate of injuries to the Tottenham squad. Livermore made his competitive debut for Tottenham in a 2–1 win against Stoke City at the Britannia Stadium on 20 March, coming on in added time for Niko Kranjčar.

On 23 September 2010, he was loaned out to Championship club Ipswich Town until January. On 24 March 2011, he was loaned out to Leeds United of the same division ahead of their final eight league matches and battle for promotion to the Premier League. On 2 April, Livermore made his debut for Leeds as a second-half substitute against Nottingham Forest where he had a hand in Leeds' fourth goal scored by Max Gradel. He was given a start against Reading, however he was substituted at half time after picking up a yellow card and lucky not to receive another for a tackle in the first half.

Livermore stayed with Tottenham for the 2011–12 season, scoring his first senior goal for Spurs on 18 August 2011 in the 5–0 UEFA Europa League qualifying win away against Heart of Midlothian, and ultimately made 38 appearances across all competitions.

=== Hull City ===
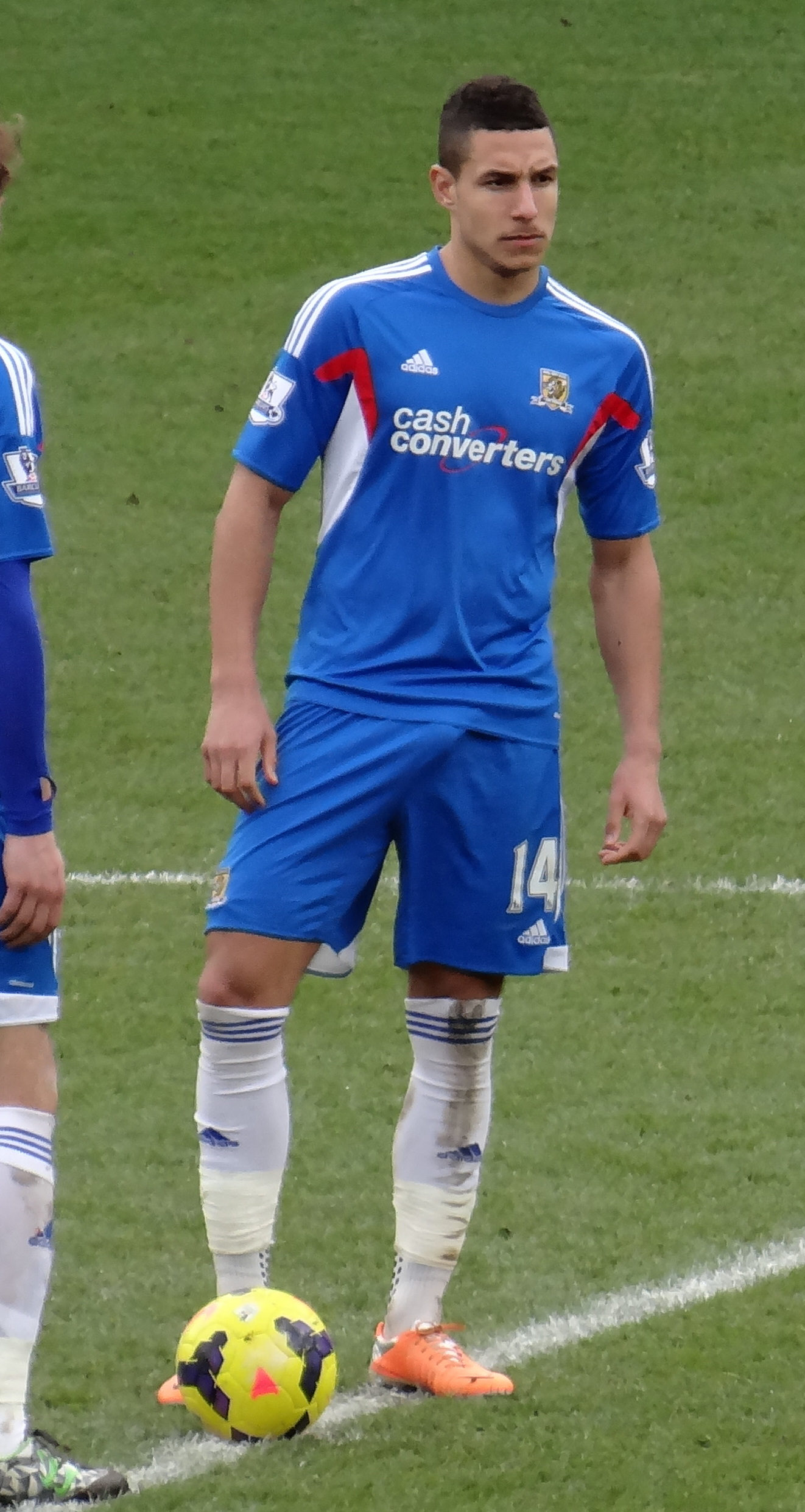
Livermore playing for Hull City in 2014

Livermore moved to Hull City at the beginning of 2013–14 on a season-long loan, along with teammate Tom Huddlestone. He made his debut on the first day of the season when he came off the bench for Danny Graham in the 59th minute of a 2–0 loss away at Chelsea. On 1 December, he scored his first Premier League and Hull goal, opening a 3–1 home win over Liverpool with a shot deflecting off Martin Škrtel, Hull's first ever victory over the Merseyside opponents.

Hull reached the 2014 FA Cup final, and Livermore started the match against Arsenal, which resulted in a 3–2 defeat at Wembley Stadium after extra time. In the close season, he joined Hull permanently for an undisclosed fee, one which was reported to have broken the club transfer record.

Following a 2–0 win against Crystal Palace in April 2015, Livermore was selected for a random drugs test. He tested positive for cocaine and, on 15 May 2015, was suspended by both the FA and Hull City for the remainder of the season. In August, Hull manager Steve Bruce revealed that Livermore had taken the substance to cope with the grief caused by the death of his newborn child shortly after the FA Cup final. In September 2015, a disciplinary hearing decided that the Football Association provisional ban would not be extended, as a result, his suspension by Hull City was also lifted.

At the start of the 2016–17 season, newly promoted Hull had only one fully fit recognised centre-back in Curtis Davies, so Livermore was selected to play as a centre-back alongside Davies.

=== West Bromwich Albion ===
Livermore joined Hull's fellow Premier League club West Bromwich Albion on a four-and-a-half-year deal on 20 January 2017 for a fee reported to be £10 million. He made his debut the following day in a 2–0 win against Sunderland at The Hawthorns, coming off the bench in place of James Morrison for the last 20 minutes of the match.

On 2 January 2018, Livermore had an altercation with a West Ham United fan at the London Stadium; he reported that the fan had taunted him about his son who died in infancy in 2014. The FA did not punish Livermore for the incident but warned him that such reactions could endanger himself and other fans. The West Ham fan was given an indefinite ban from the stadium.

In his 50th game for the Baggies on 21 April 2018, Livermore scored his first goal for the club as they came from behind to draw 2–2 with Liverpool. Two weeks later, he scored the only goal of a home win over his former team Tottenham, saving his team from immediate relegation.

On 23 May 2023 West Bromwich Albion announced that Jake Livermore would be leaving the club and was named on the club's release list. As part of the announcement, the club paid tribute to the many years of service Jake had given to the club.

=== Watford ===
On 21 July 2023, Livermore signed a one-year contract with Championship club Watford, where he had been training since leaving West Brom. On 23 May 2024, the club announced he would be leaving in the summer when his contract expired.

== International career ==
Livermore made his first senior appearance for England in a 2–1 friendly win against Italy on 15 August 2012 at the Stade de Suisse in Bern, coming on as a substitute in the 69th minute for Frank Lampard.

After nearly five years away from international football, Livermore was recalled to the England squad in March 2017 by manager Gareth Southgate for a friendly match against Germany and a 2018 World Cup qualifier against Lithuania. He subsequently made his first start for England in a 1–0 away defeat to Germany on 22 March. Livermore was again called up by Southgate in May 2017 for a World Cup qualifier against Scotland, and a friendly against France.

On 16 May 2018, he was one of five players named on standby for the 23-man England national team squad for the 2018 FIFA World Cup.

== Career statistics ==
=== Club ===
As of match played 27 April 2024

Appearances and goals by club, season and competition
Club	Season	League			FA Cup		League Cup		Other		Total	
Club	Season	Division	Apps	Goals	Apps	Goals	Apps	Goals	Apps	Goals	Apps	Goals
Tottenham Hotspur	2007–08	Premier League	0	0	0	0	0	0	0	0	0	0
Tottenham Hotspur	2008–09	Premier League	0	0	0	0	0	0	0	0	0	0
Tottenham Hotspur	2009–10	Premier League	1	0	0	0	—		—		1	0
Tottenham Hotspur	2010–11	Premier League	0	0	0	0	1	0	0	0	1	0
Tottenham Hotspur	2011–12	Premier League	24	0	5	0	1	0	8 (Note: Appearances in UEFA Europa League)	1	38	1
Tottenham Hotspur	2012–13	Premier League	11	0	0	0	1	0	6	0	18	0
Tottenham Hotspur	Total		36	0	5	0	3	0	14	1	58	1
Milton Keynes Dons (loan)	2007–08	League Two	5	0	—		—		—		5	0
Derby County (loan)	2009–10	Championship	16	1	—		—		—		16	1
Peterborough United (loan)	2009–10	Championship	9	1	—		—		—		9	1
Ipswich Town (loan)	2010–11	Championship	12	0	—		—		—		12	0
Leeds United (loan)	2010–11	Championship	5	0	—		—		—		5	0
Hull City (loan)	2013–14	Premier League	36	3	5	0	0	0	—		41	3
Hull City	2014–15	Premier League	35	1	0	0	1	0	3	0	39	1
Hull City	2015–16	Championship	34	4	0	0	2	0	3 (Note: Appearances in Championship play-offs)	0	39	4
Hull City	2016–17	Premier League	21	1	1	0	3	0	—		25	1
Hull City	Total		126	9	6	0	6	0	6	0	144	9
West Bromwich Albion	2016–17	Premier League	16	0	—		—		—		16	0
West Bromwich Albion	2017–18	Premier League	34	2	2	0	1	0	—		37	2
West Bromwich Albion	2018–19	Championship	39	2	1	0	0	0	0	0	40	2
West Bromwich Albion	2019–20	Championship	45	3	0	0	0	0	—		45	3
West Bromwich Albion	2020–21	Premier League	18	0	1	0	0	0	—		19	0
West Bromwich Albion	2021–22	Championship	37	0	1	0	0	0	—		38	0
West Bromwich Albion	2022–23	Championship	17	1	3	1	1	0	—		21	2
West Bromwich Albion	Total		206	8	8	1	2	0	0	0	216	9
Watford	2023–24	Championship	30	3	1	0	1	0	—		32	3
Career total			446	22	20	1	12	0	20	1	497	24

=== International ===
Appearances and goals by national team and year
National team	Year	Apps	Goals
England	2012	1	0
England	2017	6	0
Total		7	0

== Honours ==
Hull City

- Football League Championship play-offs: 2016
- FA Cup runner-up: 2013–14

West Bromwich Albion

- EFL Championship second-place promotion: 2019–20
