= Albert Eames =

English footballer (born 2005)

Personal information
- Full name: Albert George Eames
- Date of birth: 20 December 2005 (age 20)
- Place of birth: Hammersmith, England
- Position: Right-back

Team information
- Current team: Watford
- Number: 56

Youth career
- Berkhamsted Raiders
- 2014–: Watford

Senior career*
Years	Team	Apps	(Gls)
2024–	Watford	1	(0)
2024	→ Chelmsford City (loan)	4	(0)
- * Club domestic league appearances and goals as of 18:00, 27 November 2024 (UTC)

Albert George Eames (born 20 December 2005) is an English professional footballer who plays as a right-back for EFL Championship club Watford.

== Career ==
Eames joined the Academy of Watford at under-8s level. Despite being released in 2020 at under-14s, he was invited back to the club on a trial, re-signing terms with the club. In July 2022, he was signed a scholarship deal.

In March 2024, following the appointment of under-18s manager Tom Cleverley as first-team head coach, Eames was promoted to training with the first-team squad. In April 2024, he signed a three-year professional contract, whilst also impressing for the under-21s squad. On 4 May 2024, the final day of the 2023–24 season, he made his first-team debut as a last-minute substitute in a 3–1 defeat to Middlesbrough.

On 25 October 2024, Eames signed for National League South side Chelmsford City on loan.

== Career statistics ==
As of match played 9 November 2024

Appearances and goals by club, season and competition
Club	Season	League			FA Cup		League Cup		Other		Total	
Club	Season	Division	Apps	Goals	Apps	Goals	Apps	Goals	Apps	Goals	Apps	Goals
Watford	2023–24	Championship	1	0	0	0	0	0	—		1	0
Watford	2024–25	Championship	0	0	0	0	0	0	—		0	0
Watford	2025–26	Championship	0	0	0	0	0	0	—		0	0
Watford	2026–27	Championship	0	0	0	0	0	0	—		0	0
Watford	Total		1	0	0	0	0	0	0	0	1	0
Chelmsford City (loan)	2024–25	National League South	4	0	—		—		0	0	4	0
Career total			5	0	0	0	0	0	0	0	5	0
