= Daniel Bachmann =

Austrian footballer (born 1994)

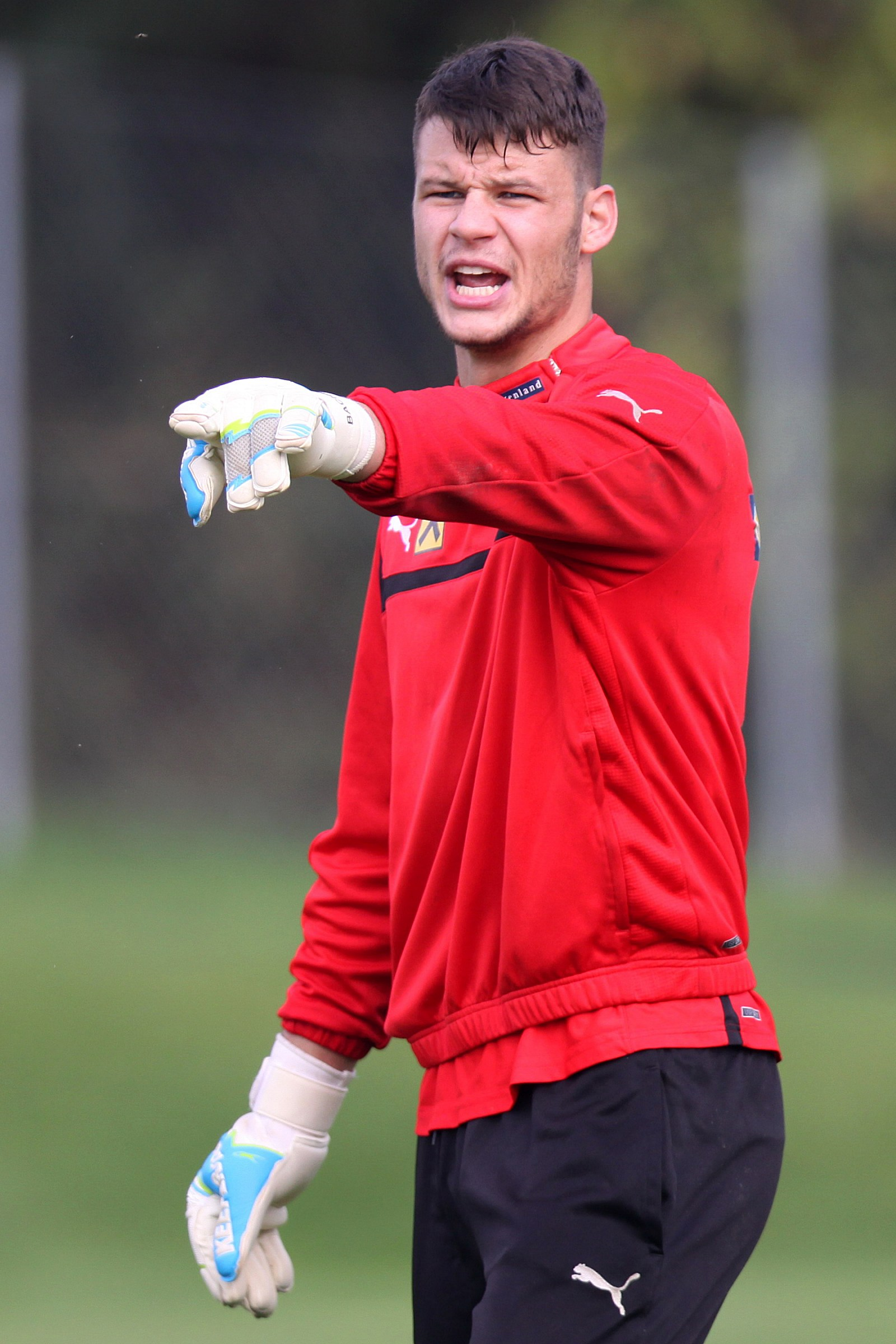
- Bachmann training with Austria U21 in 2015

Personal information
- Full name: Daniel Bachmann
- Date of birth: 9 July 1994 (age 32)
- Place of birth: Wiener Neustadt, Austria
- Height: 1.91 m (6 ft 3 in)
- Position: Goalkeeper

Team information
- Current team: Watford
- Number: 26

Youth career
- 2000–2003: SV Winzendorf
- 2003–2004: SV Weikersdorf
- 2004–2006: Admira Wacker
- 2006–2007: Rapid Wien
- 2007–2009: Admira Wacker
- 2009–2010: Sturm Graz
- 2010–2011: Austria Wien
- 2011–2012: Stoke City

Senior career*
Years	Team	Apps	(Gls)
2012–2017	Stoke City	0	(0)
2014–2015	→ Wrexham (loan)	15	(0)
2015	→ Ross County (loan)	1	(0)
2015–2016	→ Bury (loan)	8	(0)
2017–	Watford	129	(0)
2018–2019	→ Kilmarnock (loan)	25	(0)
2025–2026	→ Deportivo La Coruña (loan)	0	(0)
2026	→ Leyton Orient (loan)	0	(0)

International career^{‡}
2009–2010	Austria U16	3	(0)
2010	Austria U17	1	(0)
2011	Austria U18	1	(0)
2012–2013	Austria U19	5	(0)
2015–2016	Austria U21	16	(0)
2021–2023	Austria	14	(0)
- * Club domestic league appearances and goals as of 30 January 2026 (UTC) ‡ National team caps and goals as of 30 January 2026

Daniel Bachmann (born 9 July 1994) is an Austrian professional footballer who plays as a goalkeeper for EFL Championship club Watford.

Bachmann began his professional career with Stoke City in 2011. During his time at Stoke, he gained first-team experience by going out on loan to Wrexham, Ross County and Bury. Bachmann moved to Watford in 2017 and spent the following season on loan at Kilmarnock. He then moved to Spanish second division side Deportivo La Coruña in 2025 on loan.

Bachmann represented Austria from under-16 to under-21 level, earning his first call-up in 2017, before making his senior international debut in June 2021. He started all of Austria's games at UEFA Euro 2020 in goal.

== Club career ==
=== Stoke City ===
Bachmann joined English side Stoke City from FK Austria Wien in the summer of 2011. He played with Stoke's under-18 and under-21 squads and joined Conference Premier side Wrexham on loan on 5 August 2014. He played 18 times for the Dragons as they finished in 11th position.

Bachmann joined Scottish Premiership side Ross County on a six-month loan in July 2015. Bachmann made his professional debut on 8 August 2015, coming on for injured goalie Scott Fox in a 2–0 victory over Hamilton Academical. On 31 August 2015, the loan deal was terminated by mutual consent after making just two appearances for the Dingwall side. On 28 October 2015, Bachmann joined League One side Bury on a one-month loan. His loan at Gigg Lane was extended until the beginning of January 2016 when he returned to Stoke after making ten appearances for the Shakers.

Bachmann signed a one-year contract extension with Stoke in July 2016. He was released by Stoke at the end of the 2016–17 season.

=== Watford ===
On 1 July 2017, Bachmann signed a three-year deal with Watford.

On 8 August 2018, Bachmann joined Scottish Premiership side Kilmarnock on a season-long loan deal. He made his Watford debut the following season, playing in a 3–3 draw against Tranmere Rovers in the FA Cup third round.

On 14 August 2021, Bachmann played his first game in the Premier League in Watford's league opener against Aston Villa, where Watford won 3–2.

On 12 August 2025, Bachmann joined Segunda División club Deportivo La Coruña on a season-long loan. He was recalled in January 2026, joining League One club Leyton Orient on loan for the remainder of the season. Bachmann had his loan cut short in February 2026 when he fractured his ankle in the warm up before his debut for Orient.

== International career ==
Bachmann played youth international football for Austria at under-16, under-17, under-18, under-19 and under-21 levels.

On 14 March 2017, he was called up to the senior national team for the first time for games against Moldova and Finland. In March 2021, Bachmann received his second international call-up for the Austria national team ahead of the 2022 World Cup qualifiers in March against Scotland, Faroe Islands and Denmark. He made his debut on 2 June 2021, in a friendly against England. Bachmann started all four games in Austria's UEFA Euro 2020 campaign which ended in the round of 16.

== Career statistics ==
=== Club ===
As of match played 4 January 2025

Appearances and goals by club, season and competition
Club	Season	League			National cup (Note: Includes FA Cup, Scottish Cup)		League cup (Note: Includes EFL Cup, Scottish League Cup)		Other		Total	
Club	Season	Division	Apps	Goals	Apps	Goals	Apps	Goals	Apps	Goals	Apps	Goals
Stoke City	2014–15	Premier League	0	0	0	0	0	0	—		0	0
Stoke City	2015–16	Premier League	0	0	0	0	0	0	—		0	0
Stoke City	Total		0	0	0	0	0	0	0	0	0	0
Wrexham (loan)	2014–15	Conference Premier	15	0	0	0	—		3 (Note: Appearances in FA Trophy)	0	18	0
Ross County (loan)	2015–16	Scottish Premiership	1	0	0	0	1	0	—		2	0
Bury (loan)	2015–16	League One	8	0	2	0	0	0	—		10	0
Watford	2017–18	Premier League	0	0	0	0	0	0	—		0	0
Watford	2018–19	Premier League	0	0	0	0	0	0	—		0	0
Watford	2019–20	Premier League	0	0	2	0	0	0	—		2	0
Watford	2020–21	Championship	23	0	1	0	2	0	—		26	0
Watford	2021–22	Premier League	12	0	1	0	0	0	—		13	0
Watford	2022–23	Championship	45	0	0	0	0	0	—		45	0
Watford	2023–24	Championship	27	0	3	0	0	0	—		30	0
Watford	2024–25	Championship	22	0	0	0	0	0	—		0	
Watford	Total		129	0	9	0	2	0	0	0	138	0
Kilmarnock (loan)	2018–19	Scottish Premiership	25	0	2	0	1	0	—		28	0
Deportivo La Coruña (loan)	2025–26	Segunda División	0	0	0	0	—		0	0	0	0
Career total			178	0	11	0	5	0	3	0	196	0

=== International ===
As of match played 7 September 2023

Appearances and goals by national team and year
National team	Year	Apps	Goals
Austria	2021	12	0
Austria	2022	1	0
Austria	2023	1	0
Total		14	0
