= Zavier Massiah-Edwards =

English footballer (born 2007)

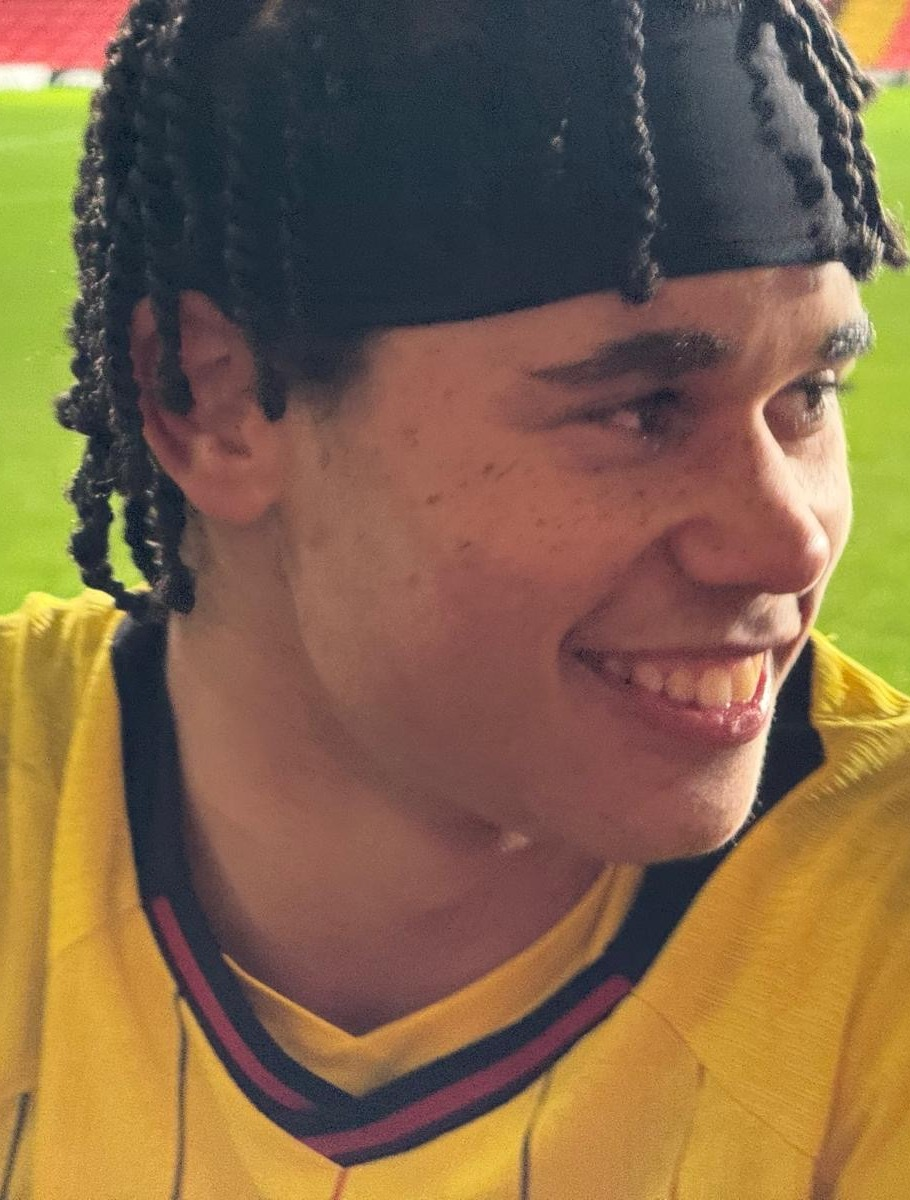

Personal information
- Full name: Zavier Tyrone Massiah-Edwards
- Date of birth: 16 January 2007 (age 19)
- Place of birth: Whitechapel, London, England
- Position: Winger

Team information
- Current team: Southend United
- Number: 17

Youth career
- 2013–2016: Brentford
- 2016–2026: Watford

Senior career*
Years	Team	Apps	(Gls)
2024–2026	Watford	5	(0)
2025	→ Eastleigh (loan)	6	(1)
2026	→ Braintree Town (loan)	13	(0)
2026–	Southend United	10	(0)
- * Club domestic league appearances and goals as of 29 September 2026 (UTC)

Zavier Tyrone Massiah-Edwards (born 16 January 2007) is an English professional football player who plays as a winger for National League club Southend United on a non-contract basis.

== Career ==
=== Watford ===
Massiah-Edwards grew up in Shepherds Bush, West London. He attended Brackenbury Primary School and Hammersmith Academy Secondary School. He was a youth product of Brentford from the age of 5 but following the decision to close their academy at the end of his then U9 Season he moved to Watford's academy in 2016 to finish his development. He was promoted to the U18 and U21s in 2023 during the first year of his Scholarship and fast-tracked to the senior team after strong performances. He made his senior and professional debut for Watford less than 4 months after turning 17 as a late substitute in a 3–1 EFL Championship loss to Middlesbrough on 4 May 2024.

On 18 July 2024, he signed his first professional contract with Watford.

During the second year of his scholarship, still as an U18, Massiah-Edwards played a further 26 U21 games taking his total as a Scholar to 47 played during both seasons, starting 31 of those.

On 25 February 2025 he scored the winner in the FA Youth Cup Quarter Final victory over Southampton. Playing for the first-team against Hull City as a 61st minute substitute two days before the semi-final he sustained an elbow to the head and was ruled out under concussion protocols missing the match against Manchester City. He finished the 2024–25 campaign with 4 first-team appearances in the EFL Championship against Plymouth, Hull City, Blackburn Rovers and Sheffield Wednesday.

On 20 August 2025, Massiah-Edwards joined National League club Eastleigh on a one-month loan deal. Following his first senior goal, away to Halifax, the loan was extended by an additional month. However, it was cut short after Eastleigh took the decision to replace their manager, and it became clear that his playing time would be limited. He finished his time at Eastleigh with 6 appearances, starting 4.

On 24 January 2026, Massiah-Edwards joined National League side, Braintree Town for the remainder of the 2025–26 campaign.

=== Southend United ===
On 3 September 2026, Massiah-Edwards joined National League club Southend United on non-contract terms.

== Career statistics ==
As of match played 11 April 2026

Appearances and goals by club, season and competition
Club	Season	League			FA Cup		EFL Cup		Other		Total	
Club	Season	Division	Apps	Goals	Apps	Goals	Apps	Goals	Apps	Goals	Apps	Goals
Watford	2023–24	Championship	1	0	0	0	0	0	—		1	0
Watford	2024–25	Championship	4	0	0	0	0	0	—		4	0
Watford	2025–26	Championship	0	0	0	0	0	0	—		0	0
Watford	Total		5	0	0	0	0	0	0	0	5	0
Eastleigh (loan)	2025–26	National League	6	1	0	0	—		0	0	6	1
Braintree Town (loan)	2025–26	National League	13	0	—		—		0	0	13	0
Career total			24	1	0	0	0	0	0	0	24	1
