= Mileta Rajović =

Danish footballer (born 1999)

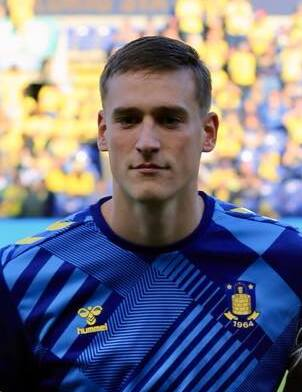
- Rajović with Brøndby in 2024

Personal information
- Date of birth: 17 July 1999 (age 27)
- Place of birth: Ballerup, Denmark
- Height: 1.92 m (6 ft 4 in)
- Position: Forward

Team information
- Current team: Midtjylland (on loan from Legia Warsaw)
- Number: 9

Youth career
- 2010–2014: Brøndby
- 2014–2016: AB
- 2016–2017: Brøndby
- 2017–2018: Randers

Senior career*
Years	Team	Apps	(Gls)
2018–2019	B.93	11	(4)
2019	HB Køge	1	(0)
2019–2021	Roskilde	29	(9)
2021–2022	Næstved	55	(29)
2023	Kalmar FF	20	(7)
2023–2025	Watford	44	(11)
2024–2025	→ Brøndby (loan)	24	(5)
2025–	Legia Warsaw	38	(5)
2026–	→ Midtjylland (loan)	5	(0)
- * Club domestic league appearances and goals as of 21:03, 19 October 2026 (UTC)

Mileta Rajović (born 17 July 1999) is a Danish professional footballer who plays as a forward for Danish Superliga club Midtjylland, on loan from Ekstraklasa club Legia Warsaw.

== Career ==
=== Early career ===
Having previously played for AB, Brøndby and Randers at youth level, Rajović signed for B.93 in September 2018 following a trial spell at the club. He transferred to HB Køge on a contract until the end of the season in January 2019, but he was released when his contract expired at the end of the season, having made a single league appearance for the club. He joined Roskilde in summer 2019 and agreed a one-year contract with the club in September 2019.

=== Næstved and Kalmar FF ===
Rajović signed for Næstved in January 2021. Having scored 12 goals in his opening 17 matches of the 2021–22 season, he signed a contract extension with the club in October 2021. During the 2021–22 season, he scored 18 goals in 27 games as Næstved were promoted from the Danish 2nd Division as champions, and was given the club's Player of the Year award for the season. In December 2022, it was rumoured that there was transfer interest in Rajović from multiple clubs in the Danish Superliga and Allsvenskan, including IFK Göteborg. Having amassed 30 goals in 58 games for Næstved, Rajović signed for Allsvenskan club Kalmar FF on a three-and-a-half-year deal on 9 December 2022. The fee received for Rajović was a new club record for Næstved according to their sporting director Peter Dinesen. His first four appearances for Kalmar came in the Svenska Cupen, in which he scored five goals.

=== Watford ===
On 25 August 2023, Rajović signed for EFL Championship club Watford on a five-year contract for an undisclosed fee, reported to be around £1 million. He made his debut as a substitute in a 1–0 Championship defeat to Blackburn Rovers on 27 August, and scored a brace on his first start the following week as Watford drew 3–3 away to Coventry City. On 11 November 2023, Rajović scored the first two goals in a 5–0 thrashing at home to Rotherham, making the club six games undefeated. Despite Rajović starting only 17 of his 43 appearances for the 2023-24 season, he finished as the top goalscorer with 11 goals across all competitions.

==== Loan to Brøndby ====
On 2 September 2024, Rajović returned to former club Brøndby on loan for the rest of the 2024–25 season.

=== Legia Warsaw ===
On 15 July 2025, Rajović signed a four-year deal with Polish Ekstraklasa club Legia Warsaw for a fee of €3 million, making Rajović the most expensive signing in the league's history at the time.

Mileta Rajović has been portrayed in the media as a physically strong but inefficient striker, with journalists noting that although he often finds himself in good scoring positions, he struggles to convert chances and lacks composure in front of goal; in analyses concerning Legia Warsaw, he has been described as a static, traditional No. 9 whose contribution outside the penalty area is limited, and whose goal output falls short of expectations, leading to questions about his suitability as a first-choice striker at a higher competitive level.

In early 2026, Rajović finally broke his goal drought, scoring the winning goal against Cracovia, which ended a run of 14 consecutive league matches without a goal and over 160 days of waiting for a strike in the Ekstraklasa; this goal was widely described as a “breakthrough”, especially given that he had previously gone more than 1000 minutes without scoring from open play, and it marked a moment where both his confidence and media perception began to improve at Legia Warsaw.

==== Loan to Midtjylland ====
On 2 September 2026, transfer deadline day, Rajović returned to Denmark, where he signed a one-season loan deal with Midtjylland.. He scored his first goal for the club in a 7–0 win against Sundby in the Danish Cup.

== Personal life ==
Born in Denmark, Rajović is of Montenegrin descent. Besides Denmark, he is eligible to represent Montenegro national football team.

== Career statistics ==
As of match played 19 October 2026

Appearances and goals by club, season and competition
Club	Season	League			National cup (Note: Includes Svenska Cupen, FA Cup, Polish Cup)		League cup (Note: Includes EFL Cup)		Other		Total	
Club	Season	Division	Apps	Goals	Apps	Goals	Apps	Goals	Apps	Goals	Apps	Goals
Roskilde	2019–20	Danish 1st Division	18	6	0	0	—		—		18	6
Roskilde	2020–21	Danish 2nd Division	11	3	2	2	—		—		13	5
Roskilde	Total		29	9	2	2	0	0	0	0	31	11
Næstved	2020–21	Danish 2nd Division	13	2	0	0	—		—		13	2
Næstved	2021–22	Danish 2nd Division	27	18	1	0	—		—		28	18
Næstved	2022–23	Danish 1st Division	15	9	2	1	—		—		17	10
Næstved	Total		55	29	3	1	0	0	0	0	58	30
Kalmar	2023	Allsvenskan	20	7	4	5	—		2 (Note: Appearances in UEFA Europa Conference League)	1	26	13
Watford	2023–24	Championship	41	10	2	1	0	0	—		43	11
Watford	2024–25	Championship	3	1	0	0	2	2	0	0	5	3
Watford	Total		44	11	2	1	2	2	0	0	48	14
Brøndby (loan)	2024–25	Danish Superliga	24	5	4	3	—		0	0	28	8
Legia Warsaw	2025–26	Ekstraklasa	32	5	1	0	—		10 (Note: Two appearances and one goal in UEFA Europa League, eight appearances and three goals in UEFA Conference League)	4	43	9
Legia Warsaw	2026–27	Ekstraklasa	6	0	1	0	—		—		7	0
Legia Warsaw	Total		38	5	2	0	—		10	4	50	9
Midtjylland (loan)	2026–27	Danish Superliga	5	0	1	1	—		1 (Note: Appearances in UEFA Conference League)	0	7	1
Career total			215	66	18	13	2	2	13	5	248	86
