= Matheus Martins =

Brazilian footballer (born 2003)

Personal information
- Full name: Matheus Martins Silva dos Santos
- Date of birth: 16 July 2003 (age 23)
- Place of birth: Campo Grande, Brazil
- Height: 1.78 m (5 ft 10 in)
- Position: Winger

Team information
- Current team: Botafogo
- Number: 11

Youth career
- 2012–2021: Fluminense

Senior career*
| Years | Team | Apps | (Gls) |
| 2021–2022 | Fluminense | 51 | (6) |
| 2023–2024 | Udinese | 0 | (0) |
| 2023–2024 | → Watford (loan) | 45 | (5) |
| 2024– | Botafogo | 50 | (5) |

International career^{‡}
| 2019 | Brazil U16 | 3 | (0) |
| 2021–2023 | Brazil U20 | 6 | (3) |
- * Club domestic league appearances and goals as of 8 April 2026 ‡ National team caps and goals as of 08:55, 25 October 2022 (UTC)

Matheus Martins Silva dos Santos (born 16 July 2003) is a Brazilian professional footballer who plays as a winger for Botafogo.

== Career ==
On 1 July 2021, Martins signed a professional contract with Fluminense.

On 11 January 2023, Martins joined EFL Championship club Watford on loan from Udinese. He made his league debut on 14 January 2023 as a half time substitute in a 2–0 win against Blackpool and made his first start for the club in a 1–1 draw against Rotherham a week later.

On 4 July 2023, Martins rejoined Watford for a second loan spell.

== Career statistics ==
=== Club ===
As of match played 4 May 2024

Appearances and goals by club, season and competition
| Club | Season | League | | | National Cup | | League Cup | | Continental | | Other | | Total | |
| Club | Season | Division | Apps | Goals | Apps | Goals | Apps | Goals | Apps | Goals | Apps | Goals | Apps | Goals |
|---|---|---|---|---|---|---|---|---|---|---|---|---|---|---|
| Fluminense | 2021 | Série A | 7 | 0 | 2 (Note: Appearances in the Campeonato Carioca) | 0 | 1 | 0 | 0 | 0 | — | | 10 | 0 |
| Fluminense | 2022 | Série A | 30 | 3 | 1 | 0 | 6 | 0 | 1 (Note: Appearance(s) in Copa Sudamericana) | 3 | — | | 38 | 6 |
| Fluminense | Total | | 37 | 3 | 3 | 0 | 7 | 0 | 1 | 3 | — | | 48 | 6 |
| Udinese | 2022–23 | Serie A | 0 | 0 | 0 | 0 | 0 | 0 | 0 | 0 | — | | 0 | 0 |
| Watford (loan) | 2022–23 | Championship | 6 | 0 | 0 | 0 | 0 | 0 | 0 | 0 | — | | 6 | 0 |
| Watford (loan) | 2023–24 | Championship | 39 | 5 | 3 | 1 | 1 | 0 | 0 | 0 | — | | 43 | 6 |
| Career total | | | 82 | 8 | 6 | 1 | 7 | 0 | 1 | 3 | 0 | 0 | 97 | 12 |

== Honours ==
Botafogo

- Copa Libertadores: 2024
- Campeonato Brasileiro Série A: 2024
