= Andrés Aguilar (footballer) =

English footballer (born 2005)

Personal information
- Full name: Andrés Albert Edwin Aguilar
- Date of birth: 30 April 2005 (age 21)
- Place of birth: Stevenage, England
- Height: 1.70 m (5 ft 7 in)
- Position: Midfielder

Team information
- Current team: Operário Ferroviário

Youth career
- 2012–2015: Vera
- 2020–2023: Watford

Senior career*
Years	Team	Apps	(Gls)
2024	New Salamis	0	(0)
2024	Ytterhogdal	3	(2)
2024–2025	Kiruna FF	0	(0)
2025	Ayacucho	0	(0)
2026–	Operário Ferroviário	0	(0)
- * Club domestic league appearances and goals as of 16:53, 17 March 2024 (UTC)

Andrés Albert Edwin Aguilar (born 30 April 2005) is an English footballer who plays as a midfielder for Operário Ferroviário.

== Early life ==
Aguilar was born in Stevenage, England, but his family moved to Spain six weeks after his birth. He played football for local teams in Spain before his family moved to London when he was eleven.

== Club career ==
Having played grassroots football in London, Aguilar was scouted by professional side Watford when he was fifteen, and joined the club in November 2020. Following the expiration of his contract with Watford in June 2023, he stated that he had received offers from clubs across Europe.

In August 2023, it was reported that Peruvian Liga 1 side Sporting Cristal were looking at signing Aguilar. The following month, Peruvian newspaper Depor reported that, despite interest from Swedish side AFC Eskilstuna, Aguilar was set to join Sporting Cristal. Despite this, he remained in England, joining Isthmian League side New Salamis and playing three games for the side in January 2024.

He went on move to Sweden, joining Division 2 Norrland side Ytterhogdal.

== International career ==
Though born in England, Aguilar's grandfather is Peruvian, and he received a Peruvian passport having been contacted by the Peruvian Football Federation. He remains eligible to represent England through birth, Spain, having been raised there, and Cyprus.

== Career statistics ==
=== Club ===
As of 13 March 2024

Appearances and goals by club, season and competition
Club	Season	League			Cup		Other		Total	
Club	Season	Division	Apps	Goals	Apps	Goals	Apps	Goals	Apps	Goals
New Salamis	2023–24	Isthmian League	3	0	0	0	0	0	3	0
Ytterhogdal	2024	Division 2 Norrland	0	0	0	0	0	0	0	0
Career total			3	0	0	0	0	0	3	0
