= Garside =

Garside is a Northern English surname, and may refer to:

- Benjamin Charles Garside (1863–?), American machinist
- Bernhard Garside (born 1962), British diplomat
- Bettis Garside (1894–1989), author
- Charles Garside (1898–1964), lawyer
- Charles Brierley Garside (1818–1876), English Roman Catholic priest
- Frederick Charles Garside (1887–1970), Australian railways executive
- Jake Garside (born 2002), English rugby union player
- James Garside (born 1885, date of death unknown), English footballer
- Jeannine Garside (born 1978), Canadian boxer
- John Garside, British chemical engineer
- KatieJane Garside (born 1968), English singer and writer
- Kenneth Garside (1913–1983), British librarian and intelligence officer
- Mark Garside (born 1989), Scottish ice hockey player
- Melanie Garside-Wight (born 1979), English footballer
- Robert Garside (born 1967), British runner
- Thomas Hamilton Garside (1855–1927), Scottish trade unionist
- William Garside (1872–1951), Scottish footballer

== See also ==
- Garside classification
- Garside element
- Gartside, surname
