= 2018–19 Watford F.C. season =

English football team season

Watford
2018–19 season
- Owner: Gino Pozzo
- Chairman: Scott Duxbury
- Manager: Javi Gracia
- Stadium: Vicarage Road
- Premier League: 11th
- FA Cup: Runners-up (lost final to Manchester City)
- EFL Cup: Third round (eliminated by Tottenham Hotspur)
- Top goalscorer: League: Gerard Deulofeu (10); All: Troy Deeney & Gerard Deulofeu (11)
- Highest home attendance: League/All: 20,540 v Liverpool (24 November 2018, PL round 13)
- Lowest home attendance: League: 17,301 v Fulham (2 April 2019, PL round 32); All: 18,104 v Crystal Palace (16 March 2019, FA Cup QF)
- Average home league attendance: 20,016
- Biggest win: 5–1 v Cardiff City (22 February 2019, PL round 27)
- Biggest defeat: 0–6 v Manchester City (18 May 2019, FA Cup Final)
Home colours	Away colours

The 2018–19 season was Watford's 120th year in their history and fourth consecutive season in the Premier League; their 11th-placed finish in the league was their highest to date in the Premier League era. They also participated in the EFL Cup and FA Cup, reaching the final of the latter before losing to Man City.

The season covers the period from 1 July 2018 to 30 June 2019.

== Transfers ==
=== Transfers in ===
Date from	Position	Nationality	Name	From	Fee	Ref.
1 July 2018	RW	(Spain)	Gerard Deulofeu	(Spain) Barcelona	£11,500,000	
1 July 2018	RB	(Spain)	Marc Navarro	(Spain) Espanyol	Undisclosed	
1 July 2018	CB	(England)	Ben Wilmot	Stevenage	Undisclosed	
2 July 2018	LB	(Italy)	Adam Masina	(Italy) Bologna	Undisclosed	
5 July 2018	GK	(England)	Ben Foster	West Bromwich Albion	Undisclosed	
5 July 2018	LW	(Sweden)	Ken Sema	(Sweden) Östersunds FK	£1,800,000	
9 August 2018	CM	(Portugal)	Domingos Quina	West Ham United	£1,000,000	
10 August 2018	CM	(Ghana)	Kwasi Sibo	(Armenia) Banants	Undisclosed	
8 January 2019	CF	(Serbia)	Filip Stuparević	(Serbia) Voždovac	£2,000,000	
23 January 2019	GK	(England)	Adam Parkes	Southampton	Undisclosed	

=== Loans in ===
Start date	Position	Nationality	Name	From	End date	Ref.

=== Transfers out ===
Date from	Position	Nationality	Name	To	Fee	Ref.
1 July 2018	GK	(Northern Ireland)	Nathan Gartside	(Northern Ireland) Derry City	Released	
1 July 2018	LW	(England)	Dennon Lewis	Unattached	Released	
1 July 2018	LB	(England)	Brandon Mason	(England) Coventry City	Released	
1 July 2018	RB	(England)	Louis Rogers	Unattached	Released	
1 July 2018	CB	(England)	Charlie Rowan	(England) Queens Park Rangers	Released	
1 July 2018	LW	(England)	Max Ryan	Unattached	Released	
1 July 2018	RB	(England)	David Sesay	(England) Crawley Town	Released	
1 July 2018	CB	(England)	Connor Stevens	(England) Wealdstone	Released	
1 July 2018	AM	(England)	Carl Stewart	(England) Wingate & Finchley	Released	
3 July 2018	GK	(Romania)	Costel Pantilimon	(England) Nottingham Forest	Undisclosed	
6 July 2018	ST	(Argentina)	Mauro Zárate	(Argentina) Boca Juniors	Undisclosed	
16 July 2018	LW	(Morocco)	Nordin Amrabat	(Saudi Arabia) Al-Nassr	£4,000,000	
23 July 2018	CM	(Colombia)	Eduardo Montenegro	(Colombia) Envigado	Undisclosed	
24 July 2018	LW	(Brazil)	Richarlison	(England) Everton	£40,000,000	
30 July 2018	CB	(Portugal)	Marian Huja	(Denmark) Køge	Undisclosed	
7 August 2018	CF	(England)	Harvey Bradbury	(England) Oxford United	Free transfer	
20 August 2018	RB	(Ivory Coast)	Brice Dja Djédjé	(Turkey) Ankaragücü	Undisclosed	
21 December 2018	CB	(France)	Younès Kaboul	Unattached	Mutual consent	
7 January 2019	CF	(England)	Jubril Adedeji	(Denmark) Køge	Free transfer	
15 January 2019	LW	(England)	Dion Pereira	(United States) Atlanta United	Undisclosed	
18 January 2019	LW	(England)	Randell Williams	(England) Exeter City	Free transfer	

=== Loans out ===
Start date	Position	Nationality	Name	To	End date	Ref.
11 July 2018	CF	(Colombia)	Luis Suárez	(Spain) Gimnàstic de Tarragona	31 May 2019	
18 July 2018	CM	(Colombia)	Jaime Alvarado	(Spain) Hércules	31 May 2019	
20 July 2018	CF	(Colombia)	Juan Camilo Becerra	(Spain) Teruel	31 May 2019	
23 July 2018	RW	(Belgium)	Dodi Lukebakio	(Germany) Fortuna Düsseldorf	31 May 2019	
24 July 2018	CF	(England)	Harvey Bradbury	Hungerford Town	18 August 2018	
25 July 2018	CB	(Republic of Ireland)	Tommie Hoban	(Scotland) Aberdeen	31 May 2019	
25 July 2018	CF	(England)	Jerome Sinclair	Sunderland	10 January 2019	
27 July 2018	LW	(England)	Randell Williams	Wycombe Wanderers	2 January 2019	
30 July 2018	AM	(Brazil)	Matheus Santana	(Spain) Ejea	31 May 2019	
8 August 2018	GK	(Austria)	Daniel Bachmann	(Scotland) Kilmarnock	31 May 2019	
9 August 2018	CF	(Scotland)	Alex Jakubiak	Bristol Rovers	31 May 2019	
10 August 2018	LB	(Ecuador)	Pervis Estupiñán	(Spain) Mallorca	31 May 2019	
22 August 2018	CF	(Brazil)	Matheus Aias	(Spain) Mirandés	31 May 2019	
23 August 2018	RB	(Ghana)	Kingsley Fobi	(Spain) UD Ibiza	31 May 2019	
23 August 2018	RB	(France)	Dimitri Foulquier	(Spain) Getafe	31 May 2019	
23 August 2018	CF	(Belgium)	Obbi Oularé	(Belgium) Standard Liège	31 May 2019	
27 August 2018	CB	(Venezuela)	Williams Velásquez	(Spain) Sabadell	31 December 2018	
31 August 2018	CM	(The Gambia)	Sulayman Marreh	(Belgium) Eupen	31 May 2019	
27 December 2018	CB	(Colombia)	Jorge Segura	(Mexico) Atlas	31 May 2019	
1 January 2019	GK	(England)	Sam Howes	Eastbourne Borough	February 2019	
1 January 2019	CB	(Venezuela)	Williams Velásquez	(Japan) JEF United Chiba	2 January 2020	
5 January 2019	RB	(England)	Andrew Eleftheriou	Braintree Town	31 May 2019	
8 January 2019	CF	(Italy)	Stefano Okaka	(Italy) Udinese	30 June 2019	
10 January 2019	LB	(Netherlands)	Marvin Zeegelaar	(Italy) Udinese	30 June 2019	
31 January 2019	DF	(England)	Ashley Charles	Barnet	30 June 2019	
31 January 2019	FW	(England)	Michael Folivi	AFC Wimbledon	30 June 2019	
31 January 2019	CF	(England)	Jerome Sinclair	Oxford United	30 June 2019	
31 January 2019	CB	(England)	Ben Wilmot	(Italy) Udinese	30 June 2019	

== Friendlies ==
Watford confirmed pre-season friendlies with 1. FC Köln, Fortuna Düsseldorf, Stevenage, Brentford and Sampdoria.

17 July 2018 Friendly	1. FC Köln	1–1	Watford	Kitzbühel, Austria
18:30 CEST	Córdoba 56'	Report	Gray 6'	Stadium: Sportplatz Kitzbühel-Langau

21 July 2018 Friendly	Fortuna Düsseldorf	1–3	Watford	Kitzbühel, Austria
15:30 CEST	Hennings 25'	Report	Success 20'; Deeney 64'; Sinclair 86'	Stadium: Sportplatz Kitzbühel-Langau

27 July 2018 Friendly	Stevenage	0–1	Watford	Stevenage
19:30 BST		Report	Gray 88'	Stadium: Broadhall Way

28 July 2018 Friendly	Brentford	1–2	Watford	Brentford
15:00 BST	Watkins 5'	Report	Dalsgaard 25' (o.g.); Gray 36'	Stadium: Griffin Park

4 August 2018 Friendly	Watford	1–1	Sampdoria	Watford
15:00 BST	Deeney 53'	https://www.watfordfc.com/teams/first-team/GT Matchday: Watford 1-1 Sampdoria	Colley 8'	Stadium: Vicarage Road; Attendance: 6,332

== Competitions ==
=== Premier League ===
==== League table ====
Pos	Team	Pld	W	D	L	GF	GA	GD	Pts
9	Leicester City	38	15	7	16	51	48	+3	52
10	West Ham United	38	15	7	16	52	55	−3	52
11	Watford	38	14	8	16	52	59	−7	50
12	Crystal Palace	38	14	7	17	51	53	−2	49
13	Newcastle United	38	12	9	17	42	48	−6	45

Source: Premier League
Rules for classification: 1) Points; 2) Goal difference; 3) Goals scored; 4) Play-offs (only if needed to decide champion, teams for relegation or teams for UEFA competitions).

==== Results by matchday ====
Matchday	1	2	3	4	5	6	7	8	9	10	11	12	13	14	15	16	17	18	19	20	21	22	23	24	25	26	27	28	29	30	31	32	33	34	35	36	37	38
Ground	H	A	H	H	H	A	A	H	A	H	A	A	H	A	H	A	H	A	H	H	A	A	H	A	A	H	A	A	H	A	A	H	H	A	H	H	A	H
Result	W	W	W	W	L	D	L	L	W	W	L	D	L	L	L	D	W	W	L	D	D	W	D	L	D	W	W	L	W	L	L	W	L	W	D	L	L	L
Position	4	3	4	3	5	4	6	9	7	7	8	7	9	10	11	12	10	7	10	9	8	7	7	9	8	8	7	8	8	8	10	8	10	7	8	9	10	11

Updated to match(es) played on 12 May 2019. Source:
A = Away; H = Home; W = Win; D = Draw; L = Loss

==== Matches ====
On 14 June 2018, the Premier League fixtures for the forthcoming season were announced.

11 August 2018 1	Watford	2–0	Brighton & Hove Albion	Watford
15:00 BST	Pereyra 35', 54'; Capoue (yellow card) 64'; Holebas (yellow card) 73'	Report	Stephens (yellow card) 18'; Bernardo (yellow card) 81'	Stadium: Vicarage Road; Attendance: 20,051; Referee: Jonathan Moss

19 August 2018 2	Burnley	1–3	Watford	Burnley
13:30 BST	Tarkowski 6'; Ward (yellow card) 53'	Report	Gray 3'; Hughes (yellow card) 41', (goal) 51'; Deeney 48'; Janmaat (yellow card) 90+3'	Stadium: Turf Moor; Attendance: 18,822; Referee: Paul Tierney

25 August 2018 3	Watford	2–1	Crystal Palace	Watford
13:30 BST	Capoue (yellow card) 4'; Janmaat (yellow card) 37'; Pereyra 53', (yellow card) 86'; Holebas 71', (yellow card) 84'	Report	Zaha (yellow card) 7', (goal) 78'; Meyer (yellow card) 80'	Stadium: Vicarage Road; Attendance: 20,014; Referee: Anthony Taylor

2 September 2018 4	Watford	2–1	Tottenham Hotspur	Watford
16:00 BST	Capoue (yellow card) 52'; Deeney 69'; Cathcart 76'; Success (yellow card) 90+3'	Report	Doucouré 54' (o.g.); Dembélé (yellow card) 68'	Stadium: Vicarage Road; Attendance: 20,141; Referee: Andre Marriner

15 September 2018 5	Watford	1–2	Manchester United	Watford
17:30 BST	Capoue (yellow card) 34'; Holebas (yellow card) 36'; Gray 65'	Report	Lukaku 35'; Smalling 38'; Valencia (yellow card) 81'; Matić (yellow card) 70' (yellow-red card) 90+4'	Stadium: Vicarage Road; Attendance: 20,537; Referee: Mike Dean

22 September 2018 6	Fulham	1–1	Watford	Fulham
12:30 BST	Mawson (yellow card) 30'; Fosu-Mensah (yellow card) 32'; Mitrović 78'	Report	Gray 2'; Holebas (yellow card) 58'	Stadium: Craven Cottage; Attendance: 23,418; Referee: Martin Atkinson

29 September 2018 7	Arsenal	2–0	Watford	Holloway
15:00 BST	Torreira (yellow card) 45'; Mustafi (yellow card) 62'; Cathcart 81' (o.g.); Özil 83'	Report	Deeney (yellow card) 31'; Doucouré (yellow card) 79'	Stadium: Emirates Stadium; Attendance: 60,019; Referee: Anthony Taylor

6 October 2018 8	Watford	0–4	Bournemouth	Watford
15:00 BST	Cathcart (yellow card) 22'; Kabasele (yellow card) 11' (yellow-red card) 32'; Holebas (yellow card) 68'; Doucouré (yellow card) 89'	Report	Brooks 14'; King 33' (pen.), 45'; Wilson 47'; Surman (yellow card) 87'	Stadium: Vicarage Road; Attendance: 20,139; Referee: Jonathan Moss

20 October 2018 9	Wolverhampton Wanderers	0–2	Watford	Wolverhampton
15:00 BST	Neves (yellow card) 35'; Jota (yellow card) 73'; Bennett (yellow card) 90'	Report	Capoue 20'; Pereyra 21'; Hughes (yellow card) 69'	Stadium: Molineux; Attendance: 31,144; Referee: Lee Mason

27 October 2018 10	Watford	3–0	Huddersfield Town	Watford
15:00 BST	Pereyra 10'; Deulofeu 19'; Masina (yellow card) 67'; Success 80'	Report	Billing (yellow card) 34'; Mooy (yellow card) 86'	Stadium: Vicarage Road; Attendance: 20,457; Referee: Mike Dean

3 November 2018 11	Newcastle United	1–0	Watford	Newcastle upon Tyne
15:00 GMT	Pérez 65'; Schär (yellow card) 90+2'	Report	Capoue (yellow card) 38'; Hughes (yellow card) 64'; Okaka (yellow card) 84'; Holebas (yellow card) 90+2'; Gray (yellow card) 90+4'	Stadium: St James' Park; Attendance: 49,157; Referee: Craig Pawson

10 November 2018 12	Southampton	1–1	Watford	Southampton
15:00 GMT	Gabbiadini 20'; Bertrand (yellow card) 38'; Cédric (yellow card) 64'; Højbjerg (yellow card) 88'	Report	Chalobah (yellow card) 55'; Deulofeu (yellow card) 80'; Holebas 82'	Stadium: St Mary's Stadium; Attendance: 28,153; Referee: Simon Hooper

24 November 2018 13	Watford	0–3	Liverpool	Watford
15:00 GMT		Report	Henderson (yellow card) 60' (yellow-red card) 82'; Salah 67'; Alexander-Arnold 76'; Firmino 89'	Stadium: Vicarage Road; Attendance: 20,540; Referee: Jonathan Moss

1 December 2018 14	Leicester City	2–0	Watford	Leicester
15:00 GMT	Vardy 12' (pen.); Maddison 23', (yellow card) 90+4'; Albrighton (yellow card) 62'	Report	Success (yellow card) 85'; Capoue (red card) 90'	Stadium: King Power Stadium; Attendance: 31,353; Referee: Graham Scott

4 December 2018 15	Watford	1–2	Manchester City	Watford
20:00 GMT	Doucouré 85'	Report	Sané 40'; Mahrez 51'; Ederson (yellow card) 90'	Stadium: Vicarage Road; Attendance: 20,389; Referee: Paul Tierney

10 December 2018 16	Everton	2–2	Watford	Liverpool
20:00 GMT	Richarlison 15'; Digne 90+6'	Report	Coleman 63' (o.g.); Doucouré 65'	Stadium: Goodison Park; Attendance: 38,400; Referee: Kevin Friend

15 December 2018 17	Watford	3–2	Cardiff City	Watford
15:00 GMT	Deulofeu 16'; Holebas 52'; Quina 68'	Report	Hoilett 80'; Reid 82'	Stadium: Vicarage Road; Attendance: 20,032; Referee: Andrew Madley

22 December 2018 18	West Ham United	0–2	Watford	Stratford
15:00 GMT	Balbuena (yellow card) 27'; Antonio (yellow card) 69'; Diop (yellow card) 90+3'	Report	Deeney 30' (pen.); Kabasele (yellow card) 55'; Holebas (yellow card) 60'; Deulofeu 87'	Stadium: London Stadium; Attendance: 56,833; Referee: Lee Mason

26 December 2018 19	Watford	1–2	Chelsea	Watford
19:30 GMT	Pereyra 45+3'; Foster (yellow card) 58'	Report	Hazard 45+1', 58' (pen.)	Stadium: Vicarage Road; Attendance: 20,415; Referee: Martin Atkinson

29 December 2018 20	Watford	1–1	Newcastle United	Watford
15:00 GMT	Doucouré 82'	Report	Rondón 29'	Stadium: Vicarage Road; Attendance: 20,336; Referee: Roger East

2 January 2019 21	Bournemouth	3–3	Watford	Boscombe
19:45 GMT	Aké 34'; Wilson 37'; Fraser 40'; Gosling (yellow card) 60'	Report	Deeney 14', 27', (yellow card) 33'; Doucouré (yellow card) 29'; Sema 38'; Capoue (yellow card) 50'; Holebas (yellow card) 89'	Stadium: Dean Court; Attendance: 10,261; Referee: David Coote

12 January 2019 22	Crystal Palace	1–2	Watford	Selhurst
15:00 GMT	Cathcart 38' (o.g.); Milivojević (yellow card) 84'	Report	Femenía (yellow card) 61'; Sema (yellow card) 65'; Cathcart 67'; Cleverley 74', (yellow card) 90+4'; Pereyra (yellow card) 90+1'	Stadium: Selhurst Park; Attendance: 25,010; Referee: Paul Tierney

19 January 2019 23	Watford	0–0	Burnley	Watford
15:00 GMT	Deulofeu (yellow card) 79'	Report	Mee (yellow card) 63'; Bardsley (yellow card) 82'	Stadium: Vicarage Road; Attendance: 19,510; Referee: Michael Oliver

30 January 2019 24	Tottenham Hotspur	2–1	Watford	Wembley
20:00 GMT	Son 80'; Llorente 87'	Report	Cathcart 38'; Mariappa (yellow card) 46'; Capoue (yellow card) 74'; Holebas (yellow card) 90+1'; Success (yellow card) 90+3'	Stadium: Wembley Stadium; Attendance: 29,164; Referee: Graham Scott

2 February 2019 25	Brighton & Hove Albion	0–0	Watford	Falmer
15:00 GMT	Pröpper (yellow card) 33'	Report		Stadium: Falmer Stadium; Attendance: 30,414; Referee: Simon Hooper

9 February 2019 26	Watford	1–0	Everton	Watford
15:00 GMT	Gray 65'; Deeney (yellow card) 70'; Holebas (yellow card) 83'	Report	Zouma (yellow card) 90+5' (yellow-red card) 90+5'	Stadium: Vicarage Road; Attendance: 20,333; Referee: Lee Probert

22 February 2019 27	Cardiff City	1–5	Watford	Cardiff
19:45 GMT	Bamba 82'; Paterson (yellow card) 85'	Report	Deulofeu 18', 61', 63'; Capoue (yellow card) 30'; Pereyra (yellow card) 55'; Deeney 73', 90+1'	Stadium: Cardiff City Stadium; Attendance: 30,387; Referee: Simon Hooper

27 February 2019 28	Liverpool	5–0	Watford	Liverpool
20:00 GMT	Mané 9', 20'; Origi 66'; Van Dijk 79', 82'	Report	Cathcart (yellow card) 79'; Masina (yellow card) 82'	Stadium: Anfield; Attendance: 53,316; Referee: Graham Scott

3 March 2019 29	Watford	2–1	Leicester City	Watford
12:00 GMT	Deeney 5' (yellow card) 62'; Mariappa (yellow card) 13'; Capoue (yellow card) 60'; Doucouré (yellow card) 61'; Gray 90+2', (yellow card) 90+3'	Report	Vardy 75'; Pereira (yellow card) 84'	Stadium: Vicarage Road; Attendance: 20,062; Referee: Jonathan Moss

9 March 2019 30	Manchester City	3–1	Watford	Manchester
17:30 GMT	Walker (yellow card) 6'; Sterling 46', 50', 59'	Report	Cleverley (yellow card) 18'; Deulofeu 66'	Stadium: Etihad Stadium; Attendance: 54,104; Referee: Paul Tierney

30 March 2019 31	Manchester United	2–1	Watford	Trafford
15:00 GMT	Rashford 28'; Martial 72'; Pereira (yellow card) 90+2'	Report	Hughes (yellow card) 17'; Masina (yellow card) 82'; Doucouré 90'	Stadium: Old Trafford; Attendance: 74,543; Referee: Stuart Attwell

2 April 2019 32	Watford	4–1	Fulham	Watford
19:45 BST	Doucouré 23'; Mariappa (yellow card) 44'; Janmaat (yellow card) 47'; Hughes 63'; Deeney 69'; Femenía 75'; Holebas (yellow card) 90'	Report	Babel 33'; Chambers (yellow card) 66'; Christie (yellow card) 90+1'	Stadium: Vicarage Road; Attendance: 17,301; Referee: Roger East

15 April 2019 33	Watford	0–1	Arsenal	Watford
20:00 BST	Deeney (red card) 11'; Capoue (yellow card) 54'; Hughes (yellow card) 86'	Report	Aubameyang 10'	Stadium: Vicarage Road; Attendance: 20,480; Referee: Craig Pawson

20 April 2019 34	Huddersfield Town	1–2	Watford	Huddersfield
15:00 BST	Hogg (yellow card) 19'; Bacuna (yellow card) 24'; Grant 90+3'	Report	Deulofeu 5', 80'; Capoue (yellow card) 17'; Doucouré (yellow card) 90+1'	Stadium: John Smith's Stadium; Attendance: 23,957; Referee: Roger East

23 April 2019 35	Watford	1–1	Southampton	Watford
19:45 BST	Capoue (yellow card) 26'; Doucouré (yellow card) 40'; Deulofeu (yellow card) 57'; Kabasele (yellow card) 75'; Masina (yellow card) 80'; Gray 90'	Report	Long 1'; Romeu (yellow card) 17'; Bednarek (yellow card) 45+2'	Stadium: Vicarage Road; Attendance: 19,170; Referee: Mike Dean

27 April 2019 36	Watford	1–2	Wolverhampton Wanderers	Watford
15:00 BST	Gray 49'; Holebas (yellow card) 62'; Success (yellow card) 85'; Capoue (yellow card) 90+6'	Report	Jiménez 41'; Moutinho (yellow card) 61'; Jota 77', (yellow card) 84'	Stadium: Vicarage Road; Attendance: 20,323; Referee: Simon Hooper

5 May 2019 37	Chelsea	3–0	Watford	Fulham
14:00 BST	Loftus-Cheek 48'; David Luiz 51'; Higuaín 75'	Report	Doucouré (yellow card) 90'	Stadium: Stamford Bridge; Attendance: 40,650; Referee: Paul Tierney

12 May 2019 38	Watford	1–4	West Ham United	Watford
15:00 BST	Deulofeu 46'; Holebas (red card) 48'; Capoue (yellow card) 90+1'	Report	Noble 15', 78' (pen.); Lanzini 39'; Arnautović 71'	Stadium: Vicarage Road; Attendance: 20,067; Referee: Chris Kavanagh

=== FA Cup ===
The third round draw was made live on BBC by Ruud Gullit and Paul Ince from Stamford Bridge on 3 December 2018. The fourth round draw was made live on BBC by Robbie Keane and Carl Ikeme from Wolverhampton on 7 January 2019. The fifth round draw was broadcast on 28 January 2019 live on BBC, Alex Scott and Ian Wright conducted the draw. The draw for the quarter-finals was made on 18 February by Darren Fletcher & Wayne Bridge.

6 January 2019 Third round	Woking	0–2	Watford	Woking
14:00 GMT	Gerring (yellow card) 29'	Report	Hughes 13'; Success (yellow card) 14'; Deeney 74'	Stadium: Kingfield Stadium; Attendance: 5,717; Referee: Graham Scott

26 January 2019 Fourth round	Newcastle United	0–2	Watford	Newcastle upon Tyne
15:00 GMT	Longstaff (yellow card) 90+3'	Report	Wilmot (yellow card) 56'; Gray 61'; Chalobah (yellow card) 64'; Britos (yellow card) 75'; Success 90'	Stadium: St James' Park; Attendance: 34,604; Referee: David Coote

15 February 2019 Fifth round	Queens Park Rangers	0–1	Watford	Shepherd's Bush
19:45 GMT	Luongo (yellow card) 73'	Report	Capoue 45+1'; Mariappa (yellow card) 76'; Doucouré (yellow card) 86'; Janmaat (yellow card) 90+1'	Stadium: Loftus Road; Attendance: 17,212; Referee: Michael Oliver

16 March 2019 Quarter-finals	Watford	2–1	Crystal Palace	Watford
12:15 GMT	Capoue 27'; Gray 79'	Report	Batshuayi 62'	Stadium: Vicarage Road; Attendance: 18,104; Referee: Kevin Friend

7 April 2019 Semi-finals	Watford	3–2 (a.e.t.)	Wolverhampton Wanderers	Wembley
16:00 BST	Cathcart (yellow card) 54'; Holebas (yellow card) 61'; Deulofeu 79', 104'; Deeney 90+4' (pen.); Capoue (yellow card) 101'	Report	Saïss (yellow card) 10'; Neves (yellow card) 25'; Doherty 36'; Jiménez 62'	Stadium: Wembley; Attendance: 80,092; Referee: Michael Oliver

18 May 2019 Final	Manchester City	6–0	Watford	Wembley
17:00 BST	D. Silva 26', (yellow card) 60'; Jesus 38', 68'; De Bruyne 61'; Sterling 81', 87'	Report	Doucouré (yellow card) 22'; Femenía (yellow card) 80'	Stadium: Wembley; Attendance: 85,854; Referee: Kevin Friend

=== EFL Cup ===
The second round draw was made from the Stadium of Light on 16 August. The third round draw was made on 30 August 2018 by David Seaman and Joleon Lescott.

29 August 2018 Second round	Reading	0–2	Watford	Reading
20:00 BST	Méïté (yellow card) 89'	Report	Success 37'; Quina 62'; Navarro (yellow card) 90+3'	Stadium: Madejski Stadium; Attendance: 9,265; Referee: Andy Davies

26 September 2018 Third round	Tottenham Hotspur	2–2 (4–2 p)	Watford	Milton Keynes
20:00 BST	Alli 82' (pen.); Lamela 86', (yellow card) 87'	Report	Success 46'; Kabasele (red card) 81'; Capoue 89'	Stadium: Stadium MK; Attendance: 23,650; Referee: Lee Mason
	Penalties
	Son (penalty scored); Lamela (penalty scored); Llorente (penalty scored); Alli (penalty scored)		(penalty scored) Success; (penalty missed) Capoue; (penalty scored) Hughes; (penalty missed) Quina
Note: This match was moved to Stadium MK in Milton Keynes, as neither Wembley Stadium nor Tottenham Hotspur Stadium were available to host.

== Appearances and goals ==
No.	Pos	Nat	Player	Total		Premier League		FA Cup		League Cup	
No.	Pos	Nat	Player	Apps	Goals	Apps	Goals	Apps	Goals	Apps	Goals
Goalkeepers
1	GK	(Brazil) BRA	Heurelho Gomes	8	0	0	0	6	0	2	0
26	GK	(England) ENG	Ben Foster	38	0	38	0	0	0	0	0
Defenders
2	DF	(Netherlands) NED	Daryl Janmaat	22	0	17+1	0	3+1	0	0	0
3	DF	(Uruguay) URU	Miguel Britos	6	0	2+1	0	3	0	0	0
5	DF	(Austria) AUT	Sebastian Prödl	2	0	0+1	0	0	0	1	0
6	DF	(Jamaica) JAM	Adrian Mariappa	32	0	20+6	0	3+1	0	2	0
11	DF	(Italy) ITA	Adam Masina	20	0	11+3	0	2+2	0	2	0
15	DF	(Northern Ireland) NIR	Craig Cathcart	41	3	35+1	3	4	0	1	0
21	DF	(Spain) ESP	Kiko Femenía	34	1	22+7	1	3	0	2	0
23	DF	(Spain) ESP	Marc Navarro	5	0	1+1	0	0+1	0	2	0
25	DF	(Greece) GRE	José Holebas	32	3	27+1	3	4	0	0	0
27	DF	(Belgium) BEL	Christian Kabasele	23	0	19+2	0	1	0	0+1	0
Midfielders
8	MF	(England) ENG	Tom Cleverley	17	1	4+9	1	2+2	0	0	0
12	MF	(Sweden) SWE	Ken Sema	22	1	9+8	1	1+2	0	2	0
14	MF	(England) ENG	Nathaniel Chalobah	13	0	3+6	0	2	0	2	0
16	MF	(France) FRA	Abdoulaye Doucouré	40	5	34+1	5	3+1	0	0+1	0
19	MF	(England) ENG	Will Hughes	40	3	31+1	2	6	1	0+2	0
20	MF	(Portugal) POR	Domingos Quina	13	2	3+5	1	2+1	0	2	1
29	MF	(France) FRA	Étienne Capoue	39	4	33	1	4+1	2	0+1	1
37	MF	(Argentina) ARG	Roberto Pereyra	36	6	33	6	3	0	0	0
Forwards
7	FW	(Spain) ESP	Gerard Deulofeu	33	12	26+4	10	2+1	2	0	0
9	FW	(England) ENG	Troy Deeney	37	11	28+4	9	4+1	2	0	0
10	FW	(Nigeria) NGA	Isaac Success	35	4	9+21	1	2+1	1	2	2
17	FW	(Venezuela) VEN	Adalberto Peñaranda	2	0	0	0	1+1	0	0	0
18	FW	(England) ENG	Andre Gray	34	9	13+16	7	3+2	2	0	0
Players transferred out during the season
24	DF	(England) ENG	Ben Wilmot	6	0	0+2	0	2	0	2	0
33	FW	(Italy) ITA	Stefano Okaka	3	0	0+2	0	0	0	0+1	0

Last updated: 18 May 2019
Source: Competitions
