= Gartside =

Gartside is a surname. Notable people with the surname include:

- Anthony Edgar Gartside Wright or Antony Grey (1927–2010), English LGBT rights activist
- Bob Gartside (1906–1970), English footballer
- Charles Gartside (1887–1958), Australian politician
- Green Gartside (born 1955), British musician, Scritti Politti
- Henry Gartside Neville (1837–1910), English actor, dramatist, teacher and theatre manager
- Jack Gartside, American fly tyer and fly fishing author
- Mary Gartside (c. 1755–1819), English water colourist and colour theorist
- Nathan Gartside (born 1998), Northern Irish football goalkeeper
- Phil Gartside (1952–2016), businessman and chairman of Bolton Wanderers Football Club

== See also ==
- Henry Gartside Neville (1837–1910), English actor, dramatist, teacher and theatre manager
- Gartside v Sheffield, a New Zealand legal case about liability for negligence cases against lawyers
- Garside, surname
