= Cholevas =

Cholevas (Greek: Χολέβας) is a Greek surname. It is also commonly pronounced as Choleva (Greek: Χολέβα). Notable people with the surname include:

- José Cholevas (born 1984), Greek professional footballer
- Themis Cholevas (1926–2007), Greek former professional basketball player
