= Thomas Hamilton Garside =

Scottish trade unionist (1855–1927)

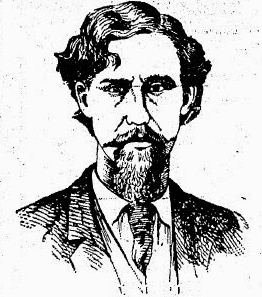
- Illustration of Garside (1890)
- Born: Thomas Douglas Hamilton Garside; 1855; Lancashire, England, United Kingdom
- Died: 21 October 1927 (aged 71–72); Chelsea, London, United Kingdom
- Education: Stockholm University
- Political party: Liberal Party (from 1914)
- Other political affiliations: Socialist Labor Party of America (1887–1889); International Working People's Association (1889–1891); Independent Labour Party (1893–c. 1914)
- Movement: Labour movement
- Spouse: Emma Mary Goldman (m. 1884)
- Children: 5

Thomas Douglas Hamilton Garside (1855–1927) was a Scottish mathematics professor and trade union leader. The son of a Scottish railroad contractor, he became an evangelical preacher in Northern Ireland, before moving to the United States. In Philadelphia, he joined the socialist movement and became an organiser for the Knights of Labor. By 1889, he had gravitated towards anarchism and was expelled from the Socialist Labor Party of America. The following year, he led a cloakmakers' strike in New York City, along with Emma Goldman and Joseph Barondess. After the strike achieved its goals, he returned to Philadelphia, where he allegedly became a United States Marshal. By 1893, he had returned to Britain, where he joined the Independent Labour Party (ILP) and organised for tenants' rights. During World War I, he joined the Liberal Party, within which he agitated for welfare and pensions for veterans. He died in London in 1927.

== Biography ==
=== Early life ===
Thomas Douglas Hamilton Garside was born in Lancashire, in 1855, the son of a Scottish railroad contractor. He was educated at Stockholm University and remained in the city after graduation, teaching mathematics at a secondary school. He then followed his father's wishes that he become a preacher and moved to Northern Ireland, where he preached the gospel for seven years.

=== Socialist activism in the United States ===
In 1881, he immigrated to the United States, initially settling in Baltimore before moving to Philadelphia, where he worked as a tutor for aspiring college students. Before long, the former evangelical preacher had become a socialist. He soon quit his tutoring job and moved into trade union organising, joining the Socialist Labor Party (SLP) and the Knights of Labor.

On 8 May 1884, Garside married Emma Mary Goldman, (Note: Not to be confused with the anarchist activist Emma Goldman.), the daughter of a well-off farmer from Berks County, Pennsylvania. In 1888, he had an affair with the anarchist Voltairine de Cleyre. In a poem about Garside, de Cleyre wrote lovingly of his "tender mouth and Christ-like eyes", as well as his voice, which she described as "sweet as the summer wind that sighs through the arbors of Paradise." Despite warnings from Dyer Lum, who told her that Garside was "vain and self-indulgent", de Cleyre fell deeply in love with him. According to historian Paul Avrich, "for all his charm and glib phrasemaking," Garside turned out to be "superficial, egotistical, and callous." After a few months of their affair, Garside abandoned de Cleyre, which left her feeling hurt and betrayed. She wrote several poems about her rejection, moved back into her family home in St. Johns, Michigan, where she lived in distress. She was cared for in the aftermath of the affair by Lum himself, who she fell in love with.

In January 1889, Garside attended a Knights of Labor meeting in Chicago, where he was scheduled to give a lecture on behalf of the SLP. The meeting was chaired by Lizzie Holmes, who had invited the anarchist Lucy Parsons to speak at the meeting before Garside. After Parsons' 90 minute speech, Garside stood up to give his 30-minute lecture. Garside had himself been invited to the meeting by the SLP's leader Thomas J. Morgan, who hoped to have an ally against Parsons, but Garside instead aligned himself with the anarchists. While Garside himself expressed concerns about the anarchists' violent tactics, he also dismissed electoralism, and distinguished between codified law and natural law. Morgan quickly denounced Garside, declaring that at the meeting he had "disgusted all the socialists while the anarchists roared with delight." Morgan's speech was interrupted by the audience when he mentioned Garside, who they applauded. Dismayed by his defeat at the meeting, Morgan had expelled Garside from the SLP.

=== Leadership of the 1890 cloakmakers' strike ===
In 1889, Garside moved to New York City, where he joined the International Working People's Association (IWPA), spoke alongside Johann Most at its meetings and published a pamphlet that critiqued modern industrialisation, which sold 15,000 copies. By this time, Garside had become concerned with improving living and working conditions for the city's Jewish immigrants, organising mutual aid societies for their benefit. In 1890, Jewish workers in New York's cloakmaking industry had organised a mass strike movement, 3,000 workers strong, led by Joseph Barondess under the banner of the United Hebrew Trades. Seeking anarchist support for the strike, Barondess invited the Jewish anarchist Emma Goldman, as well as Garside himself, to help lead the strike action.

When Goldman met Garside during the strike, she described him as "tall, pale, and languid-looking. His manner was gentle and ingratiating, and he resembled somewhat the pictures of Christ." Goldman recalled that "He was always trying to pacify conflicting elements, to smooth things over." An article about the strike in The Midland Journal described him as "a man who impresses one with the idea that his store of nervous energy must be almost inexhaustible, and his frank manner and pleasant voice bind to him the confidence of his followers, and enable him to sway the passions of those toilers who have learned to believe him almost infallible. He is a tall, well built, rather handsome man, with curling brown hair, mustache and imperial. He wears a black slouch hat and dresses plainly." Chaim Leib Weinberg recalled Garside leading a parade on International Workers' Day of 1890, which was so large that the press began to panic, "terrified that social revolution in America was imminent".

Garside secured strike pay for the cloakmakers, and gained the support from Jewish anarchists after he spoke in favour of "propaganda of the deed" and against electoralism. He was elected to represent the union, in negotiations for a settlement with their employers. But as the terms of the settlement did not include the dismissal of strikebreakers or the fixing of wages, the union rejected the settlement and continued the strike until their demands were met. The strike achieved its goals and ended in July 1890, after which Garside returned to Philadelphia.

In June 1891, the New York Times published a story alleging that Garside had become a deputy of the United States Marshals Service, although the story's accuracy wasn't verified. The anarchists' influence within the cloakmakers' union was greatly undermined by the scandal. Garside himself subsequently disappeared from American historical record.

=== Return to Britain and later life ===
By 1893, Garside had returned to Britain and settled in Broughton, where he joined the Independent Labour Party (ILP) and became involved in tenants rights struggles. He wrote about the exploitation of tenant-workers in Ancoats by the Manchester Corporation, and was involved in a litigation case against landlords by the Lancashire and Cheshire Society of Stallholders. At the second conference of the ILP in 1894, Garside represented the Women's National Assotiation of the ILP as a delegate from Manchester; he proposed that the ILP headquarters be moved to Manchester, which he pointed out had been the centre of the independent labour movement.

During World War I, Garside and Liberal Party MP James Hogge became concerned with the welfare of veterans. In mid-January 1917, Garside and Hogge established the Naval and Military War Pensions and Welfare league, a national organisation created to push for military pensions after demobilisation. In 1918, Hogge and Garside published a report on the matter, in the book War Pensions and Allowances. Garside ran as the Liberal candidate in Ilford for the 1918 United Kingdom general election, but came last place with 13.7% of the vote, losing to the Conservative candidate Peter Griggs. After the war, he served as secretary of the National Federation of Discharged and Demobilised Sailors and Soldiers (NFDDSS).

Thomas Hamilton Garside died in the London borough of Chelsea, on 21 October 1927.

== Selected works ==
- A Critique of the Present Industrial System (1889)
- The Horrors of Ancoats (1893) OCLC 80365117
- Mr Nobody, of Nowhere, and Nan (1895, The Market Street Press Works) OCLC 1056039856
- War Pensions And Allowances (1918, Hodder and Stoughton) OCLC 3733305

== Bibliography ==
- Ashbaugh, Carolyn (1976). Lucy Parsons, American Revolutionary. Chicago: Charles H. Kerr Publishing Company. ISBN 0-88286-005-4.
- Avrich, Paul (1978). "The Making of an Anarchist". An American Anarchist: The Life of Voltairine de Cleyre. Princeton: Princeton University Press. pp. 38–69. ISBN 978-0-691-04657-0.
- Ewing, Edwin E., ed. (22 August 1890). "A Good Leader: Thomas H. Garside, Head of the New York Cloakmakers' Latest Controversy". The Midland Journal. Vol. 12, no. 49. p. 1.
- Goyens, Tom (2007). "German Anarchists in Progressive New York". Beer and Revolution: The German Anarchist Movement in New York City, 1880-1914. University of Illinois Press. pp. 183–220. ISBN 978-0-252-03175-5.
- Weinberg, Chaim Leib (2008). Helms, Robert P. (ed.). Forty Years in the Struggle: The Memoirs of a Jewish Anarchist. Translated by Cohen, Naomi. Duluth: Litwin Books. ISBN 978-0-9802004-3-0.
- Zimmer, Kenyon (2010). "The whole world is our country": Immigration and anarchism in the United States, 1885–1940 (Thesis). University of Pittsburgh. ProQuest 3435561.
- Zimmer, Kenyon (2015). ""Yiddish Is My Homeland": Jewish Anarchists in New York City". Immigrants against the State: Yiddish and Italian Anarchism in America. Chicago: University of Illinois Press. ISBN 978-0-252-03938-6.
