= 2014–15 AS Roma season =

Roma
2014–15 season
- President: James Pallotta
- Manager: Rudi Garcia
- Stadium: Stadio Olimpico
- Serie A: 2nd
- Coppa Italia: Quarter-finals
- UEFA Champions League: Group stage
- UEFA Europa League: Round of 16
- Top goalscorer: League: Adem Ljajić; Francesco Totti (8 each); All: Francesco Totti (10)
- Highest home attendance: 70,544 vs Bayern Munich (21 October 2014, Champions League)
- Lowest home attendance: 11,019 vs Empoli (20 January 2015, Coppa Italia)
- Average home league attendance: 40,135
Home colours	Away colours	Third colours

The 2014–15 season was Associazione Sportiva Roma's 87th in existence and 86th season in the top flight of Italian football. The team competed in Serie A, the Coppa Italia, the Champions League, and the Europa League. Roma finished second behind Juventus for the second consecutive season after a poor run of form in 2015. The club finished third in their Champions League group and thus dropped down to the Europa League, where they were knocked out by Fiorentina in the Round of 16. Incidentally, Roma were also knocked out of the Coppa Italia by Fiorentina at the quarter-final stage, losing 2–0 at the Stadio Olimpico.

== Players ==
=== Squad information ===
Last updated on 31 May 2015
Appearances include league matches only

No.	Name	Nat	Position(s)	Date of birth (Age at end of season)	Signed from	Signed in	Apps.	Goals
Goalkeepers
1	Bogdan Lobonț	(Romania)	GK	18 January 1978 (aged 37)	(Romania) Dinamo București	2009	28	0
26	Morgan De Sanctis	(Italy)	GK	30 March 1977 (aged 38)	(Italy) Napoli	2013	78	0
28	Łukasz Skorupski	(Poland)	GK	5 May 1991 (aged 24)	(Poland) Górnik Zabrze	2013	5	0
Defenders
2	Mapou Yanga-Mbiwa	(France)	CB	15 May 1989 (aged 26)	(England) Newcastle United	2014	28	1
3	Ashley Cole	(England)	LB	20 December 1980 (aged 34)	(England) Chelsea	2014	11	0
5	Leandro Castán	(Brazil)	CB	5 November 1986 (aged 28)	(Brazil) Corinthians	2012	67	1
13	Maicon	(Brazil)	RB	26 July 1981 (aged 33)	(England) Manchester City	2013	42	3
23	Davide Astori	(Italy)	CB	7 January 1987 (aged 28)	(Italy) Cagliari	2014	24	1
25	José Holebas	(Greece)	LB	27 June 1984 (aged 31)	(Greece) Olympiacos	2014	25	1
33	Nicolás Spolli	(Argentina)	CB	20 February 1983 (aged 32)	(Italy) Catania	2015	1	0
35	Vasilis Torosidis	(Greece)	RB / LB	10 June 1985 (aged 30)	(Greece) Olympiacos	2013	60	4
42	Federico Balzaretti	(Italy)	LB	6 December 1981 (aged 33)	(Italy) Palermo	2012	39	1
44	Kostas Manolas	(Greece)	CB	14 June 1991 (aged 24)	(Greece) Olympiacos	2014	67	2
Midfielders
4	Radja Nainggolan	(Belgium)	DM / CM	4 May 1989 (aged 26)	(Italy) Cagliari	2014	52	7
6	Kevin Strootman	(Netherlands)	DM / CM	13 February 1990 (aged 25)	(Netherlands) PSV Eindhoven	2013	31	5
15	Miralem Pjanić	(Bosnia and Herzegovina)	CM / AM	2 April 1990 (aged 25)	(France) Lyon	2011	126	17
16	Daniele De Rossi (Vice-Captain)	(Italy)	DM / CM	24 July 1983 (aged 31)	(Italy) Youth Sector	2001	364	36
20	Seydou Keita	(Mali)	DM / CM	16 January 1980 (aged 35)	(Spain) Valencia	2014	26	2
24	Alessandro Florenzi	(Italy)	RB / CM / RW	11 March 1991 (aged 24)	(Italy) Youth Sector	2011	109	21
32	Leandro Paredes	(Argentina)	DM / CM	29 June 1994 (aged 21)	(Argentina) Boca Juniors	2014	10	1
48	Salih Uçan	(Turkey)	CM / AM	6 January 1994 (aged 21)	(Turkey) Fenerbahçe	2014	4	0
52	Lorenzo Pellegrini	(Italy)	AM / CM	19 June 1996 (aged 19)	(Italy) Youth Sector	2014	1	0
Forwards
7	Juan Iturbe	(Argentina)	SS / LW / RW	4 June 1993 (aged 22)	(Italy) Hellas Verona	2014	39	3
8	Adem Ljajić	(Serbia)	LW / RW / SS / AM	29 September 1991 (aged 23)	(Italy) Fiorentina	2013	60	14
10	Francesco Totti (Captain)	(Italy)	AM / LW / SS / CF / ST	27 September 1976 (aged 38)	(Italy) Youth Sector	1992	588	243
19	Víctor Ibarbo	(Colombia)	LW / RW	19 May 1990 (aged 25)	(Italy) Cagliari	2015	10	0
27	Gervinho	(Ivory Coast)	LW / RW / SS	27 May 1987 (aged 28)	(England) Arsenal	2013	57	11
53	Daniele Verde	(Italy)	CF	20 June 1996 (aged 19)	(Italy) Youth Sector	2014	7	0
88	Seydou Doumbia	(Ivory Coast)	CF / SS	31 December 1987 (aged 27)	(Russia) CSKA Moscow	2015	13	2
96	Antonio Sanabria	(Paraguay)	CF / ST	4 March 1996 (aged 19)	(Italy) Sassuolo	2014	2	0
Players transferred during the season
9	Marco Borriello	(Italy)	CF / ST	18 June 1982 (aged 33)	(Italy) Milan	2010	52	12
22	Mattia Destro	(Italy)	CF / ST	20 March 1991 (aged 24)	(Italy) Siena	2012	57	24
50	Michele Somma	(Italy)	CB	16 March 1995 (aged 20)	(Italy) Youth Sector	2014	1	0
82	Urby Emanuelson	(Netherlands)	LB / LM / DM / CM	16 June 1986 (aged 29)	(Italy) Milan	2014	20	2

== Transfers ==
=== In ===
Date	Pos	Name	From	Fee
21 June 2014	CB	(Italy) Simone Sini	(Italy) Perugia	— (Co-ownership resolved)
21 June 2014	AM	(Italy) Stefano Pettinari	(Italy) Crotone	€500,000 (Co-ownership resolved)
1 July 2014	AM	(Italy) Matteo Ricci	(Italy) Grosseto	€200,000 (Counter-option bought back)
1 July 2014	CM	(Italy) Federico Viviani	(Italy) Latina	€200,000 (Counter-option bought back)
1 July 2014	AM	(Italy) Marco D'Alessandro	(Italy) Cesena	€500,000 (Counter-option bought back)
1 July 2014	CM	(Mali) Seydou Keita	(Spain) Valencia	Free
1 July 2014	CF	(Paraguay) Antonio Sanabria	(Italy) Sassuolo	Moved via Sassuolo (possible €11,000,000 future fee to Barcelona)
6 July 2014	LB	(England) Ashley Cole	(England) Chelsea	Free
11 July 2014	LB	(Netherlands) Urby Emanuelson	(Italy) Milan	Free
16 July 2014	RW	(Argentina) Juan Iturbe	(Italy) Hellas Verona	€22,000,000
– July 2014	AM	(Argentina) Alan Arario	(Argentina) River Plate	Free
26 August 2014	DF	(Greece) Kostas Manolas	(Greece) Olympiacos	€13,000,000 (Possible extra €2,000,000 fee)
28 August 2014	RW	(Colombia) Carlos Carbonero	(Argentina) Estudiantes	Undisclosed fee
31 August 2014	DF	(Greece) José Holebas	(Greece) Olympiacos	€1,000,000
27 January 2015	CB	(France) Mapou Yanga-Mbiwa	(England) Newcastle United	€6,500,000
31 January 2015	FW	(Ivory Coast) Seydou Doumbia	(Russia) CSKA Moscow	€14,400,000

==== Loans in ====
Date	Pos.	Name	From	Fee
7 July 2014	CM	(Turkey) Salih Uçan	(Turkey) Fenerbahçe	€4,750,000 (possible future fee €11,000,000)
18 July 2014	CAM	(Argentina) Leandro Paredes	(Argentina) Boca Juniors	Free
18 July 2014	CB	(Italy) Davide Astori	(Italy) Cagliari	€2,000,000 (option to buy for €5,000,000)
1 September 2014	CB	(France) Mapou Yanga-Mbiwa	(England) Newcastle United	€1,260,000 (option to buy for €6,500,000)
1 February 2015	FW	(Colombia) Víctor Ibarbo	(Italy) Cagliari	€2,500,000 (option to buy for €12,500,000)
2 February 2015	DF	(Argentina) Nicolás Spolli	(Italy) Catania	€1,500,000 (option to buy for €1,500,000)

Total spending: ▼€44,310,000

=== Out ===
Date	Pos.	Name	To	Fee
21 June 2014	CF	(Uruguay) Nicolás López	(Italy) Udinese	€2,000,000 (Co-ownership resolved)
21 June 2014	CM	(Italy) Stefano Sabelli	(Italy) Bari	€600,000 (Co-ownership resolved)
4 July 2014	RW	(Italy) Marco D'Alessandro	(Italy) Atalanta	€2,000,000
12 July 2014	CM	(Italy) Valerio Verre	(Italy) Udinese	€935,000
14 July 2014	LW	(Italy) Marco Frediani	(Italy) Pisa	Undisclosed
21 July 2014	LM	(Brazil) Rodrigo Taddei	(Italy) Perugia	Free
27 August 2014	DF	(Morocco) Medhi Benatia	(Germany) Bayern Munich	€26,000,000 (Possible extra €4,000,000 fee)

==== Loans out ====
Date	Pos.	Name	To	Fee
11 June 2014	CB	(Croatia) Tin Jedvaj	(Germany) Bayer Leverkusen	€1,000,000
1 July 2014	CB	(Brazil) Rafael Toloi	(Brazil) São Paulo	Loan return
1 July 2014	LB	(Brazil) Michel Bastos	(United Arab Emirates) Al Ain	Loan return
4 July 2014	CM	(Brazil) Marquinho	(Saudi Arabia) Al-Ittihad	€1,000,000
8 July 2014	LB	(Brazil) Dodô	(Italy) Internazionale	€1,200,000 (permanent transfer for €7,800,000 after one match)
14 July 2014	AM	(Italy) Amato Ciciretti	(Italy) Pistoiese	—
5 August 2014	CM	(Italy) Federico Viviani	(Italy) Latina	—
28 August 2014	RW	(Colombia) Carlos Carbonero	(Italy) Cesena	-
1 September 2014	CB	(Italy) Alessio Romagnoli	(Italy) Sampdoria	€500,000
21 January 2015	MF	(Netherlands) Urby Emanuelson	(Italy) Atalanta	Free
30 January 2015	FW	(Italy) Mattia Destro	(Italy) Milan	€700,000 (option to buy for €16,000,000)

Total income: ▲€35,235,000
Net income: ▼€9,075,000

== Pre-season and friendlies ==
18 July 2014 Friendly	Roma (Italy)	3–1	Indonesia U-23	Rieti, Italy
17:30 CEST (UTC+02:00)	Florenzi 7'; Uçan 12'; Borriello 90+1'		Rasyid 56'	Stadium: Stadio Centro d'Italia – Manlio Scopigno

24 July 2014 Friendly	Liverpool (England)	0–1	(Italy) Roma	Boston, Massachusetts, United States
00:30 BST (UTC+01:00)		Report	Borriello 43'	Stadium: Fenway Park; Referee: Alan Kelly (United States)

10 August 2014 Friendly	SV Eltendorf (Austria)	0–5	(Italy) Roma	Eltendorf, Austria
CEST (UTC+02:00)			Gervinho 35'; Somma 68', 83'; Totti 78', 81' (pen.)

15 August 2014 Friendly	Wiener Sport-Club (Austria)	1–4	(Italy) Roma	Vienna, Austria
18:00 CEST (UTC+02:00)	Günes 67'		Gervinho 35'; Pjanić 62'; Iturbe 83' (pen.); Ljajić 88'

19 August 2014 Friendly	Roma (Italy)	3–3	(Turkey) Fenerbahçe	Rome, Italy
CEST (UTC+02:00)	Totti 26' (pen.); Destro 82', 86'	Report	Alves 32'; Kuyt 51' (pen.); Sow 58'	Stadium: Stadio Olimpico; Referee: Paolo Valeri (Italy)

23 August 2014 Friendly	AEK Athens (Greece)	1–2	(Italy) Roma	Athens, Greece
CEST (UTC+02:00)	D'Acol 85'		Iturbe 48'; Keita 52'	Stadium: Olympic Stadium; Referee: Andreas Pappas (Greece)

=== International Champions Cup ===
26 July 2014 ICC	Manchester United (England)	3–2	(Italy) Roma	Denver, Colorado, United States
14:10 (MDT) (UTC−06:00)	Rooney 36', 45+1' (pen.); Mata 39'	Report	Pjanić 75'; Totti 89' (pen.)	Stadium: Sports Authority Field; Attendance: 54,116; Referee: Allen Chapman (United States)

29 July 2014 ICC	Real Madrid (Spain)	0–1	(Italy) Roma	Dallas, Texas, United States
20:15 (CDT) (UTC−05:00)		Report	Totti 58'	Stadium: Cotton Bowl; Attendance: 57,512; Referee: Drew Fischer (Canada)

2 August 2014 ICC	Internazionale (Italy)	2–0	(Italy) Roma	Philadelphia, Pennsylvania, United States
13:00 EDT (UTC−04:00)	Vidić 45'; Nagatomo 69'	Report		Stadium: Lincoln Financial Field; Attendance: 12,169

== Competitions ==
=== Overall ===
Competition	Started round	Final position	First match	Last match
Serie A	Matchday 1	Runners-up	30 August 2014	31 May 2015
Coppa Italia	Round of 16	Quarter-finals	20 January 2015	3 February 2015
Champions League	Group stage	Group stage	17 September 2014	10 December 2014
Europa League	Round of 32	Round of 16	19 February 2015	19 March 2015

Last updated: 31 May 2015

=== Serie A ===
==== League table ====
Pos	Team	Pld	W	D	L	GF	GA	GD	Pts	Qualification or relegation
1	Juventus (C)	38	26	9	3	72	24	+48	87	Qualification for the Champions League group stage
2	Roma	38	19	13	6	54	31	+23	70	Qualification for the Champions League group stage
3	Lazio	38	21	6	11	71	38	+33	69	Qualification for the Champions League play-off round
4	Fiorentina	38	18	10	10	61	46	+15	64	Qualification for the Europa League group stage (Note: Since the winners of the 2014–15 Coppa Italia (Juventus) qualified for European competition based on league position, the spot awarded to the cup winners (Europa League group stage) was passed to the fifth-placed team and the spot originally meant for the fifth-placed team (Europa League third qualifying round) was given to the highest placed team that has obtained an UEFA licence and not already qualified for European competition.)
5	Napoli	38	18	9	11	70	54	+16	63	Qualification for the Europa League group stage

Source: 2014–15 Serie A, 2014-15 Serie A classification.
Rules for classification: 1) points; 2) head-to-head points; 3) head-to-head goal difference; 4) goal difference; 5) number of goals scored; 6) draw. (Head-to-head record is applied for clubs with the same number of points only once all matches between said clubs have been played.).
(C) Champions

==== Results summary ====
Overall								Home						Away					
Pld	W	D	L	GF	GA	GD	Pts	W	D	L	GF	GA	GD	W	D	L	GF	GA	GD
38	19	13	6	54	31	+23	70	10	7	2	31	14	+17	9	6	4	23	17	+6

Last updated: 31 May 2015.
Source: Competitive matches

==== Results by round ====
Round	1	2	3	4	5	6	7	8	9	10	11	12	13	14	15	16	17	18	19	20	21	22	23	24	25	26	27	28	29	30	31	32	33	34	35	36	37	38
Ground	H	A	H	A	H	A	H	A	H	A	H	A	H	H	A	H	A	H	A	A	H	A	H	A	H	A	H	A	H	A	H	A	A	H	A	H	A	H
Result	W	W	W	W	W	L	W	D	W	L	W	W	W	D	W	D	W	D	D	D	D	W	D	D	D	D	L	W	W	D	D	L	W	W	L	W	W	L
Position	2	3	1	2	2	2	2	2	2	2	2	2	2	2	2	2	2	2	2	2	2	2	2	2	2	2	2	2	2	3	3	3	3	2	2	2	2	2

Updated to match(es) played on 31 May 2015. Source: Competitive matches
A = Away; H = Home; W = Win; D = Draw; L = Loss

==== Matches ====
30 August 2014 1	Roma	2–0	Fiorentina	Rome
20:45 CEST (UTC+02:00)	Totti (yellow card) 24'; Nainggolan 28'; Astori (yellow card) 57'; Torosidis (yellow card) 72'; Cole (yellow card) 88'; Gervinho 90+3'	Report	Savić (yellow card) 23'; Gonzalo (yellow card) 24'; Alonso (yellow card) 54'; Aquilani (yellow card) 90+1'	Stadium: Stadio Olimpico; Attendance: 44,353; Referee: Marco Guida

13 September 2014 2	Empoli	0–1	Roma	Empoli
18:00 CEST (UTC+02:00)		Report	Sepe 45+1' (o.g.); De Rossi (yellow card) 67'	Stadium: Stadio Carlo Castellani; Attendance: 11,118; Referee: Andrea Gervasoni

21 September 2014 3	Roma	2–0	Cagliari	Rome
15:00 CEST (UTC+02:00)	Destro 10'; Florenzi 13', (yellow card) 14'	Report	Rossettini (yellow card) 60'	Stadium: Stadio Olimpico; Attendance: 40,977; Referee: Sebastiano Peruzzo

24 September 2014 4	Parma	1–2	Roma	Parma
20:45 CEST (UTC+02:00)	Acquah (yellow card) 38'; De Ceglie 56'; Lodi (yellow card) 72'; Mirante (yellow card) 89'	Report	Ljajić 27'; Totti (yellow card) 42'; Torosidis (yellow card) 49'; Manolas (yellow card) 69'; Pjanić 88'	Stadium: Stadio Ennio Tardini; Attendance: 12,657; Referee: Paolo Mazzoleni

27 September 2014 5	Roma	2–0	Hellas Verona	Rome
18:00 CEST (UTC+02:00)	Manolas (yellow card) 45'; Florenzi 75'; Destro 86'	Report	Nenê (yellow card) 38'	Stadium: Stadio Olimpico; Attendance: 40,432; Referee: Carmine Russo

5 October 2014 6	Juventus	3–2	Roma	Turin
18:00 CEST (UTC+02:00)	Tevez 27' (pen.), 45+3' (pen.), (yellow card) 90+3'; Chiellini (yellow card) 30'; Lichtsteiner (yellow card) 31'; Bonucci (yellow card) 32', (goal) 86'; Morata (red card) 89'	Report	Maicon (yellow card) 26'; Totti 32' (pen.), (yellow card) 32'; Gervinho (yellow card) 40'; Iturbe 44'; Manolas (red card) 89'	Stadium: Juventus Stadium; Attendance: 39,102; Referee: Gianluca Rocchi

18 October 2014 7	Roma	3–0	Chievo	Rome
18:00 CEST (UTC+02:00)	Destro 4'; Ljajić 25'; Totti 33' (pen.); Pjanić (yellow card) 57'	Report	López (yellow card) 58'	Stadium: Stadio Olimpico; Attendance: 41,522; Referee: Gianpaolo Calvarese

25 October 2014 8	Sampdoria	0–0	Roma	Genoa
20:45 CEST (UTC+02:00)	Soriano (yellow card) 36'; Palombo (yellow card) 90'	Report	De Rossi (yellow card) 28'; Astori (yellow card) 59'; Holebas (yellow card) 69'	Stadium: Stadio Luigi Ferraris; Attendance: 23,548; Referee: Nicola Rizzoli

29 October 2014 9	Roma	2–0	Cesena	Rome
20:45 CET (UTC+01:00)	Destro 9', (yellow card) 75'; De Rossi 81'	Report		Stadium: Stadio Olimpico; Attendance: 34,044; Referee: Dino Tommasi

1 November 2014 10	Napoli	2–0	Roma	Naples
15:00 CET (UTC+01:00)	Higuaín 3'; Maggio (yellow card) 40'; López (yellow card) 68'; Callejón 85'	Report	Holebas (yellow card) 26'; Florenzi (yellow card) 42'; Nainggolan (yellow card) 73'	Stadium: Stadio San Paolo; Attendance: 30,157; Referee: Paolo Tagliavento

9 November 2014 11	Roma	3–0	Torino	Rome
20:45 CET (UTC+01:00)	Torosidis 8'; Totti (yellow card) 10'; Keita 27'; Ljajić 58'	Report	Quagliarella (yellow card) 22'; Gazzi (yellow card) 58'	Stadium: Stadio Olimpico; Attendance: 35,770; Referee: Luca Banti

22 November 2014 12	Atalanta	1–2	Roma	Bergamo
18:00 CET (UTC+01:00)	Moralez 1', (yellow card) 19'; Carmona (yellow card) 14'; Boakye (yellow card) 90+5' (red card) 90+5'	Report	Nainggolan (yellow card) 3', (goal) 42'; Ljajić 23'; Pjanić (yellow card) 50'; Astori (yellow card) 63'; Somma (yellow card) 80'; Keita (yellow card) 86'	Stadium: Stadio Atleti Azzurri d'Italia; Attendance: 17,286; Referee: Davide Massa

30 November 2014 13	Roma	4–2	Internazionale	Rome
20:45 CET (UTC+01:00)	Gervinho 21'; Keita (yellow card) 45'; Holebas 46'; Pjanić 60', 90+2'	Report	Ranocchia (yellow card) 16', (goal) 36'; M'Vila (yellow card) 49'; Palacio (yellow card) 56'; Osvaldo 57'; Guarín (yellow card) 90+1'	Stadium: Stadio Olimpico; Attendance: 41,701; Referee: Paolo Mazzoleni

6 December 2014 14	Roma	2–2	Sassuolo	Rome
18:00 CET (UTC+01:00)	Pjanić (yellow card) 26'; De Rossi (yellow card) 34' (yellow-red card) 50'; Nainggolan (yellow card) 61'; Ljajić 78' (pen.), 90+3'	Report	Zaza 15', 18'; Berardi (yellow card) 64'; Vrsaljko (yellow card) 77' (yellow-red card) 90+4'; Peluso (yellow card) 86'	Stadium: Stadio Olimpico; Attendance: 38,787; Referee: Massimiliano Irrati

14 December 2014 15	Genoa	0–1	Roma	Genoa
15:00 CET (UTC+01:00)	Perin (red card) 29'; Pinilla (yellow card) 80'; Perotti (yellow card) 84'	Report	Astori (yellow card) 25'; Yanga-Mbiwa (yellow card) 28'; Nainggolan 40'; Pjanić (yellow card) 90+1'	Stadium: Stadio Luigi Ferraris; Attendance: 20,055; Referee: Luca Banti

20 December 2014 16	Roma	0–0	Milan	Rome
20:45 CET (UTC+01:00)	Maicon (yellow card) 60'; Florenzi (yellow card) 64'; De Rossi (yellow card) 74'; Destro (yellow card) 86'	Report	Armero (yellow card) 39' (yellow-red card) 70'; De Jong (yellow card) 68'; Mexès (yellow card) 86'	Stadium: Stadio Olimpico; Attendance: 46,620; Referee: Nicola Rizzoli

6 January 2015 17	Udinese	0–1	Roma	Udine
12:30 CET (UTC+01:00)	Di Natale (yellow card) 21'	Report	Astori 17', (yellow card) 72'; Maicon (yellow card) 45+1'; Pjanić (yellow card) 52'; Torosidis (yellow card) 89'; Emanuelson (yellow card) 90'	Stadium: Stadio Friuli; Attendance: 10,870; Referee: Marco Guida

11 January 2015 18	Roma	2–2	Lazio	Rome
15:00 CET (UTC+01:00)	Iturbe (yellow card) 32'; Nainggolan (yellow card) 39'; Totti 48', 64'; Pjanić (yellow card) 58'; De Rossi (yellow card) 72'	Report	Felipe Anderson (yellow card) 16', (goal) 29'; Mauri 25', (yellow card) 32'; Cana (yellow card) 31'; Marchetti (yellow card) 51'	Stadium: Stadio Olimpico; Attendance: 51,252; Referee: Daniele Orsato

17 January 2015 19	Palermo	1–1	Roma	Palermo
20:45 CET (UTC+01:00)	Dybala 2'; Morganella (yellow card) 45+1'; Lazaar (yellow card) 63'	Report	Yanga-Mbiwa (yellow card) 12'; Destro 54', (yellow card) 90+3'; Strootman (yellow card) 89'	Stadium: Stadio Renzo Barbera; Attendance: 15,397; Referee: Antonio Damato

25 January 2015 20	Fiorentina	1–1	Roma	Florence
20:45 CET (UTC+01:00)	Gómez 19'; Pizarro (yellow card) 57'; Cuadrado (yellow card) 90+1'	Report	Holebas (yellow card) 23'; Yanga-Mbiwa (yellow card) 25'; Ljajić 49'	Stadium: Stadio Artemio Franchi; Attendance: 28,899; Referee: Luca Banti

31 January 2015 21	Roma	1–1	Empoli	Rome
20:45 CET (UTC+01:00)	Manolas (red card) 38'; Maicon 57'; Florenzi (yellow card) 58'; Astori (yellow card) 90+1'; Nainggolan (yellow card) 90+4'	Report	Maccarone 39' (pen.); Saponara (yellow card) 43' (yellow-red card) 45+3'; Croce (yellow card) 50'; Valdifiori (yellow card) 71'	Stadium: Stadio Olimpico; Attendance: 33,621; Referee: Carmine Russo

8 February 2015 22	Cagliari	1–2	Roma	Cagliari
15:00 CET (UTC+01:00)	Rossettini (yellow card) 35'; M'Poku (yellow card) 82', (goal) 90+5'	Report	Ljajić 37', (yellow card) 42'; Holebas (yellow card) 79'; Paredes (yellow card) 81', (goal) 85'	Stadium: Stadio Sant'Elia; Attendance: 9,961; Referee: Paolo Tagliavento

15 February 2015 23	Roma	0–0	Parma	Rome
15:00 CET (UTC+01:00)		Report	Lucarelli (yellow card) 36'; Mauri (yellow card) 50'; Costa (yellow card) 75'; Mariga (yellow card) 87'	Stadium: Stadio Olimpico; Attendance: 37,539; Referee: Piero Giacomelli

22 February 2015 24	Hellas Verona	1–1	Roma	Verona
15:00 CET (UTC+01:00)	Janković (yellow card) 2', (goal) 38'; Juanito (yellow card) 68'	Report	Totti 26'; Cole (yellow card) 68'; Manolas (yellow card) 86'; Nainggolan (yellow card) 87'	Stadium: Stadio Marc'Antonio Bentegodi; Attendance: 17,953; Referee: Andrea Gervasoni

2 March 2015 25	Roma	1–1	Juventus	Rome
20:45 CET (UTC+01:00)	Torosidis (yellow card) 19' (yellow-red card) 62'; De Rossi (yellow card) 32'; Pjanić (yellow card) 57'; Yanga-Mbiwa (yellow card) 60'; Keita 78'; Nainggolan (yellow card) 79'	Report	Evra (yellow card) 41'; Morata (yellow card) 54'; Tevez 64'; Marchisio (yellow card) 71'; Chiellini (yellow card) 77'; Vidal (yellow card) 84'	Stadium: Stadio Olimpico; Attendance: 55,651; Referee: Daniele Orsato

8 March 2015 26	Chievo	0–0	Roma	Verona
15:00 CET (UTC+01:00)	Dainelli (yellow card) 37'; Cesar (yellow card) 52'; Hetemaj (yellow card) 78'; Birsa (yellow card) 89'	Report	Florenzi (yellow card) 39'; Nainggolan (yellow card) 40'	Stadium: Stadio Marc'Antonio Bentegodi; Attendance: 12,000; Referee: Paolo Mazzoleni

16 March 2015 27	Roma	0–2	Sampdoria	Rome
21:00 CET (UTC+01:00)	Astori (yellow card) 56'; Keita (yellow card) 81' (red card) 81'; Pjanić (yellow card) 86'	Report	Obiang (yellow card) 24'; Silvestre (yellow card) 39'; Palombo (yellow card) 51'; De Silvestri 60'; Muriel 78'	Stadium: Stadio Olimpico; Attendance: 33,250; Referee: Gianpaolo Calvarese

22 March 2015 28	Cesena	0–1	Roma	Cesena
20:45 CET (UTC+01:00)	Capelli (yellow card) 38'; Lucchini (yellow card) 49'; Mudingayi (yellow card) 89'	Report	Uçan (yellow card) 33'; De Rossi 41', (yellow card) 88'	Stadium: Stadio Dino Manuzzi; Attendance: 16,575; Referee: Antonio Damato

4 April 2015 29	Roma	1–0	Napoli	Rome
12:30 CEST (UTC+02:00)	De Rossi (yellow card) 11'; Holebas (yellow card) 21'; Pjanić 25'; Florenzi (yellow card) 55'; Torosidis (yellow card) 72'	Report	Albiol (yellow card) 32'	Stadium: Stadio Olimpico; Attendance: 34,425; Referee: Nicola Rizzoli

12 April 2015 30	Torino	1–1	Roma	Turin
15:00 CEST (UTC+02:00)	Vives (yellow card) 30'; Maksimović (yellow card) 47'; Moretti (yellow card) 56'; López 64'; El Kaddouri (yellow card) 72'; Gazzi (yellow card) 79'	Report	Iturbe (yellow card) 37'; De Rossi (yellow card) 56'; Florenzi 57' (pen.); Manolas (yellow card) 90+4'	Stadium: Stadio Olimpico di Torino; Attendance: 19,317; Referee: Massimiliano Irrati

19 April 2015 31	Roma	1–1	Atalanta	Rome
15:00 CEST (UTC+02:00)	Totti 3' (pen.); Paredes (yellow card) 48'; Astori (yellow card) 65'; Yanga-Mbiwa (yellow card) 67'; Florenzi (yellow card) 90'	Report	Denis 23' (pen.); Baselli (yellow card) 25'; Benalouane (yellow card) 41'; Dramé (yellow card) 63'; Migliaccio (yellow card) 72'; Stendardo (yellow card) 83'	Stadium: Stadio Olimpico; Attendance: 35,088; Referee: Andrea Gervasoni

25 April 2015 32	Internazionale	2–1	Roma	Milan
15:00 CEST (UTC+02:00)	Hernanes 15'; Palacio (yellow card) 20'; Brozović (yellow card) 54'; Juan Jesus (yellow card) 66'; Ranocchia (yellow card) 74'; Gnoukouri (yellow card) 77'; Icardi 88'; Handanović (yellow card) 90+5'	Report	Yanga-Mbiwa (yellow card) 21'; Nainggolan 63', (yellow card) 90+4'; De Rossi (yellow card) 86'; De Sanctis (yellow card) 90+2'	Stadium: San Siro; Attendance: 37,695; Referee: Daniele Orsato

29 April 2015 33	Sassuolo	0–3	Roma	Reggio Emilia
20:45 CEST (UTC+02:00)	Cannavaro (yellow card) 56'; Zaza (yellow card) 57'; Taïder (yellow card) 69'	Report	Doumbia 6'; Florenzi 27'; Ibarbo (yellow card) 32'; De Rossi (yellow card) 33'; Astori (yellow card) 42'; Pjanić 74'	Stadium: Mapei Stadium – Città del Tricolore; Attendance: 12,196; Referee: Paolo Mazzoleni

3 May 2015 34	Roma	2–0	Genoa	Rome
15:00 CEST (UTC+02:00)	Doumbia 35'; Manolas (yellow card) 51'; Torosidis (yellow card) 65'; De Rossi (yellow card) 90+1'; Florenzi 90+3'	Report	Rincón (yellow card) 32'; Laxalt (yellow card) 56'; Izzo (yellow card) 61'	Stadium: Stadio Olimpico; Attendance: 37,068; Referee: Antonio Damato

9 May 2015 35	Milan	2–1	Roma	Milan
15:00 CEST (UTC+02:00)	Van Ginkel 40'; Destro 59', (yellow card) 71'; Abate (yellow card) 89'; Mexès (yellow card) 90+1'	Report	Torosidis (yellow card) 44'; Florenzi (yellow card) 60'; Pjanić (yellow card) 64'; Totti 73' (pen.)	Stadium: San Siro; Attendance: 35,614; Referee: Paolo Tagliavento

17 May 2015 36	Roma	2–1	Udinese	Rome
15:00 CEST (UTC+02:00)	Nainggolan 45', (yellow card) 80'; Torosidis 65', (yellow card) 87'; Ljajić (yellow card) 90'	Report	Perica 19'; Piris (yellow card) 24'; Heurtaux (yellow card) 49'	Stadium: Stadio Olimpico; Attendance: 35,720; Referee: Luca Banti

24 May 2015 37	Lazio	1–2	Roma	Rome
15:00 CEST (UTC+02:00)	Lulić (yellow card) 22'; Gentiletti (yellow card) 32'; Biglia (yellow card) 35'; Klose (yellow card) 62'; Đorđević 81'	Report	Totti (yellow card) 9'; Torosidis (yellow card) 52'; Iturbe 73', (yellow card) 75'; Yanga-Mbiwa 85'; Florenzi (yellow card) 86'	Stadium: Stadio Olimpico; Attendance: 49,385; Referee: Nicola Rizzoli

31 May 2015 38	Roma	1–2	Palermo	Rome
20:45 CEST (UTC+02:00)	Astori (yellow card) 56'; Totti 85'; Iturbe (yellow card) 90'	Report	Vázquez 35' (pen.); Jajalo (yellow card) 68'; Terzi (yellow card) 76'; Belotti (yellow card) 77', (goal) 90+4'	Stadium: Stadio Olimpico; Attendance: 44,752; Referee: Luigi Nasca

=== Coppa Italia ===
20 January 2015 Round of 16	Roma	2–1 (a.e.t.)	Empoli	Rome
21:00 CET (UTC+01:00)	Iturbe 5'; Yanga-Mbiwa (yellow card) 99'; De Rossi 114' (pen.)		Bianchetti (yellow card) 55'; Verdi 80'; Vecino (yellow card) 113'; Zieliński (yellow card) 113'; Laxalt (yellow card) 120+1'	Stadium: Stadio Olimpico; Attendance: 11,019; Referee: Marco Di Bello

3 February 2015 Quarter-finals	Roma	0–2	Fiorentina	Rome
20:45 CET (UTC+01:00)	Nainggolan (yellow card) 47'; Astori (yellow card) 84'		Badelj (yellow card) 35'; Valero (yellow card) 64'; Gómez 65', 89'	Stadium: Stadio Olimpico; Attendance: 24,315; Referee: Antonio Damato

=== UEFA Champions League ===
==== Group stage ====
Pos	Team	Pld	W	D	L	GF	GA	GD	Pts	Qualification	BAY	MCI	ROM	CSKA
1	(Germany) Bayern Munich	6	5	0	1	16	4	+12	15	Advance to knockout phase	—	1–0	2–0	3–0
2	(England) Manchester City	6	2	2	2	9	8	+1	8	Advance to knockout phase	3–2	—	1–1	1–2
3	(Italy) Roma	6	1	2	3	8	14	−6	5	Transfer to Europa League	1–7	0–2	—	5–1
4	(Russia) CSKA Moscow	6	1	2	3	6	13	−7	5		0–1	2–2	1–1	—

Source: UEFA
Rules for classification: Group stage tiebreakers

17 September 2014 1	Roma (Italy)	5–1	(Russia) CSKA Moscow	Rome, Italy
20:45 CEST (UTC+02:00)	Iturbe 6'; Gervinho 10', 31'; Maicon 20', (yellow card) 71'; Ignashevich 50' (o.g.)	Report	Musa 82'	Stadium: Stadio Olimpico; Attendance: 40,888; Referee: David Fernández Borbalán (Spain)

30 September 2014 2	Manchester City (England)	1–1	(Italy) Roma	Manchester, England
20:45 CEST (UTC+02:00)	Agüero 4' (pen.); Zabaleta (yellow card) 55'	Report	Maicon (yellow card) 4'; Totti 23'; Nainggolan (yellow card) 81'	Stadium: City of Manchester Stadium; Attendance: 37,509; Referee: Björn Kuipers (Netherlands)

21 October 2014 3	Roma (Italy)	1–7	(Germany) Bayern Munich	Rome, Italy
20:45 CEST (UTC+02:00)	Iturbe (yellow card) 29'; Torosidis (yellow card) 56'; Nainggolan (yellow card) 57'; Gervinho 66'	Report	Robben 9', 30'; Götze 23'; Lewandowski 25'; Müller 36' (pen.); Bernat (yellow card) 63'; Ribéry 78'; Shaqiri 80'	Stadium: Stadio Olimpico; Attendance: 70,544; Referee: Jonas Eriksson (Sweden)

5 November 2014 4	Bayern Munich (Germany)	2–0	(Italy) Roma	Munich, Germany
20:45 CET (UTC+01:00)	Ribéry 38'; Alonso (yellow card) 45+1'; Götze 64'	Report		Stadium: Allianz Arena; Attendance: 68,000; Referee: Cüneyt Çakır (Turkey)

25 November 2014 5	CSKA Moscow (Russia)	1–1	(Italy) Roma	Khimki, Russia
18:00 CET (UTC+01:00)	Dzagoev (yellow card) 38'; Berezutski (yellow card) 42', (goal) 90+3'; Schennikov (yellow card) 84'	Report	Totti 43'	Stadium: Arena Khimki; Attendance: 0 Referee: Felix Brych (Germany)

10 December 2014 6	Roma (Italy)	0–2	(England) Manchester City	Rome, Italy
20:45 CET (UTC+01:00)	Yanga-Mbiwa (yellow card) 43'	Report	Džeko (yellow card) 43'; Nasri 60', (yellow card) 74'; Zabaleta 86'	Stadium: Stadio Olimpico; Attendance: 54,119; Referee: Milorad Mažić (Serbia)

=== UEFA Europa League ===
==== Knockout phase ====
===== Round of 32 =====
19 February 2015 First leg	Roma (Italy)	1–1	(Netherlands) Feyenoord	Rome, Italy
19:00 CET (UTC+01:00)	Gervinho 22'; Holebas (yellow card) 72'; Keita (yellow card) 72'; Yanga-Mbiwa (yellow card) 86'	Report	Wilkshire (yellow card) 17'; Kazim-Richards 55'; Immers (yellow card) 56'; Clasie (yellow card) 82'	Stadium: Stadio Olimpico; Attendance: 29,292; Referee: Ovidiu Hațegan (Romania)

26 February 2015 Second leg	Feyenoord (Netherlands)	1–2 (2–3 agg.)	(Italy) Roma	Rotterdam, Netherlands
21:05 CET (UTC+01:00)	Boulahrouz (yellow card) 17'; Clasie (yellow card) 41'; Te Vrede (red card) 54'; Manu 57'; Mulder (red card) 57'	Report	Torosidis (yellow card) 31'; Ljajić 45+2'; Pjanić (yellow card) 45+3'; Gervinho 60'; Paredes (yellow card) 88'	Stadium: De Kuip; Attendance: 45,000; Referee: Clément Turpin (France)
Note: Erwin Mulder was sent off while a substitute.

===== Round of 16 =====
12 March 2015 First leg	Fiorentina (Italy)	1–1	(Italy) Roma	Florence, Italy
21:05 CET (UTC+01:00)	Iličić 17', (yellow card) 45+1'; Pizarro (yellow card) 31'; Alonso (yellow card) 33'; Neto (yellow card) 59'; Badelj (yellow card) 67'	Report	Nainggolan (yellow card) 30'; Keita 77'	Stadium: Stadio Artemio Franchi; Attendance: 23,357; Referee: Antonio Mateu Lahoz (Spain)

19 March 2015 Second leg	Roma (Italy)	0–3 (1–4 agg.)	(Italy) Fiorentina	Rome, Italy
19:00 CET (UTC+01:00)	Ljajić (yellow card) 78' (yellow-red card) 88'	Report	Basanta (yellow card) 9', (goal) 22'; Gonzalo 10' (pen.); Alonso 18'	Stadium: Stadio Olimpico; Attendance: 30,591; Referee: Cüneyt Çakır (Turkey)

== Statistics ==
=== Appearances and goals ===
No.	Pos	Nat	Player	Total		Serie A		Coppa Italia		Champions League		Europa League	
No.	Pos	Nat	Player	Apps	Goals	Apps	Goals	Apps	Goals	Apps	Goals	Apps	Goals
Goalkeepers
1	GK	(Romania) ROU	Bogdan Lobonț	0	0	0	0	0	0	0	0	0	0
26	GK	(Italy) ITA	Morgan De Sanctis	39	0	35	0	0	0	4	0	0	0
28	GK	(Poland) POL	Łukasz Skorupski	11	0	3	0	2	0	2	0	4	0
Defenders
2	DF	(France) FRA	Mapou Yanga-Mbiwa	38	1	22+6	1	1	0	4+1	0	4	0
3	DF	(England) ENG	Ashley Cole	16	0	11	0	2	0	2+1	0	0	0
5	DF	(Brazil) BRA	Leandro Castán	1	0	1	0	0	0	0	0	0	0
13	DF	(Brazil) BRA	Maicon	19	2	11+3	1	2	0	3	1	0	0
23	DF	(Italy) ITA	Davide Astori	30	1	22+2	1	2	0	2	0	0+2	0
25	DF	(Greece) GRE	José Holebas	34	1	23+1	1	0+1	0	3+2	0	4	0
33	DF	(Argentina) ARG	Nicolás Spolli	1	0	1	0	0	0	0	0	0	0
35	DF	(Greece) GRE	Vasilis Torosidis	28	2	17+3	2	0	0	3+1	0	4	0
42	DF	(Italy) ITA	Federico Balzaretti	1	0	1	0	0	0	0	0	0	0
44	DF	(Greece) GRE	Kostas Manolas	41	0	30	0	1	0	6	0	4	0
Midfielders
4	MF	(Belgium) BEL	Radja Nainggolan	46	5	30+5	5	2	0	6	0	2+1	0
6	MF	(Netherlands) NED	Kevin Strootman	7	0	4+2	0	0	0	0+1	0	0	0
15	MF	(Bosnia and Herzegovina) BIH	Miralem Pjanić	46	5	28+6	5	1+1	0	4+2	0	3+1	0
16	MF	(Italy) ITA	Daniele De Rossi	34	3	25+1	2	1	1	3	0	4	0
20	MF	(Mali) MLI	Seydou Keita	35	3	17+8	2	1	0	5	0	3+1	1
24	MF	(Italy) ITA	Alessandro Florenzi	45	5	24+11	5	1	0	3+3	0	2+1	0
32	MF	(Argentina) ARG	Leandro Paredes	13	1	4+6	1	1+1	0	0	0	0+1	0
48	MF	(Turkey) TUR	Salih Uçan	4	0	2+2	0	0	0	0	0	0	0
52	MF	(Italy) ITA	Lorenzo Pellegrini	1	0	0+1	0	0	0	0	0	0	0
Forwards
7	FW	(Argentina) ARG	Juan Iturbe	37	4	17+10	2	1	1	3+3	1	1+2	0
8	FW	(Serbia) SRB	Adem Ljajić	41	9	23+9	8	1+1	0	2+2	0	3	1
10	FW	(Italy) ITA	Francesco Totti	36	10	24+3	8	2	0	5	2	2	0
19	FW	(Colombia) COL	Víctor Ibarbo	11	0	6+4	0	0+1	0	0	0	0	0
27	FW	(Ivory Coast) CIV	Gervinho	34	7	21+3	2	0	0	5+1	3	3+1	2
53	FW	(Italy) ITA	Daniele Verde	10	0	1+6	0	0+1	0	0	0	1+1	0
88	FW	(Ivory Coast) CIV	Seydou Doumbia	14	2	6+7	2	0	0	0	0	0+1	0
96	FW	(Paraguay) PAR	Antonio Sanabria	2	0	0+2	0	0	0	0	0	0	0
Players transferred out during the season
9	FW	(Italy) ITA	Marco Borriello	0	0	0	0	0	0	0	0	0	0
22	FW	(Italy) ITA	Mattia Destro	19	5	8+8	5	1	0	1+1	0	0	0
50	DF	(Italy) ITA	Michele Somma	1	0	0+1	0	0	0	0	0	0	0
82	DF	(Netherlands) NED	Urby Emanuelson	2	0	0+2	0	0	0	0	0	0	0

Last updated: 31 May 2015
Source: Competitions

=== Goalscorers ===
Rank	No.	Pos	Nat	Name	Serie A	Coppa Italia	UEFA CL	UEFA EL	Total
1	10	FW	(Italy)	Francesco Totti	8	0	2	0	10
2	8	FW	(Serbia)	Adem Ljajić	8	0	0	1	9
3	27	FW	(Ivory Coast)	Gervinho	2	0	3	2	7
4	4	MF	(Belgium)	Radja Nainggolan	5	0	0	0	5
4	15	MF	(Bosnia and Herzegovina)	Miralem Pjanić	5	0	0	0	5
4	24	MF	(Italy)	Alessandro Florenzi	5	0	0	0	5
7	7	FW	(Argentina)	Juan Iturbe	2	1	1	0	4
7	22	FW	(Italy)	Mattia Destro	4	0	0	0	4
9	16	MF	(Italy)	Daniele De Rossi	2	1	0	0	3
9	20	MF	(Mali)	Seydou Keita	2	0	0	1	3
11	35	DF	(Greece)	Vasilis Torosidis	2	0	0	0	2
11	88	FW	(Ivory Coast)	Seydou Doumbia	2	0	0	0	2
13	2	DF	(France)	Mapou Yanga-Mbiwa	1	0	0	0	1
13	13	DF	(Brazil)	Maicon	0	0	1	0	1
13	23	DF	(Italy)	Davide Astori	1	0	0	0	1
13	25	DF	(Greece)	José Holebas	1	0	0	0	1
13	32	MF	(Argentina)	Leandro Paredes	1	0	0	0	1
Own goal					1	0	1	0	2
Totals					54	2	8	4	68

Last updated: 31 May 2015

=== Clean sheets ===
Rank	No.	Pos	Nat	Name	Serie A	Coppa Italia	UEFA CL	UEFA EL	Total
1	26	GK	(Italy)	Morgan De Sanctis	16	0	0	0	16
2	28	GK	(Poland)	Łukasz Skorupski	1	0	0	0	1
Totals					17	0	0	0	17

Last updated: 31 May 2015

=== Disciplinary record ===
No.	Pos	Nat	Name	Serie A			Coppa Italia			UEFA CL			UEFA EL			Total		
No.	Pos	Nat	Name	Booked	(yellow card) (yellow-red card)	Sent off (straight red)	Booked	(yellow card) (yellow-red card)	Sent off (straight red)	Booked	(yellow card) (yellow-red card)	Sent off (straight red)	Booked	(yellow card) (yellow-red card)	Sent off (straight red)	Booked	(yellow card) (yellow-red card)	Sent off (straight red)
1	GK	(Romania)	Bogdan Lobonț	0	0	0	0	0	0	0	0	0	0	0	0	0	0	0
26	GK	(Italy)	Morgan De Sanctis	1	0	0	0	0	0	0	0	0	0	0	0	1	0	0
28	GK	(Poland)	Łukasz Skorupski	0	0	0	0	0	0	0	0	0	0	0	0	0	0	0
2	DF	(France)	Mapou Yanga-Mbiwa	6	0	0	1	0	0	1	0	0	1	0	0	9	0	0
3	DF	(England)	Ashley Cole	2	0	0	0	0	0	0	0	0	0	0	0	2	0	0
5	DF	(Brazil)	Leandro Castán	0	0	0	0	0	0	0	0	0	0	0	0	0	0	0
13	DF	(Brazil)	Maicon	3	0	0	0	0	0	2	0	0	0	0	0	5	0	0
23	DF	(Italy)	Davide Astori	10	0	0	1	0	0	0	0	0	0	0	0	11	0	0
25	DF	(Greece)	José Holebas	4	0	0	0	0	0	0	0	0	1	0	0	5	0	0
33	DF	(Argentina)	Nicolás Spolli	0	0	0	0	0	0	0	0	0	0	0	0	0	0	0
35	DF	(Greece)	Vasilis Torosidis	8	1	0	0	0	0	1	0	0	1	0	0	10	1	0
42	DF	(Italy)	Federico Balzaretti	0	0	0	0	0	0	0	0	0	0	0	0	0	0	0
44	DF	(Greece)	Kostas Manolas	5	0	2	0	0	0	0	0	0	0	0	0	5	0	2
50	DF	(Italy)	Michele Somma	1	0	0	0	0	0	0	0	0	0	0	0	1	0	0
82	DF	(Netherlands)	Urby Emanuelson	1	0	0	0	0	0	0	0	0	0	0	0	1	0	0
4	MF	(Belgium)	Radja Nainggolan	10	0	0	1	0	0	2	0	0	1	0	0	14	0	0
6	MF	(Netherlands)	Kevin Strootman	1	0	0	0	0	0	0	0	0	0	0	0	1	0	0
15	MF	(Bosnia and Herzegovina)	Miralem Pjanić	9	0	0	0	0	0	0	0	0	1	0	0	10	0	0
16	MF	(Italy)	Daniele De Rossi	11	1	0	0	0	0	0	0	0	0	0	0	11	1	0
20	MF	(Mali)	Seydou Keita	2	0	1	0	0	0	0	0	0	1	0	0	3	0	1
24	MF	(Italy)	Alessandro Florenzi	9	0	0	0	0	0	0	0	0	0	0	0	9	0	0
32	MF	(Argentina)	Leandro Paredes	2	0	0	0	0	0	0	0	0	1	0	0	3	0	0
48	MF	(Turkey)	Salih Uçan	1	0	0	0	0	0	0	0	0	0	0	0	1	0	0
52	MF	(Italy)	Lorenzo Pellegrini	0	0	0	0	0	0	0	0	0	0	0	0	0	0	0
7	FW	(Argentina)	Juan Iturbe	4	0	0	0	0	0	1	0	0	0	0	0	5	0	0
8	FW	(Serbia)	Adem Ljajić	2	0	0	0	0	0	0	0	0	0	1	0	2	1	0
9	FW	(Italy)	Marco Borriello	0	0	0	0	0	0	0	0	0	0	0	0	0	0	0
10	FW	(Italy)	Francesco Totti	5	0	0	0	0	0	0	0	0	0	0	0	5	0	0
19	FW	(Colombia)	Víctor Ibarbo	1	0	0	0	0	0	0	0	0	0	0	0	1	0	0
22	FW	(Italy)	Mattia Destro	3	0	0	0	0	0	0	0	0	0	0	0	3	0	0
27	FW	(Ivory Coast)	Gervinho	1	0	0	0	0	0	0	0	0	0	0	0	1	0	0
53	FW	(Italy)	Daniele Verde	0	0	0	0	0	0	0	0	0	0	0	0	0	0	0
88	FW	(Ivory Coast)	Seydou Doumbia	0	0	0	0	0	0	0	0	0	0	0	0	0	0	0
96	FW	(Paraguay)	Antonio Sanabria	0	0	0	0	0	0	0	0	0	0	0	0	0	0	0
Totals				102	2	3	3	0	0	7	0	0	7	1	0	119	3	3

Last updated: 31 May 2015
