= Eduardo Montenegro =

Colombian footballer (born 1998)

Personal information
- Full name: Eduardo Antonio Montenegro Zúñiga
- Date of birth: 30 September 1998 (age 28)
- Place of birth: Barranquilla, Atlántico, Colombia
- Position: Midfielder

Team information
- Current team: Atlántico
- Number: 10

Youth career
- 2011–2013: Colombia Sport
- 2014–2016: Udinese Football School
- 2017: Watford
- 2017: → Granada (loan)

Senior career*
Years	Team	Apps	(Gls)
2017–2018	Watford	0	(0)
2017–2018	→ Real Valladolid B (loan)	7	(0)
2018	Envigado	2	(0)
2019	Real Cundinamarca	6	(1)
2023	Atlántico	25	(3)
2024	Moca	25	(0)
2025–	Atlántico	4	(0)
- * Club domestic league appearances and goals as of 18:44, 15 March 2025 (UTC)

Eduardo Antonio Montenegro Zúñiga (born 30 September 1998) is a Colombian footballer who currently plays as a midfielder for Atlántico.

== Club career ==
=== Early career and move to Europe ===
Born in Barranquilla in the Atlántico Department of Colombia, Montenegro initially played football at Colombia Sport, later admitting that he would not regularly attend training sessions. After encouragement from a friend, he tried out for the Parma Football School (since renamed as the Udinese Football School) at the age of fifteen, but was initially denied a place.

After receiving a phone call from the school, he was eventually offered a place, but would again struggle with regularly attending training. After a change in educational facility, his attendances improved, and his performances caught the eye of Italian club Udinese scout Rafael Monfort. Through Montfort, as well as the school's links to English Premier League side Watford via the Pozzo family, it was agreed in mid-2016 that Montenegro and teammate Jaime Alvarado would join The Hornets from January 2017.

He was initially loaned to Spanish side Granada, who were also owned by the Pozzo family at the time, immediately upon joining Watford, and remained there alongside fellow Colombians Alvarado and Juan Camilo Becerra until June 2017. The following month he joined fellow Spanish club Real Valladolid on loan, being assigned to the club's B team alongside Alvarado, Becerra and Luis Suárez.

=== Return to Colombia ===
After only a handful of appearances in the Segunda División B, Montenegro returned to Colombia, signing with Envigado in July 2018. After just two appearances for Envigado, he was declared transferrable by the club at the end of the 2018 season. He went on to join Real Cundinamarca for the 2019 season, but left the club in May of the same year.

=== Dominican Republic ===
After a three-year hiatus, Montenegro returned to football in 2023, moving to the Dominican Republic to join Liga Dominicana de Fútbol side Atlántico. He joined Moca the following season, before returning to Atlántico in 2025.

== Career statistics ==
=== Club ===
As of 15 March 2025.

Appearances and goals by club, season and competition
Club	Season	League			Cup		Continental		Other		Total	
Club	Season	Division	Apps	Goals	Apps	Goals	Apps	Goals	Apps	Goals	Apps	Goals
Watford	2017–18	Premier League	0	0	0	0	–		0	0	0	0
Real Valladolid B (loan)	2017–18	Segunda División B	7	0	–		–		0	0	7	0
Envigado	2018	Categoría Primera A	2	0	1 (Note: Appearances in the Copa Colombia)	0	–		0	0	3	0
Real Cundinamarca	2019	Categoría Primera B	6	1	3	0	–		0	0	9	1
Atlántico	2023	LDF	25	3	0	0	–		2 (Note: Appearances in the Liga Dominicana de Fútbol playoffs)	0	27	3
Moca	2024	LDF	25	0	0	0	10 (Note: Two appearances in the CONCACAF Champions Cup, eight appearances in the CONCACAF Caribbean Cup)	0	2	0	37	0
Atlántico	2025	LDF	4	0	0	0	–		0	0	4	0
Career total			69	4	4	0	10	0	4	0	87	4
