= Charles Brierley Garside =

English Roman Catholic priest

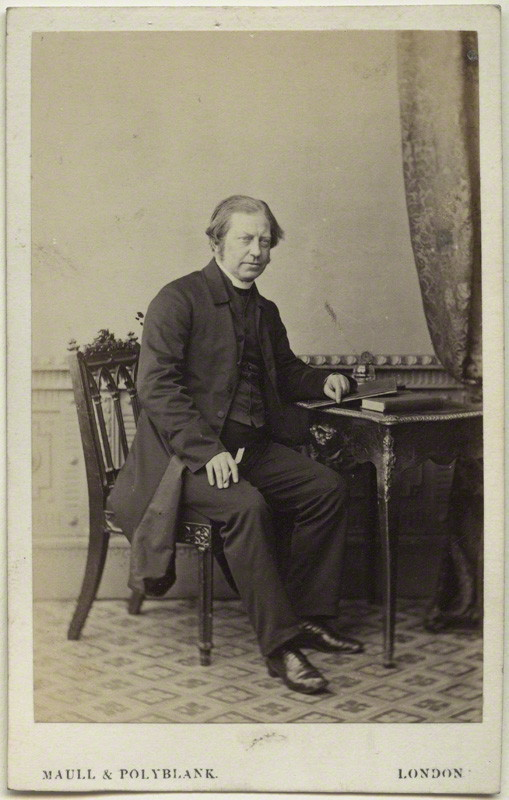
- Born: 6 April 1818; Manchester, England
- Died: 21 May 1876 (aged 58); Posillipo, Naples
- Occupation: Roman Catholic priest

Charles Brierley Garside (6 April 1818 – 21 May 1876) was an English Roman Catholic priest and author.

== Biography ==
Garside was born on 6 April 1818 at Manchester, was only son of Joseph Garside, surgeon and a distinguished ornithologist, by Mary Ann, daughter of Thomas Pearson. From the grammar school of his native city, where he obtained an exhibition in 1837, he was sent to Brasenose College, Oxford, in 1838. There he gained one of the Somerset scholarships, carried off the college prize for Latin and English essays in 1840, and became in the same year Hulme divinity exhibitioner. He graduated B.A. on 28 May 1841, taking a third class in literis humanioribus, and commenced M.A. on 27 June 1844. Having been ordained in 1842 by the Bishop of Gloucester, he became curate, first at Tetbury, Gloucestershire, next at Christ Church, Albany Street, Regent's Park, London, and afterwards, in 1847, at Margaret Street Chapel, Marylebone. At the time of the Gorham case he lost faith in the established Church of England. He was received into the Roman Catholic church, at St Leonards-on-Sea, on 15 August 1850 and was ordained priest at Rome by Cardinal Patrizi on 23 December 1854, having in the previous month of May graduated as Baccalaureus in Theologiâ in the Collegio Romano. He was appointed domestic chaplain to Bertram, the last catholic Earl of Shrewsbury, in April 1855, assistant priest at St. Mary's, Chelsea, in 1857, and at St. Aloysius's, Somers Town, in May 1861. He died at Posillipo, near Naples, on 21 May 1876.

== Works ==
- The Impiety of Bartering Faith for Opinion, London, 1850. This pamphlet on the Gorham case was written before the author left the church of England
- Discourses on some Parables of the New Testament, London, 1869
- The Preaching of the Cross. A brief discourse … introductory to the singing of sacred music illustrative of the Passion of Christ, London, 1869
- The Prophet of Carmel: a series of practical considerations on the History of Elias in the Old Testament, with a supplementary dissertation, London, 1873, dedicated to Dr. (now Cardinal) Newman
- The Helpers of the Holy Souls, who and what they are; with some account of the Life of their Foundress, Mother Mary of Providence, London, 1874
- Blessed Margaret Mary Alacocque; a brief account of her Life. To which are added, a selection from her sayings, and the decree of her beatification, London, 1874
- The Sacrifice of the Eucharist, and other Doctrines of the Catholic Church, explained and vindicated, London, 1875
