= The Midland Journal =

Newspaper published in Rising Sun, Maryland

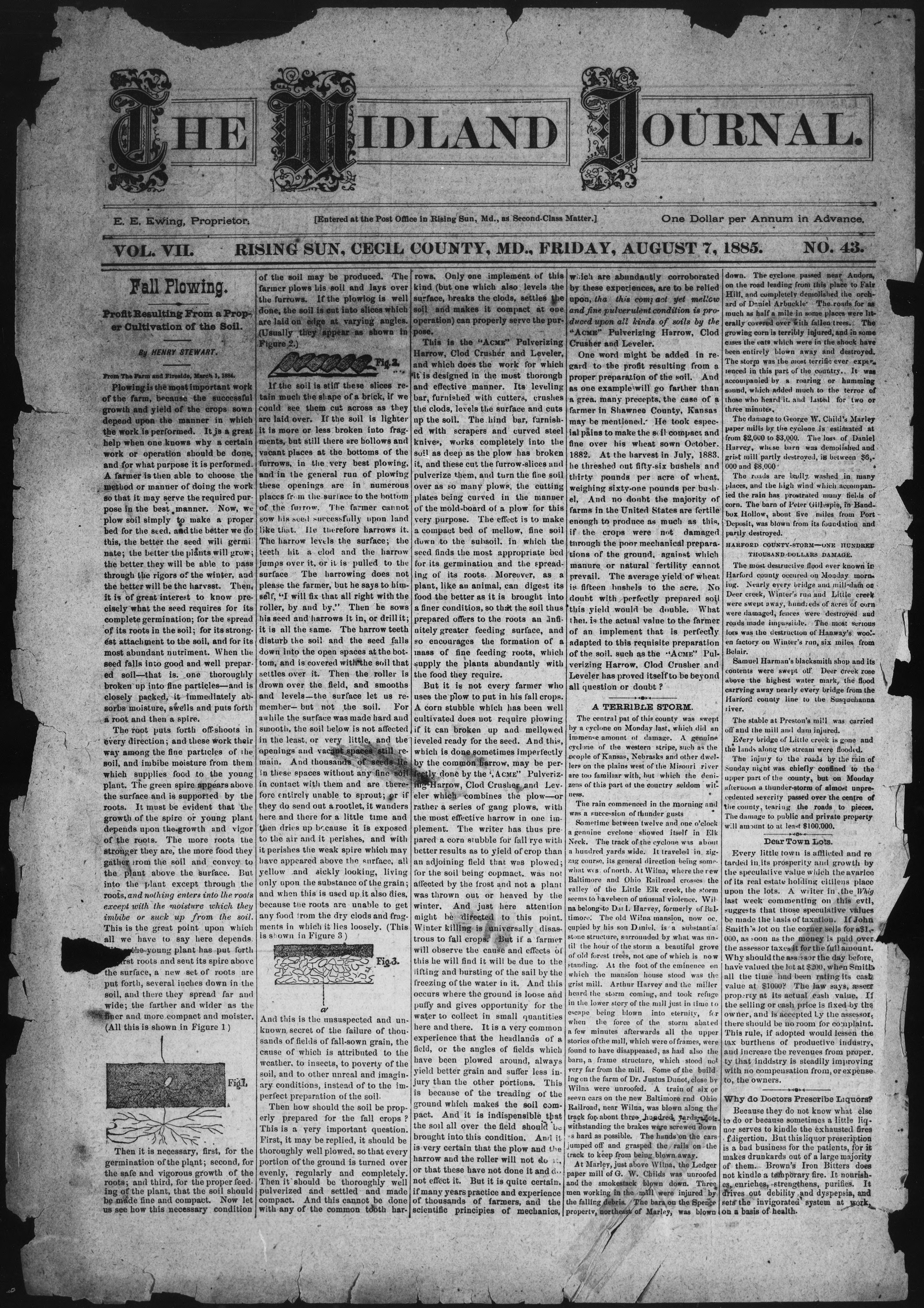
- The cover page of the August 7, 1885 issue of The Midland Journal
- Type: Weekly newspaper
- Founder: Edwin E. Ewing
- Publisher: Edwin E. Ewing
- Founded: August 7, 1885
- Ceased publication: June 27, 1947
- Headquarters: Rising Sun, Maryland
- OCLC number: 20395768

The Midland Journal was a weekly newspaper published in Rising Sun, Cecil County, Maryland from August 7, 1885 to June 27, 1947. It was founded when veteran newspaperman Edwin E. Ewing purchased the Rising Sun Journal from the firm of William H. Pennington & Brother and renamed it to The Midland Journal. Ewing had plenty of experience publishing newspapers, having previously established Topeka, Kansas' Daily Capital in 1877 as well as Macon County, North Carolina's Blue Ridge Enterprise in 1882. He had also owned and edited nearby Elkton, Maryland's Cecil Whig from 1861 to 1876, during which time he was a staunch supporter of the Union cause. He was also a novelist and poet, with his story "The Hag of the Wallowish" originally appearing as a serial in The Philadelphia Dollar Newspaper beginning in 1849. Ewing published the paper with the assistance of his three sons, Cecil, Evans, and Halus, until his death in 1901; after this, his sons took over ownership of the Journal. They continued to publish the paper until 1947, when they sold it to the owners of the Cecil Whig and it ceased publication as a separate title.

Like many small town publications, The Midland Journal functioned primarily as a source of local news, light reading, and brief notices of national and international events. During its early decades, discussion about temperance dominated the Journal's editorial pages, as well as documentation of the activities and meetings of the Women's Christian Temperance Union. Ewing continued the trend he started at the Whig of a fairly progressive editorial stance; in December 1885 the Journal announced a lecture at the local Episcopal church by celebrated abolitionist Frederick Douglass and noted that "his fame as an orator is world wide."

The offices of The Midland Journal were located in a building built in 1935 that still stands at 11 East Main Street.
