= Gartside v Sheffield =

- Court: Court of Appeal of New Zealand
- Full case name: Jack Gartside v Joseph Thomas Sheffield(1st Defendant), Arthur William Young(2nd Defendant), Peter David Ellis(3rd Defendant), Trevor Clendon Gould(4th Defendant), John Keith Radley (5th Defendant)
- Decided: 1 June 1983
- Citation: [1983] NZLR 37
- Transcript: Court of Appeal judgment

Court membership
- Judges sitting: Cooke P, Richardson J, McMullin J

Keywords
- negligence

Gartside v Sheffield [1983] NZLR 37 is a cited case in New Zealand regarding liability for negligence cases against lawyers.

== Background ==
Winnifred Herrold, aged 89, after suffering a fall and being admitted to a retirement home, on 2 October 1978 contacted her solicitor at the law firm of Sheffield, Young & Ellis (later to merge with Chapman Tripp) to draw up a new will to leave the bulk of her estate to Jack Gartside. The solicitor visited her at her resthome on 5 October and took her instructions to draw up the new will.

However, Herrold died on 12 October, without her solicitor getting her to sign the new will. This resulted in Gartside getting nothing from the estate, as the estate was given to her sister under a previous will. Gartside claimed the lawyers were negligent, whilst the lawyers said they did not owe a duty of care to a mere beneficiary. Gartside sued the five partners of the law firm, who were able to get his claim struck out by the High Court of New Zealand. He appealed.

== Held ==
The Court of Appeal of New Zealand reinstated his claim, saying they did owe a duty of care to a beneficiary.
