= Garside classification =

Library classification system

The Garside Classification Scheme is a library classification system used in most of the libraries of University College London (UCL). It was devised by Kenneth Garside while he was deputy librarian there. Intellectually, it was based on the close relationship between the library and the teaching departments. The library at UCL rejected the major published classification schemes because "none of them would generally acceptable to the teaching departments without such major modifications as would have destroyed its essential character." Instead, it was modelled around the "subject reading rooms" into which the collection had been divided. The intention was to use the expertise of the departments and their teaching needs in drawing up the divisions within the scheme.

== Main outline ==
The principles of the scheme are "To provide the optimum arrangement of books in each subject; to permit the revision of the classification to meet a changing academic approach to a subject without disturbing in any way other parts of the scheme; and to provide as simple a shelf mark as possible to help the reader find the book he wants with the minimum mental effort."

In his article "The Basic Principles of the New Library Classification at University College, London". Garside set out the generic structure of the system. The library would be divided into subject-based reading rooms such as, in the example below, a dedicated space for biology-related materials. These would then be subdivided according to the table below:

A	The subject generally
B–W	Main sections of the subject
X–Y	Subsidiary works studied in conjunction with the main topic
Z	Works not properly belonging to the subject but required to be shelved with it

The alphabetical subdivisions were designed in consultation with the teaching department. These subsections would then be divided by numbers:

1	Bibliographies
2	Reference works
3	Periodicals and series
4	Sources
5	Textbooks
6	Miscellanies
7	Monographs
8	History of the subject
9	Methodology
10 >	Special topics

The completed shelfmark would then include the first three letters of the author's surname.

=== Example ===
	Biology
A	Biological studies generally
B	Ecology and biogeography (including biological control)
C	Microbiology
D	Physiology and biophysics *
E	Biophysics *
F	Histology *
G	Cytology and cells *
H	Genetics, heredity, eugenics (genetic engineering)
J	Evolution
	* = Basic texts only, use Medical Sciences for all other texts

E.g. Basic Concepts in Population, Quantitative, and Evolutionary Genetics by James F. Crow is shelved at BIOLOGY H 5 CRO.

== Subject sequence ==
In order to provide for a single-subject card catalogue Garside added a further table to which the top reading room divisions could be mapped.

100	Scholarship generally
200	Philology (language/literature) generally
300	The Arts
400	History
500	Law
600	Social sciences
700	Geography
800	Science (generally)
900	Biological sciences

== Use ==
The scheme is used at UCL. An adapted version is used by the Folklore Society. Garside instituted a similar scheme during his time at the University of Leeds.
