= Kenneth Garside =

British librarian (1913–1983)

- Born: 1913; Bradford, UK
- Died: 1983 (aged 69–70); London, UK
- Known for: Library administration Garside classification

Academic background
- Education: University of Leeds

Lieutenant Colonel Kenneth Garside (1913 – 1983) was a librarian, information theorist and World War II British Intelligence Corps officer.

== Education and career ==
Born in Bradford in 1913, Garside was educated at Bradford Grammar School and the University of Leeds. He became an Assistant Librarian at the University of Leeds in 1937, before going to war in 1939. He was commissioned into the Intelligence Corps in 1941, and served in the Headquarters, 21 Army Group, in 1945, where he was instrumental in establishing The Intelligence Library of the Control Commission for Germany in Bad Oeynhausen (later moved to Herford).

After the war, he worked as deputy librarian at University College London, from 1945 to 1958; although he continued working with the British occupation in Germany, such as on the Enemy Publications (Requirements) Committee (EPCOM) - making German learned documents published during the war available to British academics. He became librarian at King's College London in 1958, and remained there until 1974. He ended his professional career as Goldsmiths' librarian and director of Central Library Services in the University of London between 1974 and 1978. He was on many public bodies connected with library, university and cultural work.

Garside devised the library classification systems still in use at Leeds University library and at UCL.

== Publications ==
Books, a selection:

- 1981. Library co-operation at a time of financial constraints / by Kenneth Garside London : LRCC,1981
- 1983. Guide to the library resources of the University of London / compiled by Kenneth Garside. [London] : University of London, Library Resources Co-ordinating Committee, 1983.
