= Nathan Gartside =

Northern Irish footballer (born 1998)

Personal information
- Date of birth: 8 March 1998 (age 28)
- Place of birth: Maydown, Northern Ireland
- Position: Goalkeeper

Team information
- Current team: Carrick Rangers

Youth career
- –2014: Institute
- 2014–2017: Watford

Senior career*
Years	Team	Apps	(Gls)
2018	Watford	0	(0)
2018	→ Chelmsford City (loan)	2	(0)
2018–2022	Derry City	41	(0)
2022–2024	Cliftonville	46	(0)
2024–2025	Loughgall	36	(0)
2025–	Carrick Rangers	10	(0)

International career
2014–2015	Northern Ireland U17	5	(0)
- Northern Ireland U19
2019	Northern Ireland U21	2	(0)
- * Club domestic league appearances and goals

Nathan Gartside (born 8 March 1998) is a Northern Irish footballer who plays as a goalkeeper for Carrick Rangers.

== Club career ==
As a youth player, Gartside joined the youth academy of Northern Irish side Institute. He joined the youth academy of English side Watford at the age of sixteen. In 2018, Gartside signed for Northern Irish side Derry City. In 2022, he signed for Northern Irish side Cliftonville. Ahead of the 2025–26 NIFL Premiership season, after a season at Loughgall, Gartside signed for Carrick Rangers.

== International career ==
Gartside has represented Northern Ireland at under-17, under-19 and under-21 level, winning two caps for the under-21's in 2019.

Gartside was first called up to the Northern Ireland national football team for 2022 FIFA World Cup qualification.

== Personal life ==
Gartside was born in 1998 in Northern Ireland. He is a native of Maydown, Northern Ireland.
