= 2013 Greek Football Cup final =

2013 Greek Cup final
- Event: 2012–13 Greek Football Cup
Asteras Tripolis	Olympiacos
1	3
- After extra time
- Date: 11 May 2013
- Venue: Olympic Stadium, Marousi, Athens
- Man of the Match: David Fuster (Olympiacos)
- Referee: Athanasios Giachos (Chios)
- Attendance: 28,980
- Weather: Fair; 19 °C (66 °F); 64% humidity

The 2013 Greek Cup final was the 69th final of the Greek Cup. It took place on 11 May 2013 at the Olympic Stadium. The contesting teams were Olympiacos and Asteras Tripolis. It was Asteras Tripolis' first ever Greek Cup final in their 72 years of existence and Olympiacos' thirty seventh and second consecutive Greek Cup final of their 88-year history. The match was marked by the bad refereeing of Athanasios Giachos, who deprived Asteras Tripolis the chance of winning the trophy on multiple occasions, once at the 68th minute, with the score at 1–1, the midfielder of Olympiacos, Maniatis saved a header from Sankaré pushing it back with his hand over the goal line, with the referee and his assistant turning a blind eye to the violation and indicating play on. Another was at the 117th minute, when the midfielder of Olympiacos, Fejsa fouled Rayos inside the area and no penalty was awarded. On the contrary, in the following phase the referee awarded Olympiacos a penalty, even though he was 40 meters away from the spot of the foul that was clearly outside the area. Several fans of the "red and whites" left the stadium before the award ceremony, as an act of bitterness over their club's loss.

== Venue ==
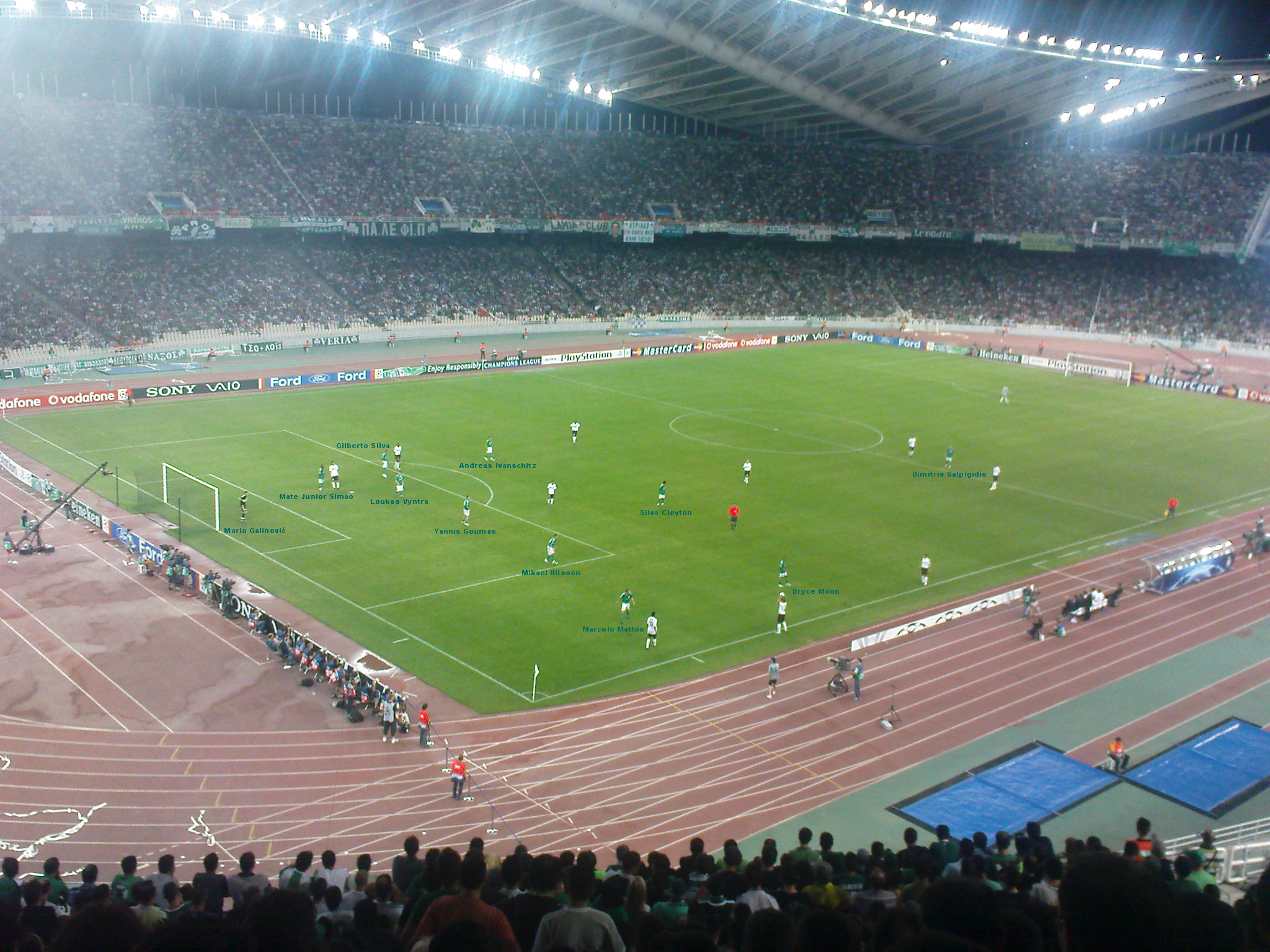
Athens Olympic Stadium.

This was the twentieth Greek Cup final held at the Athens Olympic Stadium, after the 1983, 1984, 1985, 1986, 1987, 1988, 1989, 1990, 1993, 1994, 1995, 1996, 1999, 2000, 2002, 2009, 2010, 2011 and 2012 finals.

The Athens Olympic Stadium was built in 1982 and renovated once in 2004. The stadium is used as a venue for AEK Athens and Panathinaikos and was used for Olympiacos and Greece on various occasions. Its current capacity is 69,618 and it hosted three European Cup/UEFA Champions League finals in 1983, 1994 and 2007, a UEFA Cup Winners' Cup final in 1987, the 1991 Mediterranean Games and the 2004 Summer Olympics.

== Background ==
Asteras Tripolis had never competed in a Cup final.

Olympiacos had reached the Greek Cup final thirty six times, winning twenty five of them. The last time that they had played in a final was in 2012, where they had won Atromitos by 2–1 after extra time.

The two teams had never met each other in a Cup final.

== Route to the final ==
Olympiacos				Round	Asteras Tripolis			
Opponent	Agg.	1st leg	2nd leg		Opponent	Agg.	1st leg	2nd leg
AEL	4–1	0–0 (A)	4–1 (H)	Round of 32	Panachaiki	5–0	2–0 (H)	3–0 (w/o) (A)
Olympiacos Volos	3–1	1–1 (A)	2–0 (H)	Round of 16	Kavala	3–0	2–0 (H)	1–0 (A)
Platanias	5–2	2–1 (A)	3–1 (H)	Quarter-finals	PAS Giannina	3–0	1–0 (A)	2–0 (H)
PAOK	3–2	1–2 (A)	2–0 (H)	Semi-finals	Panthrakikos	8–3	6–2 (H)	2–1 (A)

== Match ==
=== Details ===
11 May 2013
20:30 EEST

Asteras Tripolis	1–3 (a.e.t.)	Olympiacos
Rayo 14'	Report	Fuster 42'; Djebbour 98'; Abdoun 119' (pen.)

Olympic Stadium, Marousi
Attendance: 28,980
Referee: Athanasios Giachos (Chios)

Asteras Tripolis	Olympiacos

GK	1	(Hungary) Márton Fülöp
RB	11	(Greece) Savvas Tsabouris
CB	25	(Greece) Dimitrios Kourbelis	(yellow card) 55'	(substituted off) 67'
CB	19	(Senegal) Khalifa Sankaré
LB	3	(Greece) Christos Pipinis	(yellow card) 57'
DM	33	(Greece) Giannis Kontoes	(yellow card) 30'	(substituted off) 101'
CM	8	(Spain) Fernando Usero
RM	23	(Spain) Ximo Navarro	(yellow card) 103'
LM	32	(Argentina) Pablo de Blasis	(yellow card) 107'
AM	10	(Spain) Rubén Rayos (c)
CF	9	(Argentina) Emanuel Perrone	(yellow card) 79' (red card) 120+4'	(substituted off) 83'
Substitutes:
GK	37	(Greece) Georgios Bantis	(yellow card) 70'
DF	22	(Argentina) Sebastián Bartolini	(yellow card) 119'	(substituted on) 67'
MF	13	(Argentina) Leandro Álvarez
MF	14	(Greece) Anastasios Bakasetas
FW	18	(Venezuela) Francisco Pol Hurtado
FW	29	(Hungary) László Lencse		(substituted on) 83'
FW	96	(Greece) Christos Kalantzis		(substituted on) 101'
Manager:
(Greece) Sakis Tsiolis

GK	1	(Northern Ireland) Roy Carroll
RB	3	(France) François Modesto (c)	(red card) 120+3'	(substituted off) 60'
CB	24	(Greece) Kostas Manolas
CB	23	(Greece) Dimitrios Siovas
LB	20	(Greece) José Holebas	(yellow card) 30'
DM	8	(Serbia) Ljubomir Fejsa
CM	2	(Greece) Giannis Maniatis
CM	5	(Portugal) Paulo Machado		(substituted off) 76'
RW	19	(Spain) David Fuster
LW	93	(Algeria) Djamel Abdoun	(yellow card) 105'
CF	11	(Greece) Kostas Mitroglou		(substituted off) 72'
Substitutes:
GK	42	(Hungary) Balázs Megyeri
DF	15	(Chile) Pablo Contreras
DF	45	(Greece) Konstantinos Rougalas
MF	7	(Argentina) Ariel Ibagaza		(substituted on) 60'
MF	25	(Greece) Charalampos Lykogiannis
FW	99	(Colombia) Juan Pablo Pino	(yellow card) 81'	(substituted on) 76'
FW	10	(Algeria) Rafik Djebbour		(substituted on) 72'
Manager:
(Spain) Míchel

Man of the Match:
(Spain) David Fuster (Olympiacos)

Assistant referees:
Dimitrios Saraidaris (Macedonia)
Antonis Karatzikas (Athens)
Additional assistant referees:
Stavros Tritsonis (Athens)
Stavros Mantalos (Athens)
Fourth official:
Ilias Spathas (Piraeus)

Match rules

- 90 minutes
- 30 minutes of extra time if necessary
- Penalty shootout if scores still level
- Seven named substitutes
- Maximum of three substitutions
