= 2012–13 Olympiacos F.C. season =

Olympiacos
2012–13 season
- Chairman: Evangelos Marinakis
- Manager: Leonardo Jardim until 19 January 2013; Antonios Nikopolidis; 19 January – 4 February 2013; Míchel from 4 February 2013
- Stadium: Karaiskakis Stadium, Piraeus
- Super League Greece: Champions
- Greek Cup: Winners
- Champions League: Group stage
- Europa League: Round of 32
- Top goalscorer: League: Rafik Djebbour (20); All: Rafik Djebbour (22)
- Average home league attendance: 20,918
Home colours	Away colours	Third colours

The 2012–13 season was Olympiacos's 54th consecutive season in the Super League Greece and their 87th year in existence. They competed in the Greek Super League, Greek Cup, UEFA Champions League and UEFA Europa League.

Olympiacos completed a domestic double, winning the Super League and the Greek Cup. Olympiacos won the title for a third consecutive season, reaching 40 domestic titles and therefore adding a fourth star to the team's shirt.

The club finished third in Group B of the Champions League, which resulted in them entering the Europa League. Olympiacos was eliminated in Round of 32 by Levante with two defeats, falling 0–4 on aggregate.

== Players ==
=== First-team squad ===
Squad at end of season

Note: Flags indicate national team as defined under FIFA eligibility rules; some limited exceptions apply. Players may hold more than one non-FIFA nationality.

No.	Pos.	Nation	Player
1	GK	NIR	Roy Carroll
2	DF	GRE	Giannis Maniatis (Vice-captain)
3	DF	FRA	François Modesto
5	MF	POR	Paulo Machado
6	DF	GRE	Anastasios Papazoglou
7	MF	ARG	Ariel Ibagaza
8	MF	SRB	Ljubomir Fejsa
9	FW	SRB	Marko Pantelić
10	FW	ALG	Rafik Djebbour
11	FW	GRE	Kostas Mitroglou
15	DF	CHI	Pablo Contreras
17	MF	GRE	Panagiotis Vlachodimos
18	MF	GRE	Giannis Fetfatzidis
19	MF	ESP	David Fuster

No.	Pos.	Nation	Player
20	DF	GRE	José Holebas
21	DF	GRE	Avraam Papadopoulos (Vice-captain)
23	DF	GRE	Dimitris Siovas
24	DF	GRE	Kostas Manolas
25	DF	GRE	Charalambos Lykogiannis
26	MF	MLI	Drissa Diakité
27	MF	ITA	Leandro Greco
32	DF	GRE	Vasilis Karagounis
42	GK	HUN	Balázs Megyeri
44	DF	GRE	Konstantinos Rougalas
45	GK	GRE	Aristidis Vlachos
70	GK	GRE	Andreas Gianniotis
93	MF	ALG	Djamel Abdoun
99	FW	COL	Juan Pablo Pino

== Transfers ==
=== Summer ===
In: Note: Flags indicate national team as defined under FIFA eligibility rules; some limited exceptions apply. Players may hold more than one non-FIFA nationality.

No.	Pos.	Nation	Player
5	MF	POR	Paulo Machado (from (France) Toulouse)
15	DF	CHI	Pablo Contreras (from (Chile) Colo-Colo)
17	MF	GRE	Panagiotis Vlachodimos (from (Greece) Skoda Xanthi)
23	DF	GRE	Dimitris Siovas (from (Greece) Panionios)
24	DF	GRE	Kostas Manolas (from (Greece) AEK Athens)
26	MF	MLI	Drissa Diakité (from (France) Nice)
27	MF	ITA	Leandro Greco (from (Italy) Roma)
32	DF	GRE	Vasilis Karagounis (from (Italy) Udinese)
70	GK	GRE	Andreas Gianniotis (from (Greece) Ethnikos Gazoros)
—	DF	FRA	Claude Dielna (from (France) Istres)
—	MF	SRB	Aleksandar Katai (loan return from (Serbia) Vojvodina)
—	MF	MNE	Petar Grbić (loan return from (Israel) Hapoel Be'er Sheva)
—	MF	BRA	Chumbinho (loan return from (Greece) Levadiakos)
—	DF	GRE	Giorgos Valerianos (loan return from (Greece) Glyfada)
—	MF	GRE	Andreas Vasilogiannis (loan return from (Greece) Glyfada)
—	DF	GRE	Giannis Zaradoukas (loan return from (Greece) PAS Giannina)
—	FW	GRE	Kostas Mitroglou (loan return from (Greece) Atromitos)
—	MF	GRE	Andreas Tatos (loan return from (Greece) Atromitos)
—	FW	GRE	Giorgos Niklitsiotis (loan return from (Netherlands) Helmond Sport)

Out: Note: Flags indicate national team as defined under FIFA eligibility rules; some limited exceptions apply. Players may hold more than one non-FIFA nationality.

No.	Pos.	Nation	Player
4	DF	SWE	Olof Mellberg (to (Spain) Villarreal)
11	MF	TUR	Colin Kazim-Richards (loan return to (Turkey) Galatasaray)
14	FW	BEL	Kevin Mirallas (to (England) Everton)
23	DF	ESP	Iván Marcano (loan return to (Spain) Villarreal)
31	MF	ESP	Pablo Orbaiz (loan return to (Spain) Athletic Bilbao)
77	MF	CMR	Jean Makoun (loan return to (England) Aston Villa)
—	MF	ARG	Vicente Monje (to (Turkey) Orduspor)
—	FW	HUN	Krisztián Németh (to (Netherlands) Roda JC)
—	FW	BRA	Wanderson (to (South Africa) Ajax Cape Town)
—	MF	ESP	Javito (Free agent)
—	GK	GRE	Nikolas Papadopoulos (to (Germany) Fortuna Düsseldorf)
—	GK	GRE	Iosif Daskalakis (to (Greece) Veria)
—	MF	GRE	Panagiotis Stamogiannos (to (Greece) Kerkyra)
—	MF	GRE	Giorgos Niklitsiotis (to (Greece) PAS Giannina)
—	DF	GRE	Giorgos Valerianos (to (Greece) OFI Crete)
—	MF	BRA	Chumbinho (on loan to (Greece) Atromitos)
—	MF	GRE	Andreas Vasilogiannis (on loan to (Greece) Erkyra)
—	DF	GRE	Giannis Potouridis (on loan to (Greece) Platanias)
—	FW	GRE	Dimitrios Diamantakos (on loan to (Greece) Panionios)
—	DF	FRA	Claude Dielna (on loan to (France) Sedan)
—	MF	SRB	Aleksandar Katai (on loan to (Serbia) Vojvodina)
—	FW	MNE	Petar Grbić (on loan to (Serbia) OFK Beograd)
—	GK	SRB	Ivan Babovic (on loan to (Greece) Panachaiki)

=== Winter ===
In: Note: Flags indicate national team as defined under FIFA eligibility rules; some limited exceptions apply. Players may hold more than one non-FIFA nationality.

No.	Pos.	Nation	Player
99	FW	COL	Juan Pablo Pino (from (Turkey) Galatasaray)

Out: Note: Flags indicate national team as defined under FIFA eligibility rules; some limited exceptions apply. Players may hold more than one non-FIFA nationality.

No.	Pos.	Nation	Player
31	DF	GRE	Giannis Zaradoukas (loan to (Greece) Aris)
35	DF	GRE	Vasilis Torosidis (to (Italy) Roma)
87	FW	BRA	Diogo (to (Brazil) Portuguesa)
—	MF	GRE	Andreas Tatos (loan to (Greece) Aris)

== Competitions ==
=== Super League Greece ===
==== League table ====
Pos	Team	Pld	W	D	L	GF	GA	GD	Pts	Qualification or relegation
1	Olympiacos (C)	30	24	5	1	64	16	+48	77	Qualification for the Champions League group stage
2	PAOK	30	18	8	4	46	19	+27	62	Qualification for the Play-offs
3	Asteras Tripolis	30	17	5	8	41	25	+16	56	Qualification for the Play-offs
4	Atromitos	30	11	13	6	26	22	+4	46	Qualification for the Play-offs
5	PAS Giannina	30	12	8	10	28	24	+4	44	Qualification for the Play-offs

Source: Super League Greece
Rules for classification: 1) Points; 2) Head-to-head points; 3) Head-to-head goal difference.
If in current league table there are tied teams after applying criteria 1 to 3, they are considered to share places and listed in Greek language alphabetic order.
If in final league table there are still tied teams after applying criteria 1 to 3, a decision match (or matches if they are more than two) are to be played but only in three cases: to determine the champion, to fill spots in the play-off or to determine the teams to be relegated. In any other case, the final standings of tied teams are determined with a public draw
(C) Champions

==== Results summary ====
Overall								Home						Away					
Pld	W	D	L	GF	GA	GD	Pts	W	D	L	GF	GA	GD	W	D	L	GF	GA	GD
30	24	5	1	64	16	+48	77	12	2	1	34	8	+26	12	3	0	30	8	+22

Last updated: 21 April 2013.
Source: Competitive matches

==== Results by round ====
Round	1	2	3	4	5	6	7	8	9	10	11	12	13	14	15	16	17	18	19	20	21	22	23	24	25	26	27	28	29	30
Ground	A	H	A	H	A	H	H	A	H	A	H	A	H	A	A	H	A	H	A	H	A	A	H	A	H	A	H	A	H	H
Result	W	W	W	W	W	W	W	D	W	W	W	D	W	D	W	W	W	W	W	L	W	W	W	W	W	W	D	W	D	W
Position	2	1	1	1	1	1	1	1	1	1	1	1	1	1	1	1	1	1	1	1	1	1	1	1	1	1	1	1	1	1

A = Away; H = Home; W = Win; D = Draw; L = Loss

==== Matches ====
26 August 2012 1	Veria	1–2	Olympiacos	Veria
21:30 EET	Ioannou 30'	Summary	Djebbour 20'; Modesto 42'	Stadium: Veria Stadium; Attendance: 5,169; Referee: Mihail Voskakis

2 September 2012 2	Olympiacos	4–0	Levadiakos	Piraeus
20:30 EET	Siovas 5'; Djebbour 38', 75'; Maniatis 63'	Summary		Stadium: Karaiskakis Stadium; Attendance: 18,751; Referee: Alexandros Dimitropoulos

15 September 2012 3	PAS Giannina	1–2	Olympiacos	Ioannina
19:30 EET	Georgiou 68'	Summary	Mitroglou 60'; Djebbour 67'	Stadium: Zosimades Stadium; Attendance: 4,052; Referee: Michael Koukoulakis

23 September 2012 4	Olympiacos	4–1	Panthrakikos	Piraeus
20:30 EET	Djebbour 4', 51'; Holebas 27'; Skliopidis 29' (o.g.)	Summary	Kyvelidis 83'	Stadium: Karaiskakis Stadium; Attendance: 14,244; Referee: Konstantinos Ioannidis

29 September 2012 5	Atromitos	0–1	Olympiacos	Peristeri
19:30 EET		Summary	Fuster 32'	Stadium: Peristeri Stadium; Attendance: 5,132; Referee: Andreas Pappas

7 October 2012 6	Olympiacos	1–0	Asteras Tripolis	Piraeus
20:30 EET	Holebas 43'	Summary		Stadium: Karaiskakis Stadium; Attendance: 17,890; Referee: Stavros Mantalos

20 October 2012 7	Olympiacos	4–0	Skoda Xanthi	Piraeus
17:15 EET	Manolas 37'; Holebas 51'; Djebbour 54', 63'	Summary		Stadium: Karaiskakis Stadium; Attendance: 19,830; Referee: Dimitrios Styliaras

29 October 2012 8	Aris	2–2	Olympiacos	Thessaloniki
19:30 EET	Papasterianos 3'; Aganzo 79'; Psychogios (red card) 81'	Summary	Abdoun 9' (pen.); Holebas 82'	Stadium: Kleanthis Vikelidis Stadium; Attendance: 9,143; Referee: Alexis Aretopoulos

3 November 2012 9	Olympiacos	2–0	OFI	Piraeus
19:30 EET	Mitroglou 42'; Machado 55'	Summary		Stadium: Karaiskakis Stadium; Attendance: 16,359; Referee: Apostolos Amparkiolis

10 November 2012 10	AEK Athens	0–4	Olympiacos	Athens
19:30 EET	Yago (red card) 22'	Summary	Abdoun 23' (pen.); Mitroglou 57', 88'; Fuster 85'	Stadium: Olympic Stadium; Attendance: 15,272; Referee: Anastasios Sidiropoulos

17 November 2012 11	Olympiacos	2–0	Kerkyra	Piraeus
19:30 EET	Mitroglou 23'; Siovas 56'	Summary		Stadium: Karaiskakis Stadium; Attendance: 13,534; Referee: Konstantinos Ioannidis

25 November 2012 12	PAOK	1–1	Olympiacos	Thessaloniki
19:30 EET	Athanasiadis 88'	Summary	Djebbour 27'	Stadium: Toumba Stadium; Attendance: 23,023; Referee: Stavros Mantalos

1 December 2012 13	Olympiacos	2–1	Platanias	Piraeus
19:30 EET	Abdoun 6' (pen.); Torosidis 19'	Summary	Udoji 37'	Stadium: Karaiskakis Stadium; Attendance: 17,222; Referee: Alexandros Dimitropoulos

9 December 2012 14	Panathinaikos	2–2	Olympiacos	Athens
19:30 EET	Mavrias 17'; Toché 67'	Summary	Djebbour 22', 34'	Stadium: Leoforos Alexandras Stadium; Attendance: 27,673; Referee: Stavros Mantalos

15 December 2012 15	Panionios	1–2	Olympiacos	Nea Smyrni
19:30 EET	Aravidis 25'; Kouloucheris (yellow card) 51' (yellow-red card) 84'	Summary	Spyropoulos 30' (o.g.); Djebbour 82'	Stadium: Panionios Stadium; Attendance: 1,991; Referee: Ilias Spathas

6 January 2013 16	Olympiacos	3–0	Veria	Piraeus
19:30 EET	Mitroglou 54'; Djebbour 86' (pen.); Pantelić 90+1'	Summary		Stadium: Karaiskakis Stadium; Attendance: 20,681; Referee: Charalambos Kalogeropoulos

12 January 2013 17	Levadiakos	0–1	Olympiacos	Livadeia
19:30 EET		Summary	Djebbour 90+7'	Stadium: Levadia Municipal Stadium; Attendance: 2,685; Referee: Mihail Voskakis

20 January 2013 18	Olympiacos	2–0	PAS Giannina	Piraeus
17:15 EET	Djebbour 45+2'; Abdoun 68'	Summary		Stadium: Karaiskakis Stadium; Attendance: 20,027; Referee: Georgios Daskalopoulos

27 January 2013 19	Panthrakikos	0–1	Olympiacos	Komotini
17:15 EET		Summary	Contreras 86'	Stadium: Komotini Municipal Stadium; Attendance: 3,377; Referee: Apostolos Amparkiolis

3 February 2013 20	Olympiacos	2–3	Atromitos	Piraeus
19:15 EET	Djebbour 9'; Abdoun 44'	Summary	Brito 1'; Karagounis 48'; Dimoutsos 79'	Stadium: Karaiskakis Stadium; Attendance: 18,747; Referee: Stavros Mantalos

9 February 2013 21	Asteras Tripolis	0–1	Olympiacos	Tripoli
19:30 EET	Sankaré (yellow card) 12' (yellow-red card) 56'	Summary	Mitroglou 90+2'	Stadium: Asteras Tripolis Stadium; Attendance: 5,076; Referee: Ilias Spathas

17 February 2013 22	Skoda Xanthi	0–2	Olympiacos	Xanthi
17:15 EET		Summary	Machado 29'; Djebbour 68'	Stadium: Skoda Xanthi Arena; Attendance: 2,740; Referee: Andreas Pappas

24 February 2013 23	Olympiacos	2–1	Aris	Piraeus
19:30 EET	Djebbour 9'; Maniatis 37'	Summary		Stadium: Karaiskakis Stadium; Attendance: 17,002; Referee: Anastasios Sidiropoulos

2 March 2013 24	OFI	0–4	Olympiacos	Heraklion
19:30 EET		Summary	Djebbour 7', 78'; Vlachodimos 69'; Papazoglou 86'	Stadium: Theodoros Vardinogiannis Stadium; Attendance: 3,106; Referee: Anastasios Kakos

10 March 2013 25	Olympiacos	3–0	AEK Athens	Piraeus
19:30 EET	Papadopoulos 14', 56'; Abdoun 62'	Summary		Stadium: Karaiskakis Stadium; Attendance: 30,293; Referee: Athanasios Giachos

17 March 2013 26	Kerkyra	0–1	Olympiacos	Corfu
17:15 EET		Summary	Mitroglou 79'	Stadium: Kerkyra Stadium; Attendance: 755; Referee: Alexis Aretopoulos

31 March 2013 27	Olympiacos	0–0	PAOK	Piraeus
19:30 EET		Summary		Stadium: Karaiskakis Stadium; Attendance: 28,417; Referee: Anastasios Sidiropoulos

7 April 2013 28	Platanias	0–4	Olympiacos	Platanias
17:15 EET		Summary	Abdoun 20'; Fuster 62'; Mitroglou 80'; Vlachodimos 90+3'	Stadium: Perivolia Municipal Stadium; Attendance: 2,998; Referee: Anastasios Kakos

14 April 2013 29	Olympiacos	1–1	Panathinaikos	Piraeus
19:00 EET	Mitroglou 87'	Summary	Figueroa 73'	Stadium: Karaiskakis Stadium; Attendance: 32,018; Referee: Andreas Pappas

21 April 2013 30	Olympiacos	2–1	Panionios	Piraeus
19:00 EET	Mitroglou 12'; Papadopoulos 72'	Summary	Samaris 20'	Stadium: Karaiskakis Stadium; Attendance: 29,463; Referee: Marios Labropoulos

=== Greek Cup ===
==== Third round ====
28 November 2012 First leg	Olympiacos	2–0	Panachaiki	Piraeus
20:30 UTC+2	Djebbour 47'; Mitroglou 71'	Report		Stadium: Karaiskakis Stadium; Referee: Dimitris Thanos (Grevena)

19 December 2012 Second leg	Panachaiki	0–3 (w/o) (0–5 agg.)	Olympiacos	Patras
14:30 UTC+2	Gourtsas 4'; G. Voskopoulos (yellow card) 12' (yellow-red card) 37'	Report	Fetfatzidis 57'	Stadium: Kostas Davourlis Stadium; Referee: Alexandros Dimitropoulos (Phthiotis)
Note: Match suspended at 87th minute while the score was 1–1.

==== Fourth round ====
16 January 2013 First leg	Olympiacos	2–0	Kavala	Piraeus
20:00 UTC+2	Papazoglou 60'; Fejsa 82'	Report	Pliagas (yellow card) 39' (yellow-red card) 62'	Stadium: Karaiskakis Stadium; Referee: Anastasios Papapetrou (Athens)

30 January 2013 Second leg	Kavala	0–1 (0–3 agg.)	Olympiacos	Kavala
20:00 UTC+2		Report	Siovas 12'	Stadium: Anthi Karagianni Stadium; Referee: Antonis Foukakis (Heraklion)

==== Quarter-finals ====
27 February 2013 First leg	PAS Giannina	0–1	Olympiacos	Ioannina
20:00 UTC+2		Report	Abdoun 54'	Stadium: Zosimades Stadium; Referee: Giannis Topouzis (Thrace)

13 March 2013 Second leg	Olympiacos	2–0 (3–0 agg.)	PAS Giannina	Piraeus
18:00 UTC+2	Maniatis 63'; Abdoun 90+3'	Report		Stadium: Karaiskakis Stadium; Referee: Konsantinos Ioannidis (Argolida)

==== Semi-finals ====
18 April 2013 First leg	Olympiacos	6–2	Panthrakikos	Piraeus
20:00 UTC+2	Melissis 4' (o.g.); Ibagaza 11'; Mitroglou 48', 53'; Fetfatzidis 51'; Fuster 55'	Report	Tzanis 19'; Lucero 32'	Stadium: Karaiskakis Stadium; Referee: Charalambos Kalogeropoulos (Athens)

28 April 2013 Second leg	Panthrakikos	1–2 (3–8 agg.)	Olympiacos	Komotini
18:00 UTC+2	Papadopoulos 83' (pen.)	Report	Mitroglou 27', 40'	Stadium: Komotini Municipal Stadium; Referee: Alexandros Aretopoulos (Trikala)

==== Final ====
11 May 2013 Final	Olympiacos	3–1 (a.e.t.)	Asteras Tripolis	Athens
20:30	Fuster 42'; Djebbour 98'; Abdoun 119' (pen.)	Report	Rayos 14'	Stadium: Olympic Stadium; Attendance: 28,980; Referee: Athanasios Giachos (Chios)

=== UEFA Champions League ===
==== Group stage ====
Group B

Pos	Team	Pld	W	D	L	GF	GA	GD	Pts	Qualification
1	(Germany) Schalke 04	6	3	3	0	10	6	+4	12	Advance to knockout phase
2	(England) Arsenal	6	3	1	2	10	8	+2	10	Advance to knockout phase
3	(Greece) Olympiacos	6	3	0	3	9	9	0	9	Transfer to Europa League
4	(France) Montpellier	6	0	2	4	6	12	−6	2	

Source: Soccerway

18 September 2012 1	Olympiacos (Greece)	1–2	(Germany) Schalke 04	Piraeus, Greece
21:45 EET	Abdoun 58'	Report	Höwedes 41'; Huntelaar 59'	Stadium: Karaiskakis Stadium; Attendance: 30,922; Referee: David Fernández Borbalán (Spain)

3 October 2012 2	Arsenal (England)	3–1	(Greece) Olympiacos	London, England
21:45 EET	Gervinho 42'; Podolski 56'; Ramsey 90+4'	Report	Mitroglou 45+1'	Stadium: Emirates Stadium; Attendance: 60,034; Referee: Svein Oddvar Moen (Norway)

24 October 2012 3	Montpellier (France)	1–2	(Greece) Olympiacos	Montpellier, France
21:45 EET	Charbonnier 49'	Report	Torosidis 73'; Mitroglou 90+1'	Stadium: Stade de la Mosson; Attendance: 22,834; Referee: Daniele Orsato (Italy)

6 November 2012 4	Olympiacos (Greece)	3–1	(France) Montpellier	Piraeus, Greece
21:45 EET	Machado 4'; Greco 80'; Mitroglou 82'	Report	Belhanda 66' (pen.)	Stadium: Karaiskakis Stadium; Attendance: 28,217; Referee: Marijo Strahonja (Croatia)

21 November 2012 5	Schalke 04 (Germany)	1–0	(Greece) Olympiacos	Gelsenkirchen, Germany
21:45 EET	Fuchs 77'	Report		Stadium: Veltins-Arena; Attendance: 52,254; Referee: Björn Kuipers (Netherlands)

4 December 2012 6	Olympiacos (Greece)	2–1	(England) Arsenal	Piraeus, Greece
21:45 EET	Maniatis 64'; Mitroglou 73'	Report	Rosický 38'	Stadium: Karaiskakis Stadium; Attendance: 28,128; Referee: Alberto Undiano Mallenco (Spain)

=== UEFA Europa League ===
==== Knockout phase ====
===== Round of 32 =====
14 February 2013 First leg	Levante (Spain)	3–0	(Greece) Olympiacos	Valencia, Spain
20:00 EET	Ríos 10'; Barkero 40' (pen.); Martins 56'	Report	Abdoun (yellow card) 18' (red card) 29'	Stadium: Estadi Ciutat de València; Attendance: 14,000; Referee: Manuel Gräfe (Germany)

21 February 2013 Second leg	Olympiacos (Greece)	0–1 (0–4 agg.)	(Spain) Levante	Piraeus, Greece
22:05 EET		Report	Martins 9'	Stadium: Karaiskakis Stadium; Attendance: 30,000; Referee: Matej Jug (Slovenia)

== Squad statistics ==
=== Appearances and goals ===
No.	Pos	Nat	Player	Total		Super League Greece		Greek Cup		Champions League		Europa League	
No.	Pos	Nat	Player	Apps	Goals	Apps	Goals	Apps	Goals	Apps	Goals	Apps	Goals
1	GK	(Northern Ireland) NIR	Roy Carroll	27	0	16+0	0	6+0	0	4+0	0	1+0	0
2	DF	(Greece) GRE	Giannis Maniatis	39	4	25+2	2	4+1	1	6+0	1	1+0	0
3	DF	(France) FRA	François Modesto	30	1	18+2	1	4+1	0	4+0	0	1+0	0
5	MF	(Portugal) POR	Paulo Machado	42	3	23+5	2	5+1	0	6+0	1	2+0	0
6	DF	(Greece) GRE	Anastasios Papazoglou	22	2	13+2	1	7+0	1	0+0	0	0+0	0
7	MF	(Argentina) ARG	Ariel Ibagaza	30	1	10+11	0	1+3	1	0+4	0	0+1	0
8	MF	(Serbia) SRB	Ljubomir Fejsa	27	1	11+4	0	8+0	1	1+1	0	2+0	0
9	FW	(Serbia) SRB	Marko Pantelić	9	0	0+6	0	1+1	0	0+1	0	0+0	0
10	FW	(Algeria) ALG	Rafik Djebbour	36	22	23+2	20	2+3	2	3+1	0	2+0	0
11	FW	(Greece) GRE	Kostas Mitroglou	42	20	10+15	11	8+1	5	3+3	4	1+1	0
15	DF	(Chile) CHI	Pablo Contreras	27	1	16+1	1	4+0	0	4+0	0	2+0	0
17	MF	(Greece) GRE	Panagiotis Vlachodimos	19	2	8+4	2	4+1	0	0+0	0	2+0	0
18	MF	(Greece) GRE	Giannis Fetfatzidis	22	1	4+8	0	4+4	1	0+0	0	0+2	0
19	MF	(Spain) ESP	David Fuster	30	5	9+9	3	5+1	2	3+3	0	0+0	0
20	DF	(Greece) GRE	José Holebas	40	4	28+0	4	5+0	0	5+0	0	1+1	0
21	DF	(Greece) GRE	Avraam Papadopoulos	7	3	5+0	3	1+1	0	0+0	0	0+0	0
23	DF	(Greece) GRE	Dimitris Siovas	25	3	13+2	2	4+2	1	3+0	0	1+0	0
24	DF	(Greece) GRE	Kostas Manolas	37	1	24+0	1	6+0	0	6+0	0	1+0	0
25	DF	(Greece) GRE	Charalambos Lykogiannis	9	0	2+2	0	2+0	0	0+2	0	1+0	0
26	MF	(Mali) MLI	Drissa Diakité	10	0	4+0	0	3+1	0	2+0	0	0+0	0
27	MF	(Italy) ITA	Leandro Greco	38	1	15+9	0	6+0	0	5+1	1	1+1	0
42	GK	(Hungary) HUN	Balázs Megyeri	20	0	14+0	0	3+0	0	2+0	0	1+0	0
93	MF	(Algeria) ALG	Djamel Abdoun	38	11	27+0	7	3+1	3	4+2	1	1+0	0
99	FW	(Colombia) COL	Juan Pablo Pino	6	0	1+2	0	1+2	0	0+0	0	0+0	0
	FW	(Greece) GRE	Nikolaos Ioannidis	1	0	0+0	0	0+1	0	0+0	0	0+0	0
Players who left Olympiacos on loan during the season:
22	DF	(Greece) GRE	Andreas Tatos	1	0	1+0	0	0+0	0	0+0	0	0+0	0
31	DF	(Greece) GRE	Giannis Zaradoukas	3	0	0+1	0	2+0	0	0+0	0	0+0	0
Players who appeared for Olympiacos but left during the season:
35	DF	(Greece) GRE	Vasilis Torosidis	17	2	10+2	1	0+0	0	5+0	1	0+0	0
87	FW	(Brazil) BRA	Diogo	1	0	0+1	0	0+0	0	0+0	0	0+0	0

=== Goal scorers ===
Place	Position	Nation	Number	Name	Super League Greece	Greek Cup	Champions League	Europa League	Total
1	FW	(Algeria)	10	Rafik Djebbour	20	2	0	0	22
2	FW	(Greece)	11	Kostas Mitroglou	11	5	4	0	20
3	MF	(Algeria)	93	Djamel Abdoun	7	3	1	0	11
4	MF	(Spain)	19	David Fuster	3	2	0	0	5
5	DF	(Greece)	20	José Holebas	4	0	0	0	4
5	DF	(Greece)	2	Giannis Maniatis	2	1	1	0	4
7	DF	(Greece)	21	Avraam Papadopoulos	3	0	0	0	3
7	DF	(Greece)	23	Dimitris Siovas	2	1	0	0	3
7	MF	(Portugal)	5	Paulo Machado	2	0	1	0	3
7				Own goal	2	1	0	0	3
7				Awarded goals	0	3	0	0	3
12	MF	(Greece)	17	Panagiotis Vlachodimos	2	0	0	0	2
12	MF	(Greece)	35	Vasilis Torosidis	1	0	1	0	2
12	DF	(Greece)	6	Anastasios Papazoglou	1	1	0	0	2
15	DF	(France)	3	François Modesto	1	0	0	0	1
15	DF	(Greece)	24	Kostas Manolas	1	0	0	0	1
15	FW	(Serbia)	9	Marko Pantelić	1	0	0	0	1
15	DF	(Chile)	15	Pablo Contreras	1	0	0	0	1
15	MF	(Serbia)	8	Ljubomir Fejsa	0	1	0	0	1
15	MF	(Argentina)	7	Ariel Ibagaza	0	1	0	0	1
15	MF	(Greece)	18	Giannis Fetfatzidis	0	1	0	0	1
15	MF	(Italy)	27	Leandro Greco	0	0	1	0	1
				TOTALS	64	22	9	0	95

=== Disciplinary record ===
Number	Nation	Position	Name	Super League Greece		Greek Cup		Champions League		Europa League		Total	
Number	Nation	Position	Name	Yellow card	Red card	Yellow card	Red card	Yellow card	Red card	Yellow card	Red card	Yellow card	Red card
1	(Northern Ireland)	GK	Roy Carroll	0	0	0	0	0	0	1	0	1	0
2	(Greece)	DF	Giannis Maniatis	2	0	0	0	0	0	1	0	3	0
3	(France)	DF	François Modesto	1	0	0	1	1	0	1	0	3	1
5	(Portugal)	MF	Paulo Machado	1	0	0	0	0	0	0	0	1	0
6	(Greece)	DF	Anastasios Papazoglou	2	0	1	0	0	0	0	0	3	0
7	(Argentina)	MF	Ariel Ibagaza	2	0	0	0	1	0	1	0	4	0
8	(Serbia)	MF	Ljubomir Fejsa	1	0	1	0	1	0	0	0	3	0
10	(Algeria)	FW	Rafik Djebbour	0	0	0	0	0	0	1	0	1	0
11	(Greece)	FW	Kostas Mitroglou	1	0	1	0	1	0	0	0	3	0
15	(Chile)	DF	Pablo Contreras	4	0	0	0	2	0	0	0	6	0
17	(Greece)	MF	Panagiotis Vlachodimos	1	0	0	0	0	0	1	0	2	0
19	(Spain)	MF	David Fuster	2	0	0	0	1	0	0	0	3	0
20	(Greece)	DF	José Holebas	2	0	1	0	3	0	2	0	8	0
21	(Greece)	DF	Avraam Papadopoulos	1	0	0	0	0	0	0	0	1	0
23	(Greece)	DF	Dimitris Siovas	1	0	0	0	0	0	0	0	1	0
24	(Greece)	DF	Kostas Manolas	2	0	0	0	1	0	1	0	4	0
25	(Greece)	DF	Charalambos Lykogiannis	1	0	1	0	0	0	0	0	2	0
26	(Mali)	MF	Drissa Diakité	0	0	1	0	0	0	0	0	1	0
27	(Italy)	MF	Leandro Greco	3	0	1	0	1	0	1	0	6	0
87	(Brazil)	FW	Diogo	1	0	0	0	0	0	0	0	1	0
93	(Algeria)	MF	Djamel Abdoun	1	0	1	0	1	0	1	1	4	1
			TOTALS	29	0	8	1	13	0	11	1	61	2

== Individual Awards ==
Name	Pos.	Award
(Algeria) Djamel Abdoun	Winger	Super League Greece Player of the Season
(Algeria) Rafik Djebbour	Forward	Super League Greece Golden Boot

== Team kit ==
Home	Away	Third	Friendlies
