= 2011–12 Olympiacos F.C. season =

Olympiacos
2011–12 season
- Chairman: Evangelos Marinakis
- Manager: Ernesto Valverde
- Stadium: Karaiskakis Stadium, Piraeus
- Super League Greece: 1st
- Greek Cup: Winners
- Champions League: Group stage
- Europa League: Round of 16
- Top goalscorer: League: Kevin Mirallas (20); All: Kevin Mirallas (20)
- Highest home attendance: 31,553 vs. Panathinaikos (19 November 2011)
- Lowest home attendance: 14,372 vs. Levadiakos (14 January 2012)
- Average home league attendance: 21,529
Home colours	Away colours	Third colours

The 2011–12 season was Olympiacos's 53rd consecutive season in the Super League Greece and their 86th year in existence.

The season was one of the best of the club's history. The club reached UEFA Europa's League Round of 16, and won both titles (Super League and Greek Cup), while performing beautiful football.

Olympiacos finished 1st in the Greek Super League, winning the title for a second consecutive season.

== Players ==
=== First-team squad ===
Squad at end of season

Note: Flags indicate national team as defined under FIFA eligibility rules; some limited exceptions apply. Players may hold more than one non-FIFA nationality.

No.	Pos.	Nation	Player
1	GK	NIR	Roy Carroll
2	DF	GRE	Giannis Maniatis
3	DF	FRA	François Modesto
4	DF	SWE	Olof Mellberg
6	DF	GRE	Anastasios Papazoglou
7	MF	ARG	Ariel Ibagaza
8	MF	SRB	Ljubomir Fejsa
9	FW	SRB	Marko Pantelić
10	FW	ALG	Rafik Djebbour
11	MF	TUR	Colin Kazim-Richards
14	FW	BEL	Kevin Mirallas
18	MF	GRE	Ioannis Fetfatzidis
19	MF	ESP	David Fuster
20	DF	GRE	José Cholevas

No.	Pos.	Nation	Player
21	DF	GRE	Avraam Papadopoulos (Vice-Captain)
23	DF	ESP	Ivan Marcano
26	MF	ARG	Vicente Monje
31	MF	ESP	Pablo Orbaiz
35	DF	GRE	Vasilis Torosidis (Captain)
42	GK	HUN	Balázs Megyeri
75	GK	GRE	Nikos Papadopoulos
76	GK	SRB	Ivan Babovic
77	MF	CMR	Jean Makoun
87	FW	BRA	Diogo
92	DF	GRE	Ioannis Potouridis
93	MF	ALG	Djamel Abdoun
99	GK	GRE	Iosif Daskalakis

== Transfers ==
=== Summer ===
In: Note: Flags indicate national team as defined under FIFA eligibility rules; some limited exceptions apply. Players may hold more than one non-FIFA nationality.

No.	Pos.	Nation	Player
—	MF	GRE	Andreas Tatos (from (Greece) Atromitos)
31	MF	ESP	Pablo Orbaiz (loan from (Spain) Athletic Bilbao)
77	MF	CMR	Jean Makoun (loan from (England) Aston Villa)
93	MF	ALG	Djamel Abdoun (from (Greece) Kavala)
99	GK	GRE	Iosif Daskalakis (from (Greece) Ergotelis)
—	DF	GRE	Giannis Zaradoukas (from (Greece) Olympiacos Volos)

Out: Note: Flags indicate national team as defined under FIFA eligibility rules; some limited exceptions apply. Players may hold more than one non-FIFA nationality.

No.	Pos.	Nation	Player
—	MF	GRE	Andreas Tatos (loan to (Greece) Atromitos)
—	FW	BRA	Diogo Luis Santo (loan to (Brazil) Santos)
—	MF	ESP	Albert Riera (to (Turkey) Galatasaray)
—	FW	GRE	Kostas Mitroglou (loan to (Greece) Atromitos)
—	MF	BRA	Chumbinho (loan to (Greece) OFI Crete)

== Competitions ==
=== Super League Greece ===
==== League table ====
Pos	Team	Pld	W	D	L	GF	GA	GD	Pts	Qualification or relegation
1	Olympiacos (C)	30	23	4	3	70	17	+53	73	Qualification for the Champions League group stage
2	Panathinaikos (Note: Panathinaikos was docked three points following severe crowd violence during a match against Olympiacos and lost the game 0–3.)	30	22	3	5	54	23	+31	66	Qualification for the Play-offs
3	PAOK	30	14	8	8	45	27	+18	50 (Note: Head-to-head points: PAOK 4, Atromitos 1.)	Qualification for the Play-offs
4	Atromitos	30	13	11	6	32	26	+6	50	Qualification for the Play-offs
5	AEK Athens	30	13	9	8	36	30	+6	48	Qualification for the Play-offs

Source: Super League Greece
Rules for classification: 1) Points, 2) Head-to-head points, 3) Head-to-head goal difference.
If in current league table there are tied teams after applying criteria 1 to 3, they are considered to share places and listed in Greek language alphabetic order.
If in final league table there are still tied teams after applying criteria 1 to 3, a decision match (or matches if they are more than two) are to be played but only in three cases: to determine the champion, to fill spots in the play-off or to determine the teams to be relegated. In any other case, the final standings of tied teams are determined with a public draw
(C) Champions

==== Results summary ====
Overall								Home						Away					
Pld	W	D	L	GF	GA	GD	Pts	W	D	L	GF	GA	GD	W	D	L	GF	GA	GD
30	23	4	3	70	17	+53	73	12	2	1	38	9	+29	11	2	2	32	8	+24

Last updated: 22 April 2012.
Source: Competitive matches

==== Results by round ====
Round	1	2	3	4	5	6	7	8	9	10	11	12	13	14	15	16	17	18	19	20	21	22	23	24	25	26	27	28	29	30
Ground	H	A	H	A	H	A	A	H	A	H	A	H	A	H	H	A	H	A	H	A	H	H	A	H	A	H	A	H	A	A
Result	W	W	W	W	W	D	W	D	W	D	L	W	W	W	W	D	W	L	W	W	W	W	W	W	W	W	W	L	W	W
Position	1	1	1	1	1	1	1	1	1	1	2	1	1	1	1	1	1	2	2	1	1	1	1	1	1	1	1	1	1	1

A = Away; H = Home; W = Win; D = Draw; L = Loss

==== Matches ====
30 August 2011 1	Olympiacos	6–0	Doxa Drama	Neo Faliro, Piraeus
19:00 EET	Pantelić 2', 61'; Sikalias 31' (o.g.); Mirallas 52', 90+2'; Javito 87'	Report		Stadium: Karaiskakis Stadium; Attendance: 15,067; Referee: Giorgos Kominis

14 September 2011 2	Levadiakos	0–4	Olympiacos	Levadia
18:00 EET		Report	Pantelić 10'; Mirallas 16', 39', 59'	Stadium: Levadia Municipal Stadium; Attendance: 3,060; Referee: Alexis Aretopoulos

18 September 2011 3	Olympiacos	2–1	Skoda Xanthi	Neo Faliro, Piraeus
20:30 EEST	Pantelić 87'; Djebbour 90+4'	Report	Marcelinho 14'	Stadium: Karaiskakis Stadium; Attendance: 19,985; Referee: Michalis Voskakis

24 September 2011 4	Ergotelis	2–3	Olympiacos	Heraklion
19:30 EEST	Romano 55', 85'	Report	Mirallas 4'; Fuster 42' (pen.); Marcano 76'	Stadium: Pankritio; Attendance: 5,120; Referee: Andreas Pappas

2 October 2011 5	Olympiacos	2–1	PAOK	Neo Faliro, Piraeus
20:30 EEST	Fuster 34'; Djebbour 41'	Report	Balafas 25'	Stadium: Karaiskakis Stadium; Attendance: 28,772; Referee: Michael Koukoulakis

15 October 2011 6	AEK Athens	1–1	Olympiacos	Marousi, Athens
20:30 EEST	Leonardo 43'	Report	Mirallas 23'	Stadium: Olympic Stadium; Attendance: 18,611; Referee: Petros Konstantineas

23 October 2011 7	Panionios	0–3	Olympiacos	Nea Smyrni, Athens
18:15 EEST		Report	Djebbour 33', 68'; Mirallas 43'	Stadium: Nea Smyrni Stadium; Attendance: 3,567; Referee: Ilias Spathas

29 October 2011 8	Olympiacos	2–2	OFI	Neo Faliro, Piraeus
19:30 EEST	Djebbour 45'; Mirallas 62'	Report	Mantzios 73'; Georgiou 77'	Stadium: Karaiskakis Stadium; Attendance: 20,811; Referee: Spyros Selimos

5 November 2011 9	Aris	2–3	Olympiacos	Thessaloniki
EET	Toja 76'; Faty 84'	Report	Djebbour 7'; Modesto 28'; Makoun 83'	Stadium: Kleanthis Vikelidis; Attendance: 7,776; Referee: Anastasios Sidiropoulos

19 November 2011 10	Olympiacos	1–1	Panathinaikos	Neo Faliro, Piraeus
EET	Djebbour 47'	Report	Zeca 16'	Stadium: Karaiskakis Stadium; Attendance: 31,553; Referee: Athanasios Giachos

27 November 2011 11	Asteras Tripolis	2–0	Olympiacos	Tripoli
19:30 EET	Rogério 42' (pen.); Perrone 70'	Report		Stadium: Asteras Tripolis Stadium; Attendance: 6,150; Referee: Dimitris Kyrkos

3 December 2011 12	Olympiacos	2–0	Panetolikos	Neo Faliro, Piraeus
19:30 EET	Pantelić 61' (pen.); Djebbour 74'	Report		Stadium: Karaiskakis Stadium; Attendance: 21,203; Referee: Andreas Pappas

11 December 2011 13	Kerkyra	0–4	Olympiacos	Corfu
19:30 EET		Report	Pantelić 10', 18', 29', 63'	Stadium: Kerkyra Stadium; Attendance: 1,719; Referee: Giorgos Daskalopoulos

18 December 2011 14	Olympiacos	2–0	PAS Giannina	Neo Faliro, Piraeus
19:30 EET	Fuster 9'; Djebbour 43'	Report		Stadium: Karaiskakis Stadium; Attendance: 20,915; Referee: Dimitris Styliaras

4 January 2012 15	Olympiacos	1–0	Atromitos	Neo Faliro, Piraeus
19:30 EET	Marcano 53'	Report		Stadium: Karaiskakis Stadium; Attendance: 23,501; Referee: Giannis Delfakis

8 January 2012 16	Doxa Drama	0–0	Olympiacos	Thessaloniki
19:30 EET		Report		Stadium: Kaftanzoglio; Attendance: 841; Referee: A. Papapetrou

14 January 2012 17	Olympiacos	3–1	Levadiakos	Neo Faliro, Piraeus
19:30 EET	Korbos 41' (o.g.); Mirallas 44', 66'	Report	Napoleoni 65'	Stadium: Karaiskakis Stadium; Attendance: 14,372; Referee: Giorgos Daskalopoulos

22 January 2012 18	Skoda Xanthi	1–0	Olympiacos	Pigadia, Xanthi
17:15 EET	Vlachodimos 52'	Report		Stadium: Skoda Xanthi Arena; Attendance: 2,682; Referee: Petros Konstantineas

28 January 2012 19	Olympiacos	3–0	Ergotelis	Neo Faliro, Piraeus
19:30 EET	Pantelić 58'; Mellberg 65'; Fetfatzidis 90'	Report		Stadium: Karaiskakis Stadium; Attendance: 15,030; Referee: Anastasios Kakos

5 February 2012 20	PAOK	0–2	Olympiacos	Toumba, Thessaloniki
19:30 EET		Report	Abdoun 5'; Mirallas 18'	Stadium: Toumba Stadium; Attendance: 18,299; Referee: Athanasios Giachos

10 February 2012 21	Olympiacos	2–0	AEK Athens	Neo Faliro, Piraeus
21:00 EET	Mellberg 5'; Mirallas 24'	Report		Stadium: Karaiskakis Stadium; Attendance: 28,057; Referee: Andreas Pappas

19 February 2012 22	Olympiacos	2–0	Panionios	Neo Faliro, Piraeus
17:15 EET	Makoun 41'; Diogo 50'	Report		Stadium: Karaiskakis Stadium; Attendance: 18,173; Referee: Giannis Delfakis

3 March 2012 23	OFI	0–2	Olympiacos	Heraklion
17:15 EET		Report	Holebas 45'; Kazim-Richards 54'	Stadium: Theodoros Vardinogiannis; Attendance: 5,041; Referee: Andreas Pappas

11 March 2012 24	Olympiacos	3–0	Aris	Neo Faliro, Piraeus
17:15 EET	Marcano 18'; Holebas 45+3' (pen.); Mirallas 69'	Report		Stadium: Karaiskakis Stadium; Attendance: 21,221; Referee: Athanasios Giachos

18 March 2012 25	Panathinaikos	0–3 ^{1}	Olympiacos	Maroussi, Athens
19:30 EET		Report	Abdoun 51'	Stadium: Olympic Stadium; Attendance: - Referee: Anastasios Kakos

25 March 2012 26	Olympiacos	7–2	Asteras Tripolis	Neo Faliro, Piraeus
19:30 EEST	Mirallas 20' (pen.), 51', 70', 89'; Djebbour 49'; Orbaiz 53'; Fuster 80'	Report	Navarro 13'; Martins 16'	Stadium: Karaiskakis Stadium; Attendance: 18,874; Referee: Michalis Voskakis

1 April 2012 27	Panetolikos	0–1	Olympiacos	Agrinio
19:00 EEST		Report	Mirallas 54'	Stadium: Panetolikos Stadium; Attendance: 5,964; Referee: Michael Koukoulakis

8 April 2012 28	Olympiacos	0–1	Kerkyra	Neo Faliro, Piraeus
19:00 EEST		Report	Ioannou 80'	Stadium: Karaiskakis Stadium; Attendance: 25,296; Referee: Praxitelis Zachariadis

18 April 2012 29	PAS Giannina	0–4	Olympiacos	Ioannina
19:00 EEST		Report	Mirallas 53'; Djebbour 64', 71'; Fetfatzidis 75'	Stadium: Zosimades; Attendance: 5,198; Referee: Alexandros Dimitropoulos

22 April 2012 30	Atromitos	0–2	Olympiacos	Peristeri, Athens
EEST		Report	Marcano 61'; Fetfatzidis 66'	Stadium: Peristeri Stadium; Attendance: 2,011; Referee: Michalis Voskakis

^{1} Match awarded 0-3 by FA decision following severe crowd violence during the match.

=== Greek Cup ===
21 December 2011 Fourth round	Pierikos	1–3	Olympiacos	Katerini
17:00 (EET)	Eleftheriadis 36'	Report	Pantelić 33' (pen.), 44'; Abdoun 70'	Stadium: 1st Olympic Athletic Center of Katerini; Referee: Aristomenis Koutsiaftis (Arta)

11 January 2012 Fifth round	Olympiacos	3–0	Thrasyvoulos	Neo Faliro, Piraeus
19:00 (EET)	Pantelić 10', 56'; Fuster 21'	Report		Stadium: Karaiskakis Stadium; Referee: Georgios Kominis (Thesprotia)

25 January 2012 Quarter-finals	Olympiacos	4–0	Panionios	Neo Faliro, Piraeus
20:00 (EET)	Pantelić 11', 65'; Diogo 78'; Abdoun 87'	Report		Stadium: Karaiskakis Stadium; Referee: Alexandros Aretopoulos (Trikala)

21 March 2012 Semi-finals; First leg	Olympiacos	1–0	OFI	Neo Faliro, Piraeus
19:30 EET	Melberg 81'	Report		Stadium: Karaiskakis Stadium; Attendance: n/a Referee: Athanasios Giachos (Chios)

4 April 2012 Semi-finals; Second leg	OFI	0–0 (0–1 agg.)	Olympiacos	Heraklion
19:00 EEST		Report		Stadium: Theodoros Vardinogiannis; Attendance: n/a Referee: Ilias Spathas (Piraeus)

28 April 2012 Final	Atromitos	1–2 (a.e.t.)	Olympiacos	Maroussi, Athens
20:30 EEST	Iglesias 75'	Report	Djebbour 29'; Fuster 119'	Stadium: Olympic Stadium; Attendance: 41,500; Referee: Ilias Spathas (Piraeus)

=== UEFA Champions League ===
==== Group stage ====
Group F

Pos	Team	Pld	W	D	L	GF	GA	GD	Pts	Qualification
1	(England) Arsenal	6	3	2	1	7	6	+1	11	Advance to knockout phase
2	(France) Marseille	6	3	1	2	7	4	+3	10	Advance to knockout phase
3	(Greece) Olympiacos	6	3	0	3	8	6	+2	9	Transfer to Europa League
4	(Germany) Borussia Dortmund	6	1	1	4	6	12	−6	4	

Source: Soccerway

13 September 2011 1	Olympiacos (Greece)	0–1	(France) Marseille	Piraeus, Greece
20:45 CEST		Report	Lucho 51'	Stadium: Karaiskakis Stadium; Attendance: 30,040; Referee: Pedro Proença (Portugal)

28 September 2011 2	Arsenal (England)	2–1	(Greece) Olympiacos	London, England
20:45 CEST	Chamberlain 8'; Santos 20'	Report	Fuster 27'	Stadium: Emirates Stadium; Attendance: 59,676; Referee: Carlos Velasco Carballo (Spain)

19 October 2011 3	Olympiacos (Greece)	3–1	(Germany) Borussia Dortmund	Piraeus, Greece
20:45 CEST	Holebas 8'; Djebbour 40'; Modesto 78'	Report	Lewandowski 26'	Stadium: Karaiskakis Stadium; Attendance: 29,638; Referee: Bas Nijhuis (Netherlands)

1 November 2011 4	Borussia Dortmund (Germany)	1–0	(Greece) Olympiacos	Dortmund, Germany
20:45 CET	Großkreutz 7'	Report		Stadium: Signal Iduna Park; Attendance: 65,590; Referee: Vladislav Bezborodov (Russia)

23 November 2011 5	Marseille (France)	0–1	(Greece) Olympiacos	Marseille, France
20:45 CET		Report	Fetfatzidis 82'	Stadium: Stade Vélodrome; Attendance: 59,531; Referee: Nicola Rizzoli (Italy)

6 December 2011 6	Olympiacos (Greece)	3–1	(England) Arsenal	Piraeus, Greece
20:45 CET	Djebbour 16'; Fuster 36'; Modesto 89'	Report	Benayoun 57'	Stadium: Karaiskakis Stadium; Attendance: 30,816; Referee: Alberto Undiano Mallenco (Spain)

=== UEFA Europa League ===
==== Knockout phase ====
===== Round of 32 =====
14 February 2012 First leg	Rubin Kazan (Russia)	0–1	(Greece) Olympiacos	Moscow, Russia
12:00 CET		Report	Fuster 71'	Stadium: Luzhniki Stadium; Attendance: 1,741; Referee: Milorad Mažić (Serbia)

23 February 2012 Second leg	Olympiacos (Greece)	1–0 (2–0 agg.)	(Russia) Rubin Kazan	Piraeus, Greece
21:05 CET	Djebbour 14'	Report		Stadium: Karaiskakis Stadium; Attendance: 30,000; Referee: Stefan Johannesson (Sweden)

===== Round of 16 =====
8 March 2012 First leg	Metalist Kharkiv (Ukraine)	0–1	(Greece) Olympiacos	Kharkiv, Ukraine
19:00 CET		Report	Fuster 50'	Stadium: Metalist Stadium; Attendance: 35,136; Referee: István Vad (Hungary)

15 March 2012 Second leg	Olympiacos (Greece)	1–2 (2–2a agg.)	(Ukraine) Metalist Kharkiv	Piraeus, Greece
21:05 CET	Marcano 15'	Report	Villagra 81'; Dević 86'	Stadium: Karaiskakis Stadium; Attendance: 30,077; Referee: Ovidiu Hațegan (Romania)

== Team kit ==
Home	Away	Third	Fourth	Friendlies

== Individual Awards ==
Name	Pos.	Award
(Belgium) Kevin Mirallas	Winger	Super League Greece Player of the Season; Super League Greece Best Foreign Player; Super League Greece Golden Boot
(Spain) Ernesto Valverde	Manager	Super League Greece Manager of the Season
