= 2010–11 Olympiacos F.C. season =

Olympiacos
2010–11 season
- Chairman: Evangelos Marinakis
- Manager: Ewald Lienen until 6 August 2010; Ernesto Valverde from 8 August 2010
- Stadium: Karaiskakis Stadium, Piraeus
- Super League Greece: 1st (champions)
- Greek Cup: Quarter-finals
- Europa League: Third qualifying round
- Top goalscorer: League: Kevin Mirallas (14); All: Kevin Mirallas (14)
- Average home league attendance: 25,498
Home colours	Away colours	Third colours

The 2010–11 season was Olympiacos's 52nd consecutive season in the Super League Greece and their 85th year in existence.

The season was marked by the return of Ernesto Valverde as head coach. Varverde took charge of the team about mid August after the club's failure to qualify to 2010–11 UEFA Europa League group stage.

Olympiacos finished first in the Greek Super League, winning the title after an unsuccessful 2009–10 season. This was Evangelos Marinakis' first season as chairman of the club.

== Events ==
- 14.06.10: Ewald Lienen is appointed as the new Olympiacos manager replacing Božidar Bandović, after a disappointing season under Bandović.
- 21.06.10: Olympiacos enter the draw for the second qualifying round of the 2010–11 UEFA Europa League as the top seeded team and they are drawn to play against Besa of Albania. It is the first time that Olympiacos play directly in the UEFA Europa League after 13 consecutive seasons in the UEFA Champions League.
- 15.07.10: Olympiacos smash Besa 5–0 at the Qemal Stafa Stadium in Tirana, Albania, in the first leg of the second qualifying round of the 2010–11 UEFA Europa League, achieving their biggest away win in European competitions.
- 16.07.10: In the draw for the third qualifying round of the 2010–11 UEFA Europa League, Olympiacos are drawn to play the winners of the encounter between Maccabi Tel Aviv and Mogren.
- 22.07.10: In the second leg, Olympiacos trounce Besa 6–1 at the Karaiskakis Stadium, setting a new club record for their biggest ever European home win, with their previous record being 5–0. They qualify for the next round of the tournament with an 11–1 win on aggregate, which is also a record aggregate score for a Greek football club in European competitions.
- 05.08.10: Olympiacos are eliminated from the UEFA Europa League in the third qualifying round on away goals as the aggregate score is 2–2 against Maccabi Tel Aviv. A 2–1 win at the Karaiskakis Stadium in the first leg on 29.07.10 is compounded by a 1–0 loss at the Bloomfield Stadium in Tel Aviv, Israel, to secure the biggest surprise in the qualifyings.
- 06.08.10: Olympiacos sack coach Ewald Lienen after the club's shocking elimination from the UEFA Europa League.
- 07.08.10: Olympiacos reappoint Ernesto Valverde as manager.

== Players ==
=== First-team squad ===
Squad at end of season

Note: Flags indicate national team as defined under FIFA eligibility rules; some limited exceptions apply. Players may hold more than one non-FIFA nationality.

No.	Pos.	Nation	Player
1	GK	GRE	Nikolaos Papadopoulos
2	DF	GRE	Giannis Maniatis
3	DF	FRA	François Modesto
4	DF	SWE	Olof Mellberg
5	DF	GRE	Georgios Galitsios
6	FW	ESP	Óscar
7	MF	ARG	Ariel Ibagaza
8	MF	BRA	Dudu Cearense
9	FW	SRB	Marko Pantelić
10	FW	ALG	Rafik Djebbour
11	MF	MAR	Jaouad Zairi
14	FW	BEL	Kevin Mirallas
18	MF	GRE	Ioannis Fetfatzidis
19	MF	ESP	David Fuster
20	DF	GER	José Holebas

No.	Pos.	Nation	Player
21	DF	GRE	Avraam Papadopoulos (Captain)
22	FW	GRE	Kostas Mitroglou
23	MF	GRE	Georgios Niklitsiotis
24	MF	DEN	Dennis Rommedahl
29	FW	HUN	Krisztián Németh
30	MF	ESP	Moisés Hurtado
33	MF	GRE	Giannis Papadopoulos
35	DF	GRE	Vasilis Torosidis
42	GK	HUN	Balázs Megyeri
77	MF	ESP	Albert Riera
78	GK	ESP	Urko Rafael Pardo
81	DF	GRE	Georgios Valerianos
87	FW	BRA	Diogo
88	MF	GRE	Georgios Katsikogiannis
92	DF	GRE	Ioannis Potouridis

== Transfers ==
=== Summer ===
In: Note: Flags indicate national team as defined under FIFA eligibility rules; some limited exceptions apply. Players may hold more than one non-FIFA nationality.

No.	Pos.	Nation	Player
—	DF	FRA	François Modesto (from Monaco)
—	MF	ARG	Ariel Ibagaza (from Villarreal)
—	FW	BEL	Kevin Mirallas (from Saint-Étienne)
—	DF	GRE	José Holebas (from 1860 München)
—	MF	DEN	Dennis Rommedahl (from Ajax)
—	GK	HUN	Balázs Megyeri (from Ferencváros)
—	MF	ESP	Albert Riera (from Liverpool)
—	MF	GER	Denis Epstein (from Iraklis)
—	MF	ESP	David Fuster (from Villarreal)
—	FW	HUN	Krisztián Németh (from Liverpool)
—	FW	SRB	Marko Pantelić (from Ajax)
—	MF	ESP	Moisés Hurtado (from Espanyol)

Out: Note: Flags indicate national team as defined under FIFA eligibility rules; some limited exceptions apply. Players may hold more than one non-FIFA nationality.

No.	Pos.	Nation	Player
1	GK	GRE	Leonidas Panagopoulos (free transfer to Panionios)
2	DF	GRE	Kyriakos Papadopoulos (to Schalke 04 for €2.5M)
3	DF	FRA	Didier Domi (released)
6	MF	GRE	Ieroklis Stoltidis (free transfer to Kerkyra)
7	MF	ARG	Luciano Galletti (retired)
14	DF	POL	Michał Żewłakow (free transfer to Ankaragücü)
19	MF	ARG	Jesús Dátolo (loan return to Napoli)
24	DF	BRA	Leonardo (on loan to Internacional for €0.25M)
28	MF	ARG	Cristian Ledesma (free transfer to Colón Santa Fe)
30	DF	GRE	Anastasios Pantos (free transfer to PAS Giannina)
32	FW	COD	Lomana LuaLua (free transfer to Omonoia)
50	GK	SVK	Pavel Kováč (free transfer to Kavala)
—	MF	GER	Denis Epstein (on loan to Kerkyra)
—	FW	ENG	Matt Derbyshire (on loan to Birmingham City)
—	FW	BRA	Diogo (on loan to Flamengo)
—	MF	ITA	Enzo Maresca

== Competitions ==
=== Super League ===
==== League table ====
Pos	Team	Pld	W	D	L	GF	GA	GD	Pts	Qualification or relegation
1	Olympiacos (C)	30	24	1	5	65	18	+47	73	Qualification for the Champions League group stage
2	Panathinaikos	30	18	6	6	47	26	+21	60	Qualification for the Play-offs
3	AEK Athens	30	15	5	10	46	37	+9	50	Qualification for the Play-offs
4	PAOK	30	14	6	10	32	29	+3	48	Qualification for the Play-offs
5	Olympiacos Volos (Note: On 28 July 2011, the Disciplinary Committee of the competition found Olympiacos Volos and Kavala guilty of match-fixing. Therefore the clubs were automatically put at the end of the league table and demoted to the Football League. The decision, however, was lifted on 10 August 2011 after both appealed. Instead of that Olympiacos Volos had 10 points deducted and Kavala 8 for the 2011-2012 season. On 23 August 2011, the Professional Sports Committee stripped Kavala and Olympiacos Volos of their professional licence, due to their chairmen's involvement in the match fixing scandal.) (D)	30	12	11	7	40	28	+12	47	Play-offs and relegation to the Delta Ethniki

Source: Super League Greece
Rules for classification: 1) Points; 2) Head-to-head points; 3) Head-to-head goal difference; 4) Play-offs (neutral ground); 7) Draw.
(Note: Criterion 4 is only used if needed to decide champion, teams for relegation or teams for UEFA competitions).
(C) Champions; (D) Disqualified

==== Results summary ====
Overall								Home						Away					
Pld	W	D	L	GF	GA	GD	Pts	W	D	L	GF	GA	GD	W	D	L	GF	GA	GD
30	24	1	5	65	18	+47	73	15	0	0	46	6	+40	9	1	5	19	12	+7

Last updated: 18 April 2011.
Source: Competitive Matches

==== Results by round ====
Round	1	2	3	4	5	6	7	8	9	10	11	12	13	14	15	16	17	18	19	20	21	22	23	24	25	26	27	28	29	30
Ground	A	H	A	H	H	A	H	A	H	A	H	A	A	H	A	H	A	H	A	A	H	A	H	A	H	A	H	H	A	H
Result	L	W	W	W	W	W	W	L	W	W	W	L	W	W	W	W	W	W	W	W	W	W	W	D	W	L	W	W	L	W
Position	12	6	2	1	1	1	1	1	1	1	1	1	1	1	1	1	1	1	1	1	1	1	1	1	1	1	1	1	1	1

Source: superleaguegreece.net
A = Away; H = Home; W = Win; D = Draw; L = Loss

==== Matches ====
All times at EET

28 August 2010 1	Iraklis	2–1	Olympiacos	Thessaloniki
	Mara 79' (pen.); Vellios 86'	Report	Mitroglou 59'	Stadium: Kaftanzoglio Stadium; Attendance: 10,752

11 September 2010 2	Olympiacos	2–0	Kerkyra	Piraeus
17:15	Mellberg 29'; Riera 86'	Report		Stadium: Karaiskakis Stadium; Attendance: 0 (due to ban); Referee: Athanasios Giahos

19 September 2010 3	Panserraikos	0–1	Olympiacos	Serres
18:15		Report	Pantelić 32'	Stadium: Serres Municipal Stadium; Attendance: 5,214; Referee: Anastasios Sidiropoulos

25 September 2010 4	Olympiacos	3–0	Asteras Tripolis	Piraeus
19:30	Pantelić 36'; Fuster 62'; Fitanidis 72' (o.g.)	Report		Stadium: Karaiskakis Stadium; Attendance: 25,090; Referee: Vassilis Paboridis

2 October 2010 5	Olympiacos	3–1	Olympiacos Volos	Piraeus
20:30	Torosidis 7'; Mirallas 21', 90+1'	Report	Umbides 71'	Stadium: Karaiskakis Stadium; Attendance: 27,605; Referee: Georgios Stathopoulos

16 October 2010 6	Skoda Xanthi	0–3	Olympiacos	Xanthi
19:30		Report	Riera 16'; Torosidis 53'; Fetfatzidis 75'	Stadium: Skoda Xanthi Arena; Attendance: 2,221; Referee: Ilias Spathas

24 October 2010 7	Olympiacos	1–0	Aris	Piraeus
20:30	Riera 2'	Report		Stadium: Karaiskakis Stadium; Attendance: 30,099; Referee: Christos Mitsios

30 October 2010 8	Panathinaikos	2–1	Olympiacos	Athens
19:30	Cissé 57', 63'	Report	Mirallas 37'	Stadium: Athens Olympic Stadium; Attendance: 52,300; Referee: Anastasios Kakos

6 November 2010 9	Olympiacos	5–0	Panionios	Piraeus
19:30	Mirallas 34', 68'; Torosidis 51'; Pantelić 78'; Riera 90+3'	Report		Stadium: Karaiskakis Stadium; Attendance: 22,312; Referee: Petros Konstantineas

13 November 2010 10	Ergotelis	0–2	Olympiacos	Heraklion
17:15		Report	Pantelić 78'; Fuster 90+5'	Stadium: Pankritio Stadium; Attendance: 5,302; Referee: Athanasios Giahos

21 November 2010 11	Olympiacos	3–0	PAOK	Piraeus
19:30	Mirallas 37', 72'; Rommedahl 87'	Report		Stadium: Karaiskakis Stadium; Attendance: 30,275; Referee: Vassilis Paboridis
Note: not completed

27 November 2010 12	AEK Athens	1–0	Olympiacos	Athens
19:30	Blanco 90'	Report		Stadium: Athens Olympic Stadium; Attendance: 24,980; Referee: Anastasios Sidiropoulos

5 December 2010 13	Kavala	0–1	Olympiacos	Kavala
19:30		Report	Fuster 41' (pen.)	Stadium: Anthi Karagianni Stadium; Attendance: 4,175; Referee: Dimitrios Kalopoulos

12 December 2010 14	Olympiacos	2–1	Atromitos	Piraeus
17:15	Fuster 34' (pen.); Mirallas 36'	Report	Favalli 90+3'	Stadium: Karaiskakis Stadium; Attendance: 20,015; Referee: Dimitrios Thanos

19 December 2010 15	AEL	0–1	Olympiacos	Larisa
19:30		Report	Katsiaros 29' (o.g.)	Stadium: AEL FC Arena; Attendance: 10,855; Referee: Ilias Spathas

5 January 2011 16	Olympiacos	2–0	Iraklis	Piraeus
19:30	Fuster 32'; Pantelić 83'	Report		Stadium: Karaiskakis Stadium; Attendance: 25,117; Referee: Petros Konstantineas

9 January 2011 17	Kerkyra	0–2	Olympiacos	Kerkyra
19:30		Report	Tsigas 55' (o.g.); Mirallas 70'	Stadium: Kerkyra Stadium; Attendance: 1,579; Referee: Andreas Pappas

16 January 2011 18	Olympiacos	4–2	Panserraikos	Piraeus
17:15	Pantelić 52', 85'; Riera 70', 89'	Report	Georgiadis 65', 67'	Stadium: Karaiskakis Stadium; Attendance: 21,190; Referee: Nathaniel Charalambidis

23 January 2011 19	Asteras Tripolis	0–1	Olympiacos	Tripoli
17:15		Report	Fuster 30' (pen.)	Stadium: Asteras Tripolis Stadium; Attendance: 5,255; Referee: Michael Koukoulakis

31 January 2011 20	Olympiacos Volos	0–1	Olympiacos	Volos
17:15		Report	Fuster 19'	Stadium: Panthessaliko Stadium; Attendance: 14,757; Referee: Dimitrios Kalopoulos

6 February 2011 21	Olympiacos	1–0	Skoda Xanthi	Piraeus
15:00	Adefemi 45' (o.g.)	Report		Stadium: Karaiskakis Stadium; Attendance: 20,093; Referee: Alexandros Aretopoulos

12 February 2011 22	Aris	1–2	Olympiacos	Thessaloniki
19:30	Neto 17'	Report	Djebbour 39'; Fuster 75'	Stadium: Kleanthis Vikelidis Stadium; Attendance: 11,939; Referee: Anastasios Sidiropoulos

19 February 2011 23	Olympiacos	2–1	Panathinaikos	Piraeus
19:30	Mirallas 20'; Djebbour 90+2'	Report	Leto 58'	Stadium: Karaiskakis Stadium; Attendance: 30,845; Referee: Dimitrios Kalopoulos

27 February 2011 24	Panionios	1–1	Olympiacos	Athens
19:30	Svěrkoš 68'	Report	Mirallas 43'	Stadium: Nea Smyrni Stadium; Attendance: 3,388; Referee: Vassilis Paboridis

6 March 2011 25	Olympiacos	3–0	Ergotelis	Piraeus
15:00	Modesto 47'; Pantelić 58'; Mirallas 65'	Report		Stadium: Karaiskakis Stadium; Attendance: 0(due to ban); Referee: Christos Mitsios

13 March 2011 26	PAOK	2–1	Olympiacos	Thessaloniki
19:30	Koutsianikoulis 45'; Vitolo 71' (pen.)	Report	Djebbour 12'	Stadium: Toumba Stadium; Attendance: 20,023; Referee: Petros Konstantineas

20 March 2011 27	Olympiacos	6–0	AEK Athens	Piraeus
19:00	Djebbour 2', 61'; Mellberg 7'; Fuster 19'; Mirallas 68'; Holebas 71'	Report		Stadium: Karaiskakis Stadium; Attendance: 27,880; Referee: Vassilis Paboridis

3 April 2011 28	Olympiacos	3–1	Kavala	Piraeus
19:00	Fuster 58'; Djebbour 65'; Mirallas 67'	Report	Niculae 63'	Stadium: Karaiskakis Stadium; Attendance: 19,704; Referee: Anastasios Sidiropoulos

10 April 2011 29	Atromitos	3–1	Olympiacos	Athens
19:00	Sfakianakis 22'; Anastasakos 37'; Camara 53'	Report	Modesto 34'	Stadium: Peristeri Stadium; Attendance: 3,313; Referee: Vassilis Paboridis

18 April 2011 30	Olympiacos	6–0	AEL	Piraeus
19:00	Djebbour 7'; Fuster 15', 17'; Mellberg 62'; Pantelić 65'; Fetfatzidis 76'	Report		Stadium: Karaiskakis Stadium; Attendance: 31,256; Referee: Praxitelis Zachariadis

==== Goalscorers ====
This is the list of goalscorers in accordance with Super League Greece as organising body.

Position	Player	Goals
1	(Belgium) Kevin Mirallas	14
2	(Algeria) Rafik Djebbour*	12
2	(Spain) David Fuster	12
3	(Serbia) Marko Pantelić	9
4	(Spain) Albert Riera	6
5	(Greece) Vasilis Torosidis	3
5	(Sweden) Olof Mellberg	3
7	(Greece) Giannis Fetfatzidis	2
7	(France) François Modesto	2
9	(Greece) Kostas Mitroglou	1
9	(Denmark) Dennis Rommedahl	1
9	(Greece) Giannis Maniatis*	1
9	(Germany) José Holebas	1

- Djebbour has scored 5 goals for AEK Athens and 7 for Olympiacos
- Maniatis has scored 1 goal for Panionios and 0 for Olympiacos
- Last updated:18 April 2011

=== Greek Cup ===
All times UTC+3

==== Fourth Round ====
3 November 2010	Ilioupoli	0–1	Olympiacos	Egaleo
17:00		Report	Pantelić 87'	Stadium: Stavros Mavrothalassitis Stadium; Attendance: - Referee: Dimitris Thanos (Grevena)

==== Fifth Round ====
22 December 2010	Asteras Tripolis	0–1	Olympiacos	Tripoli
17:30		Report	Ibagaza 86'	Stadium: Asteras Tripolis Stadium; Attendance: - Referee: Dimitris Kalopoulos (Macedonia)

==== Quarter-finals ====
19 January 2011	Olympiacos	1–1	PAOK	Piraeus
18:00	Modesto 45'	Report	Vieirinha 82'	Stadium: Georgios Karaiskakis; Attendance: 28,404; Referee: Stavros Tritsonis (Athens)

2 February 2011	PAOK	1–0 (2–1 agg.)	Olympiacos	Thessaloniki
18:00	Salpingidis 57'	Report		Stadium: Toumba Stadium; Attendance: 0 Referee: Stavros Mantalos (Athens)

=== UEFA Europa League ===
==== Second qualifying round ====
15 July 2010 First leg	Besa (Albania)	0–5	(Greece) Olympiacos	Tirana, Albania
21:30		Report	Óscar 19', 30'; Dudu 46'; Diogo 70', 84'	Stadium: Qemal Stafa Stadium; Attendance: 5,000; Referee: David Fernández Borbalán (Spain)

22 July 2010 Second leg	Olympiacos (Greece)	6–1 (11–1 agg.)	(Albania) Besa	Piraeus, Greece
21:30	Dudu 46', 79'; Derbyshire 53'; Maresca 75', 90'; Fetfatzidis 88'	Report	Lazarevski 48'	Stadium: Karaiskakis Stadium; Attendance: — Referee: Lee Probert (England)

==== Third qualifying round ====
29 July 2010 First leg	Olympiacos (Greece)	2–1	(Israel) Maccabi Tel Aviv	Piraeus, Greece
21:30	Zairi 67'; Rommedahl 73'	Report	Medunjanin 18' (pen.)	Stadium: Karaiskakis Stadium; Attendance: — Referee: Dougie McDonald (Scotland)

5 August 2010 Second leg	Maccabi Tel Aviv (Israel)	1–0 (2a–2 agg.)	(Greece) Olympiacos	Tel Aviv, Israel
21:00	Colautti 42'	Report		Stadium: Bloomfield Stadium; Attendance: 12,421; Referee: Luca Banti (Italy)

== Team kit ==
Home	Away	Third	Fourth

== Individual Awards ==
Name	Pos.	Award
(Argentina) Ariel Ibagaza	Attacking Midfielder	Super League Greece Player of the Season
(Greece) Avraam Papadopoulos	Centre-back	Super League Greece Greek Player of the Season
(Greece) Giannis Fetfatzidis	Winger	Super League Greece Young Player of the Season
(Spain) Ernesto Valverde	Manager	Super League Greece Manager of the Season
