= Rafik Djebbour =

Algerian footballer (born 1984)

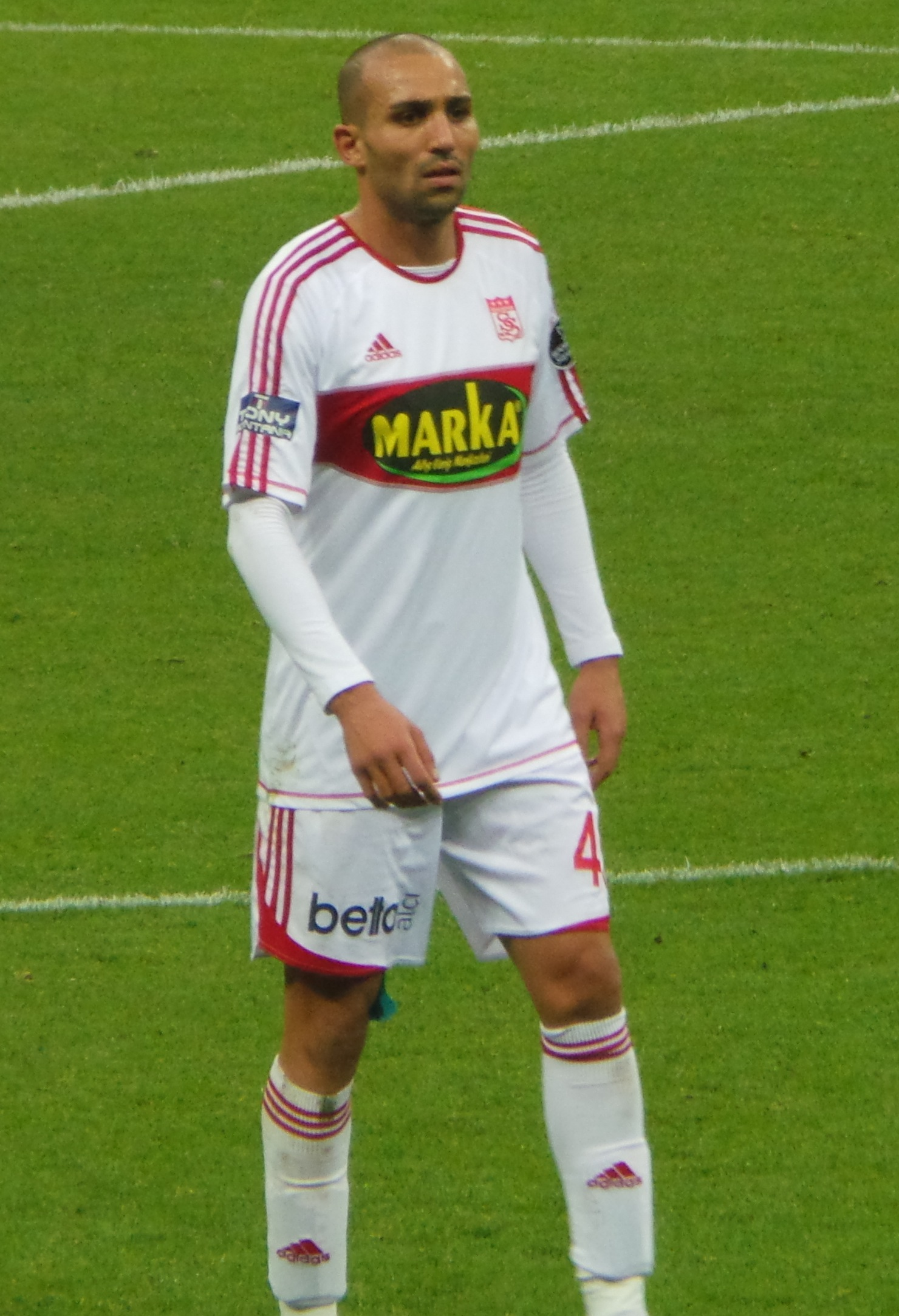
- Djebbour with Sivasspor in 2013

Personal information
- Full name: Rafik Zoheir Djebbour
- Date of birth: 8 March 1984 (age 42)
- Place of birth: Grenoble, France
- Height: 1.85 m (6 ft 1 in)
- Positions: Striker; winger

Youth career
- 1998–2003: Auxerre

Senior career*
Years	Team	Apps	(Gls)
2003–2004	Auxerre	14	(2)
2004–2005	La Louvière	21	(6)
2005–2006	Ethnikos Asteras	21	(6)
2006	Atromitos	14	(6)
2006–2008	Panionios	41	(19)
2008–2011	AEK Athens	58	(22)
2011–2014	Olympiacos	56	(39)
2013–2014	→ Sivasspor (loan)	10	(2)
2014	Nottingham Forest	7	(1)
2014–2015	APOEL	26	(14)
2015–2016	AEK Athens	22	(5)
2016–2017	Aris	5	(0)
2017–2018	Athlético Marseille	1	(0)
Total		296	(122)

International career
2006–2014	Algeria	39	(8)
- * Club domestic league appearances and goals

Rafik Zoheir Djebbour (Berber languages:ⵔⴰⴼⵉⴽ ⵣⵓⵀⴻⵉⵔ ⴷⵊⴻⴱⴱⵓⵔ,Arabic: رفيق جبور; born 8 March 1984) is a retired professional footballer who played as striker and winger. Born in France, he represented Algeria at international level.

== Club career ==
=== Auxerre ===
Born in Grenoble, France, Djebbour was signed to Auxerre's youth academy at the age of 15 in 1998. He was moved to the senior team in 2003 after spending five years in the youth academy. He made his professional debut at the age of 19.

=== Louviéroise ===
His impressive debut season caught the eye of R.A.A. Louviéroise. In his second professional season, he did not live up to his expectations. Even though he made 21 appearances he only managed to score six goals. Djebbour was transfer listed by the club at the end of the season, Djebbour mentioned in an interview that he was transfer listed as he was not happy with the way the club did not support him when his brother had been in a coma for five months, he stated he was very disappointed with the staff and became disillusioned and felt no attachment to the club. In July 2005, Djebbour signed for Greek outfit Ethnikos Asteras.

=== Ethnikos Asteras ===
In his first season in Greece, he scored 11 goals in 21 appearances from September to January. This earned him a move to Atromitos where he managed six goals until the end of the season.

=== Atromitos ===
Djebbour suffered a serious injury in his first season with Atromitos this limited Djebbour to only two appearances without scoring. In January 2006, Djebbour called upon one of the "big three" of Greece (AEK Athens, Olympiacos, Panathinaikos) to acquire his services, however this did not happen and he ended up at Panionios.

=== Panionios ===
Before signing to Panionios, Djebbour went on trial at English club Watford but was not retained as Aidy Boothroyd stated "He wasn't what I was looking for". His first six months with Panionios, Djebbour scored four goals in the remaining 14 games. He would go on to score 15 goals in 27 appearances. In the summer of 2008, AEK Athens expressed their interest in signing Djebbour. He completed his move to the yellow-blacks on 1 July 2008.

=== AEK Athens ===
In 2008, Djebbour transferred to AEK for €3.2 million. Djebbour scored his first goal for AEK in the 93rd minute in the home 2–1 win against Asteras Tripolis, giving his club the three points. Djebbour got into a fight with teammate Ignacio Scocco in a training ground bust-up. On 30 September 2009, it was reported that Djebbour clashed with the manager of AEK Athens, Dušan Bajević and was not allowed to train with the rest of the season for four months. During his absence from AEK Athens' training, Djebbour had been training with Celtic and Blackburn Rovers. On 7 September 2010, Djebbour signed a three-year deal keeping at the club until 2013. Djebbour's contract is worth €3.3 million with a buy-out clause of €7 million.

After signing his contract extension in 2010, he began the 2010 season in great form, scoring 3 goals in three games (2–1 loss to Kerkyra, 1–0 win against Panserraikos, and a 2–2 draw with Asteras Tripolis) for the regular season as well as a goal during AEK's 3–1 Europa League win against Hajduk Split.

On 2 January 2011, Djebbour had another clash, this time with Manolo Jimenez, the current AEK Athens coach. Jimenez reportedly stressed to Djebbour that he is not allowed to attend the next day training and that he should instead meet with the chairman of AEK Athens.

After the incidents with Manolo Jimenez, Djebbour requested immediately to be released on a free transfer by AEK. He also requested to be paid his remaining wages doubled. Lens and other French teams declared interest in buying him. Djebbour threatened AEK's board and was ready to seek a solution in court.

=== Olympiacos ===
==== 2010–11 ====
On 21 January 2011, Olympiacos bought Djebour from AEK Athens for €2.3 million. He signed a six-month contract with the club with the option of renewal for two years. He scored his first goal for Olympiacos in an away win at Aris after a superb assist of Ariel Ibagaza. That was followed by two goals in a 6–0 home win against AEK Athens, a goal against PAOK and the winning goal in a 2–1 derby win against Panathinaikos. He also scored in a home win 3–1 against Kavala after an assist of Giannis Maniatis and in the final match of the season, against AEL after a superb assist of Albert Riera.

==== 2011–12 ====
Djebbour scored his first goal of the season with a last-minute winner in a thrilling home win 2–1 against Skoda Xanthi. Rafik's goal of the season came at a home win 2–1 against PAOK with an sublime header after an assist of Kevin Mirallas. His first European goal for Olympiakos came in a Champions League home win (3–1) against Borussia Dortmund. In the domestic league, he scored two goals in a 3–0 away win against Panionios. He also scored in a home win 2–1 against PAOK. He scored a goal in a 2–2 home draw against OFI and a goal in a 1–1 home draw with Panathinaikos. He also scored in a 2–0 home win against Panetolikos. His second European goal came in a 3–1 home win against Arsenal in a Champions League home game. He also scored a goal in a 2–0 home win against PAS Giannina.

Djebbour scored a goal in a 7–2 home win against Asteras Tripoli. His third European goal of the season came in a 1–0 home win against Rubin Kazan in the Europa League. He also scored two goals in a 4–0 away win against PAS Giannina. Djebbour also scored in the Greek Cup Final in Olympiacos' win 2–1 against Atromitos.

In all competitions, Djebbour made 31 appearances, scoring 12 goals in the Greek Superleague and 16 goals in all competitions.

==== 2012–13 ====
Djebbour started the season with a goal in a 2–1 away win against Veria after an assist from José Holebas. He next scored two goals in a 4–0 home win against Levadiakos after assist of Djamel Abdoun. His next goal came in a 2–1 away win against PAS Giannina. At this match he made the assist to Kostas Mitroglou to score the second goal. He also scored two goals in a 4–1 home win against Panthrakikos after two assists of Abdoun and Ibagaza. He next scored two goals in a 4–0 home win against Skoda Xanthi. As a result of his outstanding performances the club offered Djebbour a better contract extension. He also scored in a 1–1 away draw against PAOK. The next goal came in a 2–0 home win against Panachaiki, with a wonderful header at a Greek Cup match. He next scored two goals in an away draw 2–2 at the classical Greek derby against Panathinaikos after two assists of Abdoun and David Fuster. These goals marked his 4th goal in the classic derby Olympiacos–Panathinaikos with Olympiacos team. He scored 10 goals against Panathinaikos at his charge at Greece and he intrigued illustrious European football clubs such as Olympique de Marseille. His next goal came in an away win 2–1 against Panionios after an assist of Kostas Mitroglou.

Djebbour finished the first half of Greek Superleague with 12 goals in 11 appearances.

At January transfer window Djebbour renew his contract with Olympiacos until 2016.

The second half of Greek Superleague begins with a goal in a 3–0 home win against Veria with a penalty shot. With this goal has already surpass his previous record with Olympiacos of 12 goals in Greek Superleague. He scored his next goal against Levadiakos in a 1–0 away win at the last minute of the game with a wonderful header, after an assist of Juan Pablo Pino. His next goal came in a home win 2–0 against Pas Giannina. With this goal he equaled his previous (last year) record of 16 goals in all competitions with the Olympiacos' shirt and his previous record of 15 goals at Greek Superleague with the Panionios shirt. His next goal came in a 3–2 home loss against Atromitos after an assist of Mitroglou. His next goal came in an away win 2–0 against Skoda Xanthi. With this goal he reached 18 goals in all competitions and broke his previous record of 17 goals in all competitions with Panionios shirt. His next goal came in a home win 2–1 against Aris after an assist from Holebas.

He next scores two goals in an away win 4–0 against OFI after an assist of Abdoun. With these two goals he reached 20 goals at 20 performances at Greek Superleague. At a home win against AEK Athens Djebbour did not score a goal but gave two assists to Abdoun and Avraam Papadopoulos. With that win Olympiacos claimed the 40th championship in its history. Djebbour made the assist to Mitroglou at a home draw 1–1 against Panathinaikos at the classical Greek derby.

He ended the season at Greek Superleague being the top scorer, scoring 20 goals in 24 appearances.

=== Loan to Sivasspor ===
On 6 September 2013, Djebbour joined Süper Lig club Sivasspor on a season-long loan deal from Olympiacos, after the interest of the coach of the club, Roberto Carlos. He played 13 games with the club in all competitions and scored 4 goals.

=== Nottingham Forest ===
Djebbour joined Nottingham Forest on 29 January 2014 for €1.5 million, initially on loan with the deal becoming permanent at the end of the season. Despite a debut goal, Djebbour, along with countryman Djamel Abdoun, was dropped by caretaker manager Gary Brazil due to a perceived lack of effort in training and bad attitude.

At the end of the season, Forest believed they could cancel the permanent transfer with his club Olympiacos, but were unable to. On 15 July 2014, it was confirmed Djebbour and Forest had reached an agreement to terminate his contract.

=== APOEL ===
On 5 August 2014, Djebbour signed a one-year contract with APOEL from Cyprus. He made his debut against Aalborg BK at GSP Stadium on 26 August 2014, in APOEL's 4–0 victory in the play-off round of the 2014–15 UEFA Champions League. Djebbour also appeared in five group stage matches. He scored his first goal for APOEL on 6 October 2014, netting the winner in his teams's 2–1 comeback win against Othellos in the Cypriot First Division. The next matchday, he scored for a second consecutive league match, netting again the winner in APOEL's 1–0 home win against Nea Salamina. On 15 December 2014, he scored twice in a 4–4 home draw against AEK Larnaca. On 11 March 2015, Djebbour came on as a 62nd-minute substitute and scored twice in APOEL's 2–0 home victory against Anorthosis in the quarter-finals of the Cypriot Cup. On 14 March 2015, he scored the equalizer in APOEL's 1–1 away draw against arch rivals Omonia in the First Division play-offs. On 2 May 2015, Djebbour scored a stoppage-time winner to give APOEL a dramatic 3–2 win against Omonia and helped his team to move five points clear at the top of the table, just three matches before the end. On 24 May 2015, Djebbour scored twice in the 4–2 victory against Ermis Aradippou and celebrated the double, as his team secured their third consecutive league title.

=== Return to AEK ===
On 17 June 2015, Djebbour signed a one-year contract with the option of a further season with AEK Athens, returning to his former club after four years.

He missed the start of the season and started training in November.

On 6 December 2015, in a home win against AEL Kalloni, he scored his first goal with AEK Athens after his return. At the semi-final of the Greek Cup against Atromitos he equalized an Eduardo Brito goal, by coming from the bench, helping the club to advance in the final targeting its first title after five years. On 17 May 2016, Djebbour scored to help his club win 2–1 against champions Olympiacos in the cup final at the Olympic Stadium of Athens and won the title for 15th time in their history.

=== Aris ===
On 7 September 2016 Djebour made the move to Aris on a 3-year contract. On 6 November 2016, the Algerian striker had a beef with his team's fans after disappointing home draw (1–1) against Aiginiakos F.C. at Thessaloniki. Οn 18 July 2017, the administration of Aris has decided to terminate the contract of experienced Algerian striker Rafik Zoheir Djebbour, a year after his signing.

=== Later years ===
On 3 October 2017 Djebbour signed a contract with GS Consolat, a team that plays at the Championnat National, making his return to France after 12 years.

== International career ==
He made his debut with the Algeria in an unofficial friendly game against Istres in August 2006 and his first official game was the following day against Gabon, which Algeria lost 0–2. He scored his first international goal against Liberia on 6 June 2008. He played a key role in Algeria's winning campaign to qualify for the 2010 FIFA World Cup and scored a crucial goal in Algeria's 3–1 victory over Egypt in June 2009. He also played at the 2010 FIFA World Cup in South Africa but failed to score.

== Career statistics ==
=== Club ===
Appearances and goals by club, season and competition
Club	Season	League			National cup (Note: Includes Belgian Cup, Greek Football Cup, Turkish Cup, FA Cup, Coupe de France)		Europe		Total	
Club	Season	Division	Apps	Goals	Apps	Goals	Apps	Goals	Apps	Goals
La Louvière	2004–05	Belgian Pro League	21	6	2	1	—		23	7
Ethnikos Asteras	2005–06	Beta Ethniki	21	11	2	1	—		23	12
Atromitos	2005–06	Alpha Ethniki	12	6	0	0	—		12	6
Atromitos	2006–07	Super League Greece	2	0	0	0	—		2	0
Atromitos	Total		14	6	0	0	—		14	6
Panionios	2006–07	Super League Greece	14	4	0	0	—		14	4
Panionios	2007–08	Super League Greece	27	15	0	0	6 (Note: Appearance(s) in UEFA Europa League)	2	33	17
Panionios	Total		41	19	0	0	6	2	47	21
AEK Athens	2008–09	Super League Greece	28	8	7	2	0	0	35	10
AEK Athens	2009–10	Super League Greece	19	6	0	0	1	0	20	6
AEK Athens	2010–11	Super League Greece	11	5	2	1	6	2	19	8
AEK Athens	Total		58	22	9	3	7	2	74	24
Olympiacos	2010–11	Super League Greece	10	7	1	0	—		11	7
Olympiacos	2011–12	Super League Greece	21	12	3	1	10 (Note: Six appearances and two goals in UEFA Champions League, four appearances and one goal in UEFA Europa League)	3	34	16
Olympiacos	2012–13	Super League Greece	25	20	5	2	6 (Note: Four appearances in UEFA Champions League, two appearances in UEFA Europa League)	0	36	22
Olympiacos	Total		56	39	9	3	16	3	81	45
Sivasspor (loan)	2013–14	Süper Lig	10	2	3	2	—		13	4
Nottingham Forest	2013–14	Championship	7	1	1	0	—		8	1
APOEL	2014–15	Cypriot First Division	26	14	6	3	6 (Note: Appearances in UEFA Champions League)	0	38	17
AEK Athens	2015–16	Super League Greece	22	2	9	3	—		31	5
Aris	2016–17	Super League Greece 2	5	0	0	0	—		5	0
Athlético Marseille	2017–18	Championnat National	1	0	1	0	—		2	0
Career total			282	122	42	16	35	7	359	142

=== International ===
Appearances and goals by national team and year
National team	Year	Apps	Goals
Algeria	2006	1	0
Algeria	2007	0	0
Algeria	2008	6	1
Algeria	2009	6	2
Algeria	2010	8	1
Algeria	2011	3	0
Algeria	2012	4	1
Algeria	2013	5	0
Algeria	2014	1	0
Total		33	5

Scores and results list Algeria's goal tally first, score column indicates score after each Djebbour goal.

List of international goals scored by Rafik Djebbour
No.	Date	Venue	Opponent	Score	Result	Competition
1	2008-06-06	Stade Mustapha Tchaker, Blida, Algeria	Liberia	1–0	3–0	2010 FIFA World Cup qualification
2	2009-06-07	Stade Mustapha Tchaker, Blida, Algeria	Egypt	3–0	3–1	2010 FIFA World Cup qualification
3	2009-08-12	Stade 5 Juillet 1962, Algiers, Algeria	Uruguay	1–0	1–0	Friendly
4	2010-08-11	Stade 5 Juillet 1962, Algiers, Algeria	Gabon	1–2	1–2	Friendly
5	2012-05-26	Stade Mustapha Tchaker, Blida, Algeria	Niger	2–0	3–0	Friendly

== Honours ==
Olympiacos

- Super League Greece: 2010–11, 2011–12, 2012–13
- Greek Cup: 2011–12, 2012–13

APOEL

- Cypriot First Division: 2014–15
- Cypriot Cup: 2014–15

AEK Athens

- Greek Cup: 2015–16

Individual

- Super League Greece Golden Boot: 2012–13 (20 goals)
