= Giannis Fetfatzidis =

Greek footballer (born 1990)

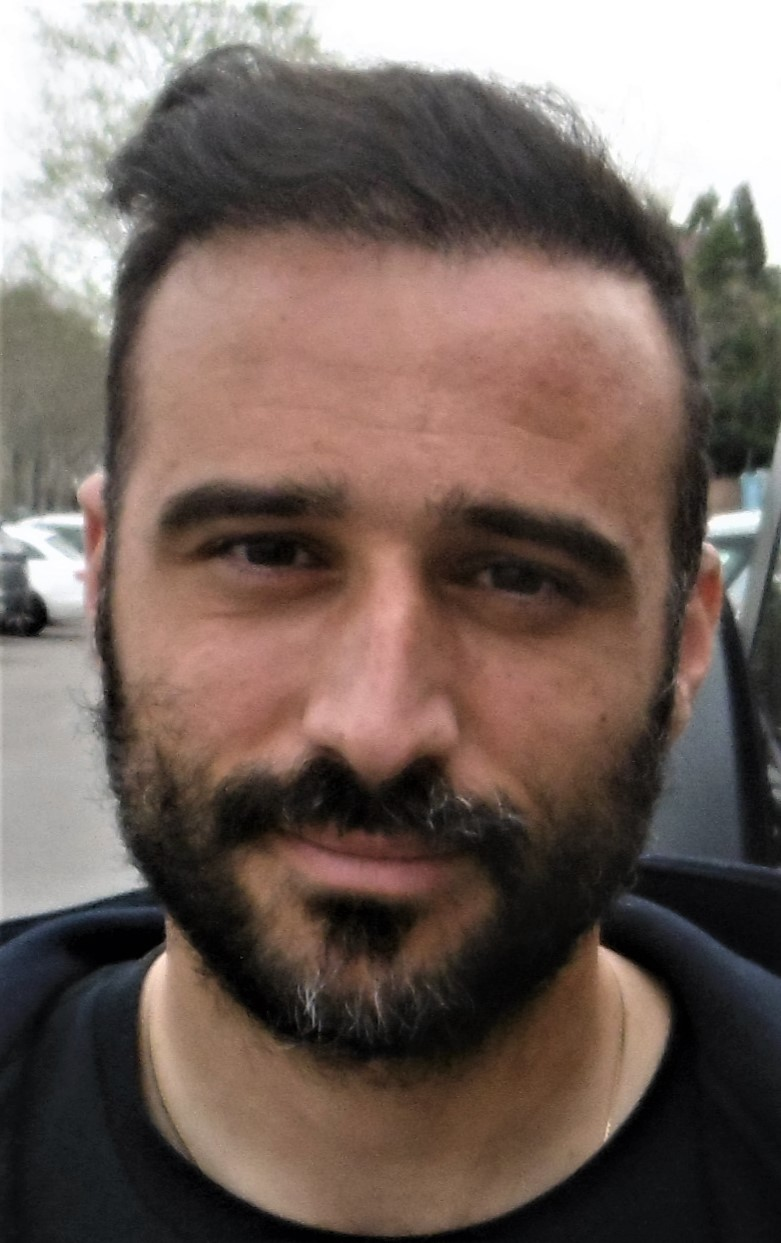
- Fetfatzidis in 2023

Personal information
- Full name: Ioannis Fetfatzidis
- Date of birth: 21 December 1990 (age 35)
- Place of birth: Drama, Greece
- Height: 1.68 m (5 ft 6 in)
- Position: Winger

Youth career
- 2003–2009: Olympiacos

Senior career*
Years	Team	Apps	(Gls)
2009–2013	Olympiacos	53	(5)
2013–2015	Genoa	36	(4)
2015	→ Chievo Verona (loan)	4	(0)
2015–2018	Al-Ahli	67	(15)
2018–2019	Olympiacos	9	(1)
2019–2020	Aris	45	(7)
2020–2022	Al-Khor	34	(9)
2022–2023	Al-Sailiya	7	(1)
2023	SPAL	13	(1)
2023–2024	APOEL	6	(0)
2024–2025	Aris	37	(3)
Total		311	(46)

International career^{‡}
2010–2011	Greece U21	4	(0)
2010–2019	Greece	27	(3)
- * Club domestic league appearances and goals as of 18 June 2025 ‡ National team caps and goals as of 16 November 2025

Giannis Fetfatzidis (Greek: Γιάννης Φετφατζίδης; born 21 December 1990) is a Greek former professional footballer who played as a winger and an attacking midfielder.

== Early years ==
Fetfatzidis began playing football in the Vouliagmeni academies at the age of six, at Sourmena FC s academy and senior (amateur) team. Aged 12 he was spotted by coach Kostas Arzenis of the Olympiacos Academies. Although there was competition from AEK Athens and Panathinaikos, he finally joined Olympiacos who helped him with his growth hormone treatment.

== Club career ==
=== Olympiacos ===
Fetfatzidis made his debut with Olympiacos in the Greek championship during the 2009–10 season, participating in the win against Atromitos on 31 October 2009. Manager Zico gave him his UEFA Champions League debut against Standard Liège on 4 November 2009 in Liège, Belgium, substituting Luciano Galletti in the 39th minute of play.

On 15 July 2010, in Tirana, Albania, he made his first appearance in the UEFA Europa League against Besa Kavajë, replacing Jaouad Zairi in the 75th minute. Fetfatzidis scored his first European goal in the home match against Besa Kavajë in Karaiskakis Stadium in a high-scoring victory for Olympiacos. The match ended 6–1. Fetfatzidis scored his first goal in the Greek Super League against Skoda Xanthi on 16 October 2010, replacing Dennis Rommedahl in the match. The match ended in a 0–3 victory for Olympiacos. His second goal was scored against AEL in the last match of the season.

In early September 2010, Olympiacos extended his contract until 2015, increasing his wages and putting a €12.5 million release clause on his contract. On 23 November 2011, Fetfatzidis gave Olympiacos a 1–0 victory over Olympique de Marseille in the Champions League by scoring in the 82nd minute at the Stade Vélodrome, placing them in third place in Group F.

Controversy followed the player in 2012. To everyone's surprise, despite helping Greece qualify for UEFA Euro 2012 with matching-winning qualifying goals, Fetfatzidis was quickly dropped from the first team when the tournament finally arrived and spent the whole competition on the bench. Bizarrely at Olympiacos during the same season, despite having better goal/minute and assist/minute ratios than first team wingers like Djamel Abdoun, Fetfatzidis found himself planted to the bench for most of the 2011–12 season.

To further confuse the issue, from the start of the 2012–13 season, despite an excellent 2012 pre-season, Fetfatzidis was again largely ignored at Olympiacos. The 2012–13 season proved a major disappointment as he was left out of Olympiacos' line-up regularly, clocking up just 12 league appearances. Despite that, the 22-year-old scored a sublime goal against Panthrakikos in the Greek Cup semi-finals, dribbling past five opponents along the way. This prompted questions from the media about why he was abandoned as a player, with Sakis Tsiolis and other competing clubs' managers openly questioning why he is not being played despite outshining his peers and drawing comparisons to Kyriakos Papadopoulos's treatment at Olympiacos years previous. Under Spanish coach Míchel, Fetfatzidis received more playing time at the club.

=== Genoa ===
In September 2013, Fetfatzidis joined Serie A club Genoa for a reported €4 million transfer fee which made him the most expensive Greek player to move out of the Super League. As part of deal Olympiacos secured a 25% sell-on clause while Fetfatzidis contract amounted to €400,000 per year.

He made his first appearance with the club on 21 September 2013 in a home 0–0 draw against Livorno as a substitute. On 26 March 2014, he scored his first goal with the club in 2–0 home win against Lazio. On 18 May 2014, Genoa have recorded a 1–0 win over Roma in last season's game for Serie A at the Stadio Luigi Ferraris. The Giallorossi got a number of chances to open the scoring, but were made to pay for their profligacy in front of goal by Giannis Fetfatzidis' winner. Genoa then went 1–0 up in the closing stages of the game against the run of play when Fetfatzidis found the goal with a calm finish.

On 15 January 2015, Fetfatzidis rescued Genoa by scoring two goals in a thriller game with Sassuolo as his club came from behind three times to deny Sassuolo a victory as their Serie A clash ended in a thrilling 3–3 draw.

On 31 January 2015, Chievo Verona took Fetfatzidis on loan from Genoa for the rest of the season.

=== Al-Ahli ===
On 30 July 2015, Fetfatzidis joined to Saudi Arabian club Al-Ahli signing a three-year contract. On 12 September 2015, Fetfatzidis playing against Hajer for the last 16 of the Crown Prince Cup he managed to score his first goal with the club, three minutes after his entrance in the 78th minute. At the end of the season he celebrated the Saudi Professional League. On 8 August was a starter in a 5–3 on penalties after a 1–1 draw in London Fulham's stadium Craven Cottage against Al-Hilal winning the Saudi Super Cup.

On 6 November 2016, Fetfatzidis scored his first goal of the 2016–17 season in a 4–0 home win against Al-Wehda. On 13 March 2017, he scored the second goal of his club giving a lead for a final 2–2 home draw against Al Ain in the AFC Champions League. On 12 May 2017, one month after the renewal of the contract with Al-Ahli, Fetfatzidis scored a goal which paved the way to qualifying for the final of the King Cup in a glorious 3–0 win against Al-Faisaly. On 17 August 2017, he scored his first goal for the 2017–18 season with a penalty kick in a 4–0 home win against Al-Fateh. He did not play in the quarter final of the AFC Champions League because his name was not included by the coach. Under Serhii Rebrov in 2017–18, he appeared in all 20 games of the league and scored 8 goals.

With Al-Ahli, Fetfatzidis scored 21 goals in 100 appearances in all competitions, adding also 29 assists to his name. In May 2018, it was announced Fetfatzidis would leave the club after his three-year contract expired.

=== Return to Olympiacos ===
On 30 May 2018, Fetfatzidis is set to make a return to Olympiacos after a five-year absence from the club. The Greek winger has agreed to terms with the Greek giants and is expected to put pen to paper in the next days on a new deal. Fetfatzidis will sign a three-year contract with annual earnings of €500,000. On 16 December 2018, Fetfatzidis netting in the first minute after half-time after Miguel Ángel Guerrero had flicked on a Kostas Fortounis cross. It was his first goal with the club in all competitions for the 2018–19 season, helping his club to acquire a 3–0 home win against Lamia.

=== Aris ===
On 2 February 2019, Aris announced the signing of the international winger on a contract until the end of the 2018–19 season for an undisclosed fee. On 18 March 2019, he scored his first goal sealing an emphatic 5–0 home win against Apollon Smyrnis.

On 1 July 2019, he signed a two-year contract renewal.

On 15 September 2019, in a home match against Panathinaikos, Fetfatzidis made his best performance as a player of Aris, scoring one goal and giving 2 assists, helping to a stunning 4–0 win. On 8 December 2019, Fetfatzidis, who was arguably the game's best player, scored an added time equaliser to cap a fine individual performance and secure a valuable 2–2 away draw for Aris against Atromitos.

On 9 January 2020, Aris turned down a huge offer, a sum believed to be around €2,000,000 from Al Wahda. On 2 February 2020, Fetfatzidis scored in a 2–0 home win game against Panionios, sealing a vital win in his club effort to be promoted for the Championship Round. On 26 June 2020, Al Ain submitted an official offer, around €1,700,000, which Aris accepted. The 30-year-old winger who has emerged as a key player for his team, recording 3 goals and 11 assists, will increase his bank account by €5,000,000 in the next three years. However, due to the terms alteration by Al Ain, concerning the transfer fee and Fetfatzidis' wage, the deal fell off and the Greek winger will remain in Thessaloniki.

In his first two matches, following his return, he scored in a 4–2 home defeat against Olympiacos and in a 1–0 away win against OFI.

=== Al-Khor SC ===
On 29 September 2020, Fetfatzidis joined Al-Khor SC a Qatari professional sports club for a transfer fee of €1.1 million. His contract, which ran until 2023, was worth €1.5 million per year.

=== SPAL ===
On 22 January 2023, Fetfatzidis signed a 1.5-year contract with SPAL in the Italian Serie B.

=== APOEL ===
On 26 June 2023, Fetfatzidis will continue his career in Cyprus on behalf of APOEL, signing a two-year contract. On 3 January 2024, Fetfatzidis was officially released from APOEL

=== Second spell to Aris ===
On 4 January 2024, a day after his release from APOEL, Fetfatzidis signed a 1.5-year contract with Aris.

== International career ==
Fetfatzidis made his debut with Greece in UEFA Euro 2012 qualifying, participating in the 1–0 win over Latvia on 8 October 2010 at the G. Karaiskakis Stadium as an 82nd minute substitution for Sotiris Ninis. In the following game against Israel, he was substituted early for Ninis, who picked up an injury. On 9 February 2011, he scored his first goal for the national team at the AEL FC Arena in Larissa in a friendly match against Canada that Greece won 1–0.

Fetfatzidis scored his second and third goals for his country on 3 June against Malta during a Euro 2012 qualifying game. On 31 March 2015 three Greece players (Fetfatzidis, Moras, Tachtsidis) suffer minor injuries after being involved in fatal car crash following Euro 2016 qualifier 0–0 with Hungary. The crash was on the way to Budapest airport on Monday. Fetfatzidis reportedly received stitches to a head wound.

== Style of play ==
An attacking midfielder, Fetfatzidis is 5'5" with a medium build. He is predominantly left-footed, and is known to play best across midfield or the front-line. Many feel his finishing is the weakest part of his game.

== Career statistics ==
=== Club ===
As of 9 August 2024

Appearances and goals by club, season and competition
Club	Season	League			National cup (Note: Includes Greek Football Cup, Coppa Italia, King Cup, Emir Cup)		League cup (Note: Includes Saudi Crown Prince Cup, Qatari Stars Cup)		Continental		Other		Total	
Club	Season	Division	Apps	Goals	Apps	Goals	Apps	Goals	Apps	Goals	Apps	Goals	Apps	Goals
Olympiacos	2009–10	Super League Greece	3	0	0	0	—		1 (Note: Appearance in UEFA Champions League)	0	—		4	0
Olympiacos	2010–11	Super League Greece	19	2	3	0	—		2 (Note: Appearances in UEFA Europa League)	1	—		24	3
Olympiacos	2011–12	Super League Greece	17	3	3	0	—		2	1	—		22	4
Olympiacos	2012–13	Super League Greece	12	0	8	1	—		2	0	—		22	1
Olympiacos	2013–14	Super League Greece	2	0	—		—		—		—		2	0
Olympiacos	Total		53	5	14	1	—		7	2	—		74	8
Genoa	2013–14	Serie A	31	2	1	0	—		—		—		32	2
Genoa	2014–15	Serie A	5	2	0	0	—		—		—		5	2
Genoa	Total		36	4	1	0	—		—		—		37	4
Chievo (loan)	2014–15	Serie A	4	0	0	0	—		—		—		4	0
Al-Ahli	2015–16	Saudi Pro League	16	3	4	0	2	1	5 (Note: Appearances in AFC Champions League)	0	—		27	4
Al-Ahli	2016–17	Saudi Pro League	25	3	5	2	2	0	8	1	1 (Note: Appearance in Saudi Super Cup)	0	41	6
Al-Ahli	2017–18	Saudi Pro League	26	9	4	2	0	0	2	0	—		32	11
Al-Ahli	Total		67	15	13	4	4	1	15	1	1	0	100	21
Olympiacos	2018–19	Super League Greece	9	1	2	0	—		7	0	—		18	1
Aris	2018–19	Super League Greece	10	1	—		—		—		—		10	1
Aris	2019–20	Super League Greece	32	5	6	0	—		4	0	—		42	5
Aris	2020–21	Super League Greece	3	1	0	0	—		1	0	—		4	1
Aris	Total		45	7	6	0	—		5	0	—		56	7
Al-Khor SC	2020–21	Qatar Stars League	17	3	0	0	6	2	—		0	0	23	5
Al-Khor SC	2021–22	Qatar Stars League	17	6	1	1	3	0	—		1 (Note: Appearance in Qatar Stars League relegation play-off)	1	22	8
Al-Khor SC	Total		34	9	1	1	9	2	—		1	1	45	13
Al-Sailiya SC	2022–23	Qatar Stars League	7	1	0	0	0	0	—		0	0	7	1
SPAL	2022–23	Serie B	13	1	0	0	0	0	—		—		13	1
APOEL	2023–24	Cypriot First Division	6	0	0	0	5	0	—		—		11	0
Aris	2023–24	Super League Greece	18	3	5	0	—		—		—		23	3
Career total			292	45	42	6	18	3	34	3	2	1	388	58

=== International ===
Appearances and goals by national team and year
National team	Year	Apps	Goals
Greece	2010	3	0
Greece	2011	8	3
Greece	2012	2	0
Greece	2013	2	0
Greece	2014	6	0
Greece	2015	4	0
Greece	2016	0	0
Greece	2017	0	0
Greece	2018	0	0
Greece	2019	2	0
Total		27	3

Scores and results list Syria's goal tally first.

#	Date	Venue	Opponent	Score	Result	Competition
1.	9 February 2011	Larissa, Greece	Canada	1–0	1-0	Friendly Match
2.	3 June 2011	Piraeus, Greece	Malta	1–0	3-1	UEFA Euro 2012 Qualifier
3.	3 June 2011	Piraeus, Greece	Malta	3–1	3-1	UEFA Euro 2012 Qualifier

== Honours ==
Olympiacos

- Super League Greece: 2010–11, 2011–12, 2012–13
- Greek Football Cup: 2011–12, 2012–13

Al-Ahli

- Saudi Pro League: 2015–16
- King Cup: 2016
- Saudi Super Cup: 2016

Individual

- Super League Greece Young Player of the Season: 2010–11
- Super League Greece Team of the Season: 2019–20
- Aris Thessaloniki Player of the Season: 2019–20
