= Balázs Megyeri =

Hungarian footballer (born 1990)

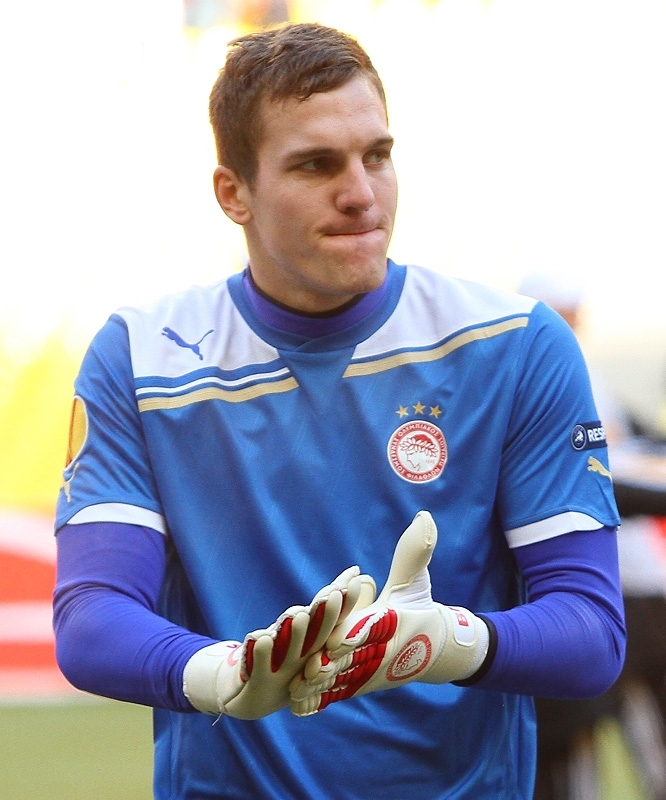
- Megyeri playing for Olympiacos in 2012

Personal information
- Full name: Balázs Attila Megyeri
- Date of birth: 31 March 1990 (age 36)
- Place of birth: Budapest, Hungary
- Height: 1.88 m (6 ft 2 in)
- Position: Goalkeeper

Team information
- Current team: Győri ETO
- Number: 16

Youth career
- 2005–2007: Ferencváros
- 2007–2008: Bristol City

Senior career*
Years	Team	Apps	(Gls)
2008–2010	Ferencváros	26	(0)
2010–2015	Olympiacos	45	(0)
2015–2016	Getafe	0	(0)
2016–2018	Greuther Fürth	41	(0)
2018–2020	Atromitos	45	(0)
2020–2022	Göztepe	2	(0)
2022	AEL Limassol	15	(0)
2022–2025	Debrecen	66	(0)
2025–	Győri ETO	10	(0)

International career
2009–2011	Hungary U21	5	(0)
2016	Hungary	1	(0)
Medal record
Hungary
FIFA U-20 World Cup
Third place	2009 Egypt	U-20 Team
- * Club domestic league appearances and goals as of 30 May 2026

Balázs Attila Megyeri (Hungarian pronunciation: [ˈbɒlaːʒ ˈɒtːilɒ ˈmɛɟɛri], born 31 March 1990) is a Hungarian professional footballer who plays as a goalkeeper for Győri ETO FC.

== Club career ==
=== Ferencváros ===
Born in Budapest, Megyeri began his career with Ferencvárosi TC and played a short time in the youth side for Bristol City, before returning to his previous club in 2008. On 23 August 2009, he began a short trial with Hertha BSC Berlin, but nothing came of it.

Megyeri made his Nemzeti Bajnokság I debut on 26 August, starting in a 0–0 away draw against Szombathelyi Haladás. He appeared in 24 league matches during the campaign, with his side finishing seventh.

=== Olympiacos ===
On 15 June 2010, Megyeri signed a three-year contract with Olympiacos. He took part in the international match "8th Match Against Poverty" on 14 December at the Karaiskakis Stadium, as the club's All Star team goalkeeper.

Megyeri made his debut for the club on 3 April 2011, playing the full 90 minutes in a 3–1 home win against Kavala. He appeared in only three matches during the campaign, being a third-choice behind Antonis Nikopolidis and Urko Pardo.

After Nikopolidis' retirement and Pardo's departure to APOEL, Megyeri was challenged by new signings Franco Costanzo and Iosif Daskalakis. After Constanzo's poor performances, he was elected as first-choice; despite the arrival of Roy Carroll in January 2012, he continued to appear regularly, contributing with 22 matches.

Megyeri battled for the starting spot with Carroll in 2012–13, but was later overtaken by new signing Roberto in the following season.

=== Getafe ===
On 15 July 2015 Megyeri signed a three-year deal with La Liga side Getafe CF, after his contract with Olympiacos expired.

== International career ==
After representing Hungary in the under-21 level, Megyeri was called up to the main squad on 16 May 2012, for a friendly against Czech Republic. However, he was only an unused substitute during the match. Megyeri was named in Hungary's provisional squad for UEFA Euro 2016 but was cut from the final squad.

== Career statistics ==
=== Club ===
As of match played 30 July 2026

Appearances and goals by club, season and competition
Club	Season	League			National Cup		Europe		Total	
Club	Season	Division	Apps	Goals	Apps	Goals	Apps	Goals	Apps	Goals
Ferencváros	2008–09	Nemzeti Bajnokság II	2	0	0	0	—		2	0
Ferencváros	2009–10	Nemzeti Bajnokság I	24	0	0	0	—		24	0
Ferencváros	Total		26	0	0	0	—		26	0
Olympiacos	2010–11	Super League Greece	3	0	0	0	0	0	3	0
Olympiacos	2011–12	Super League Greece	22	0	2	0	6 (Note: Three appearances in the Champions League and three in the Europa League)	0	30	0
Olympiacos	2012–13	Super League Greece	14	0	4	0	3 (Note: Two appearances in the Champions League and one in the Europa League)	0	21	0
Olympiacos	2013–14	Super League Greece	2	0	8	0	0	0	10	0
Olympiacos	2014–15	Super League Greece	4	0	6	0	0	0	10	0
Olympiacos	Total		45	0	20	0	9	0	74	0
Getafe	2015–16	La Liga	0	0	2	0	—		2	0
Greuther Fürth	2016–17	2. Bundesliga	32	0	0	0	—		32	0
Greuther Fürth	2017–18	2. Bundesliga	9	0	0	0	—		9	0
Greuther Fürth	Total		41	0	0	0	—		41	0
Atromitos	2018–19	Super League Greece	26	0	1	0	—		27	0
Atromitos	2019–20	Super League Greece	19	0	3	0	4	0	26	0
Atromitos	Total		45	0	4	0	4	0	53	0
Göztepe	2020–21	Süper Lig	2	0	2	0	—		4	0
Göztepe	2021–22	Süper Lig	0	0	1	0	—		1	0
Göztepe	Total		2	0	3	0	—		5	0
AEL Limassol	2021–22	Cypriot First Division	15	0	4	0	—		19	0
Debrecen	2022–23	Nemzeti Bajnokság I	19	0	2	0	—		21	0
Debrecen	2023–24	Nemzeti Bajnokság I	30	0	1	0	4	0	35	0
Debrecen	2024–25	Nemzeti Bajnokság I	17	0	2	0	—		19	0
Debrecen	Total		66	0	5	0	4	0	75	0
Győri ETO	2025–26	Nemzeti Bajnokság I	10	0	2	0	0	0	12	0
Győri ETO	2026–27	Nemzeti Bajnokság I	0	0	0	0	1	0	1	0
Győri ETO	Total		10	0	2	0	1	0	13	0
Career total			250	0	40	0	18	0	308	0

=== International ===
As of match played 15 November 2016

Appearances and goals by national team and year
National team	Year	Apps	Goals
Hungary	2013	0	0
Hungary	2014	0	0
Hungary	2015	0	0
Hungary	2016	1	0
Hungary	2017	0	0
Total		1	0

== Honours ==
=== Club ===
Ferencváros

- Nemzeti Bajnokság II – East: 2008–09

Olympiacos

- Super League Greece: 2010–11, 2011–12, 2012–13, 2013–14, 2014–15
- Greek Football Cup: 2011–12, 2012–13, 2014–15

Győr

- Nemzeti Bajnokság I: 2025–26

Hungary

- FIFA U-20 World Cup:
  - Third place: 2009

Individual

- Nándor Hidegkuti Prize: 2009–10
