= David Fuster =

Spanish association footballer

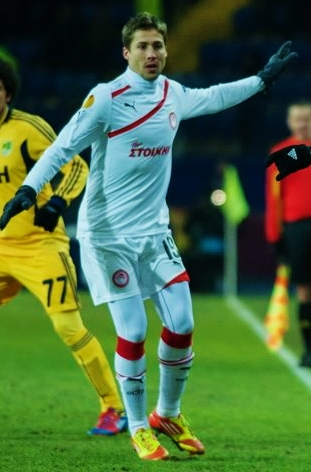
- Fuster in action for Olympiacos in 2012

Personal information
- Full name: David Fuster Torrijos
- Date of birth: 3 February 1982 (age 44)
- Place of birth: Oliva, Spain
- Height: 1.78 m (5 ft 10 in)
- Position: Attacking midfielder

Youth career
- 1992–2002: Oliva

Senior career*
Years	Team	Apps	(Gls)
2002–2004	Oliva	40	(12)
2004–2008	Villarreal B	58	(13)
2008–2009	Elche	36	(13)
2009–2010	Villarreal	22	(3)
2010–2016	Olympiacos	111	(29)
2016–2017	Getafe	19	(0)
Total		286	(58)
- * Club domestic league appearances and goals

David Fuster Torrijos (born 3 February 1982) is a Spanish former professional footballer who played as an attacking midfielder.

After starting out at Villarreal B – he also represented the first team in the 2009–10 season – he went on to spend most of his 15-year career at Olympiacos, appearing in 169 competitive matches and winning nine major titles, including six consecutive Super League Greece championships.

== Club career ==
=== Villarreal and Elche ===
Fuster was born in Oliva, Valencia. Aged 22, he was signed from his hometown club by Villarreal, but spent four years exclusively with its reserves, helping to achieve promotion to Segunda División B in 2007.

In 2008, Fuster was sold to neighbours Elche, with an option to rebuy afterwards. After a solid 2008–09 season in the Segunda División – he was their topscorer at 13, tied for tenth in the league – he was rebought by Villarreal for €500.000. He was relatively played in his debut campaign, scoring his first goal for the club in the 3–2 away defeat against Sevilla on 8 November 2009. On 2 January 2010, he added another in the 1–1 draw at La Liga and UEFA Champions League champions Barcelona.

=== Olympiacos ===
In late August 2010, Fuster signed for Olympiacos in Greece for €1.5 million, rejoining his former Villarreal acquaintances Ariel Ibagaza and Ernesto Valverde (manager). In his first season he won the Super League and reached the quarter-finals of the domestic cup, ranking third in the scoring charts and leading the team in minutes played.

Fuster scored his first goal in the Champions League on 28 September 2011, in a 2–1 away defeat against Arsenal. He also netted in the second game between the two sides (3–1 home win), as the Piraeus side finished third in their group, being relegated to the UEFA Europa League; in the latter competition, his second-half strike was the only of the away win over Rubin Kazan in the round of 32 (eventually 2–0 on aggregate). In the next round he repeated the feat against Metalist Kharkiv, who however won the second leg 2–1 in Athens to progress, with the player featuring the 90 minutes.

On 28 April 2012, in the 119th minute of the final of the Greek Cup, Fuster scored from a Vasilis Torosidis assist for the 2–1 winner against Atromitos after coming on as a late substitute. During the 2012–13 campaign, as Leonardo Jardim was at the helm of the team, he suffered a dip in form, also being injured for two months; when he returned, however, Jardim's replacement Míchel showed confidence in his compatriot.

Fuster scored his third and last goal in the season on 7 April 2013, contributing to a 4–0 away victory over Platanias as Olympiacos won their third national championship in a row. On 15 March of the following year he netted another, with his team downing Panthrakikos 2–0 at home and renewing their domestic supremacy.

After a successful 2014–15, ended with a double, the 33-year-old Fuster extended his contract for a further two years. His renewal was also a satisfaction for his former coach Ernesto Valverde, who mentioned: "Fuster is a perfect player for the club because of the similarities in character. I am also proud for the club because I love it, and I want it to have the best players".

On 2 September 2015, Fuster was left out of newly appointed manager Marco Silva's Champions League squad. He appeared rarely during the season but, on 28 February 2016, helped with a brace to a 3–0 home win against Veria that confirmed the club's 43rd national championship.

On 15 June 2016, Fuster announced on social media that his contract would not be renewed.

=== Getafe ===
Fuster signed a one-year deal with Getafe in July 2016. His only goal of the season came on 17 June 2017 in the promotion play-offs, when he came from the bench to help the hosts to defeat Huesca 3–0 (5–2 on aggregate).

On 25 June 2017, after achieving promotion to the top tier, Fuster announced his retirement aged 35.

== Career statistics ==
Appearances and goals by club, season and competition
Club	Season	League			National cup (Note: Includes Copa del Rey, Greek Football Cup)		Continental		Other		Total	
Club	Season	Division	Apps	Goals	Apps	Goals	Apps	Goals	Apps	Goals	Apps	Goals
Villarreal B	2007–08	Segunda División B	33	10	–		–		–		33	10
Elche	2008–09	Segunda División	36	13	3	1	–		–		39	14
Villarreal	2009–10	La Liga	22	3	2	0	4 (Note: Appearances in UEFA Europa League)	0	–		28	3
Olympiacos	2010–11	Super League Greece	29	13	2	0	–		–		31	13
Olympiacos	2011–12	Super League Greece	20	4	6	2	8 (Note: Four appearances and two goals in UEFA Champions League, four appearances and two goals in UEFA Europa League)	4	–		34	10
Olympiacos	2012–13	Super League Greece	18	3	6	3	6 (Note: Appearances in UEFA Champions League)	0	–		30	6
Olympiacos	2013–14	Super League Greece	21	4	5	2	8	0	–		34	6
Olympiacos	2014–15	Super League Greece	13	2	6	1	5	1	–		24	4
Olympiacos	2015–16	Super League Greece	10	3	6	4	0	0	–		16	7
Olympiacos	Total		111	29	31	12	27	5	0	0	169	46
Getafe	2016–17	Segunda División	19	0	1	0	0	0	3 (Note: Appearances in La Liga play-offs)	1	23	1
Career total			221	55	37	13	31	5	3	1	292	74

== Honours ==
Olympiacos

- Super League Greece: 2010–11, 2011–12, 2012–13, 2013–14, 2014–15, 2015–16
- Greek Football Cup: 2011–12, 2012–13, 2014–15
