= Ilias Spathas =

Greek football referee (born 1980)

- Full name: Ilias Spathas
- Born: 18 February 1980 (age 46); Greece

Domestic
Years	League	Role
2007–2016	Super League Greece	Referee

International
Years	League	Role
2010–2015	FIFA listed	Referee

Ilias Spathas (Greek: Ηλίας Σπάθας; born 18 February 1980) is a former international referee who refereed at 2014 FIFA World Cup qualifiers, beginning with the Group H match between Poland and Moldova.

Spathas became a FIFA referee in 2010.

He is the son of the former referee Giannis Spathas. He belonged to the association of Piraeus.
