= Ariel Ibagaza =

Argentine footballer

Personal information
- Full name: Ariel Miguel Santiago Ibagaza
- Date of birth: 27 October 1976 (age 50)
- Place of birth: Buenos Aires, Argentina
- Height: 1.66 m (5 ft 5 in)
- Position: Attacking midfielder

Senior career*
Years	Team	Apps	(Gls)
1994–1998	Lanús	97	(10)
1998–2003	Mallorca	143	(19)
2003–2006	Atlético Madrid	85	(5)
2006–2008	Mallorca	61	(6)
2008–2010	Villarreal	54	(3)
2010–2014	Olympiacos	72	(1)
2014–2015	Panionios	23	(0)
Total		535	(44)

International career
1995	Argentina U20	6	(1)
2004	Argentina	1	(0)

Managerial career
- 2016–2017: Olympiacos (assistant)
- 2017: Olympiacos (assistant)
- 2017–2018: Olympiacos U20 (assistant)
- 2018: Olympiacos (assistant)
- 2021–2022: Olympiacos B
- 2023–2024: Olympiacos B
- * Club domestic league appearances and goals

Ariel Miguel Santiago Ibagaza (born 27 October 1976) is an Argentine professional football manager and former player. Nicknamed El Caño, his usual position was attacking midfielder, and he was well known for his technique and vision.

He spent the vast majority of his professional career in Spain – where he represented mainly Mallorca – and amassing La Liga totals of 343 matches and 33 goals over 12 seasons.

== Playing career ==
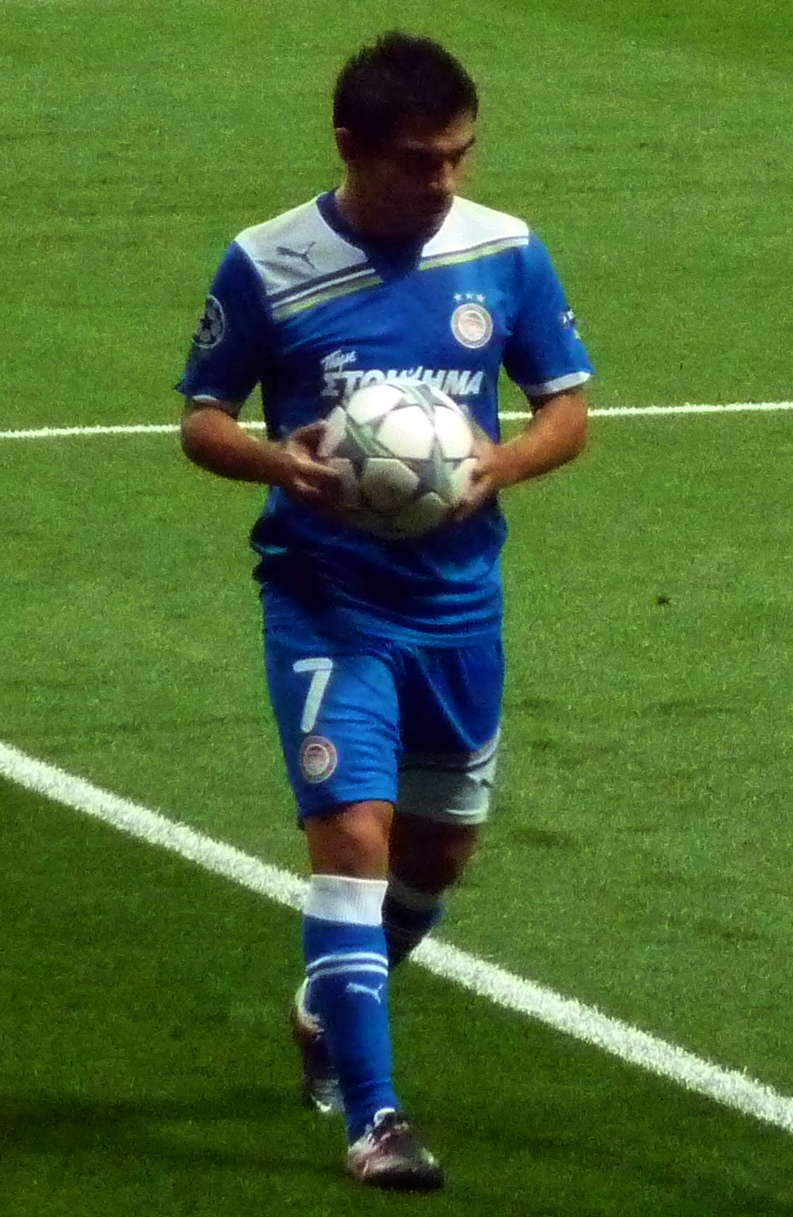
Ibagaza in action for Olympiacos in 2011

Born in Buenos Aires, Ibagaza began his professional career with Club Atlético Lanús, and moved in July 1998 to RCD Mallorca in Spain alongside teammate Gustavo Siviero (another Argentine, Carlos Roa, had done the same move the previous season), being part of the Balearic Islands side that finished third in his first year, narrowly missing on UEFA Champions League group stage entry.

In the 2000–01 campaign Ibagaza, best known for his playmaking decisions, scored a career-best ten goals, and continued to be an undisputed starter – and team captain – for Mallorca until his departure for Atlético Madrid, in July 2003. He renewed his contract in March 2006, but found himself surplus to requirements at the start of 2006–07, and arranged a move back to Mallorca, being among the top assisters in the second season after the return.

Ibagaza signed a €1.5 million deal with Villarreal CF in early July 2008, for two seasons. Two years later, after two irregular seasons, marred by some physical problems (even though he still managed to appear in more than 60 official games with the Valencian team), the 34-year-old moved to Olympiacos in Greece, agreeing to a two-year deal.

Ibagaza scored his first official goal for the Piraeus club in a 1–0 away win against Asteras Tripolis, and went on to contribute with 24 matches (no goals) as his team won the national championship. He left in June 2014 after 97 competitive appearances and a further three domestic leagues and, on 20 August of that year, signed for one year with fellow league side Panionios.

== Managerial career ==
Ibagaza managed Olympiacos B for season 2021–22 in Super League Greece 2.

== Honours ==
Lanús

- Copa CONMEBOL: 1996

Mallorca

- Supercopa de España: 1998
- Copa del Rey: 2002–03

Olympiacos

- Super League Greece: 2010–11, 2011–12, 2012–13, 2013–14
- Greek Football Cup: 2011–12, 2012–13

Argentina U20

- FIFA U-20 World Cup: 1995

Individual

- Super League Greece Player of the Season: 2010–11
- Olympiacos Golden Eleven
